= Mission Delta 2 =

U.S. Space Force space domain awareness delta

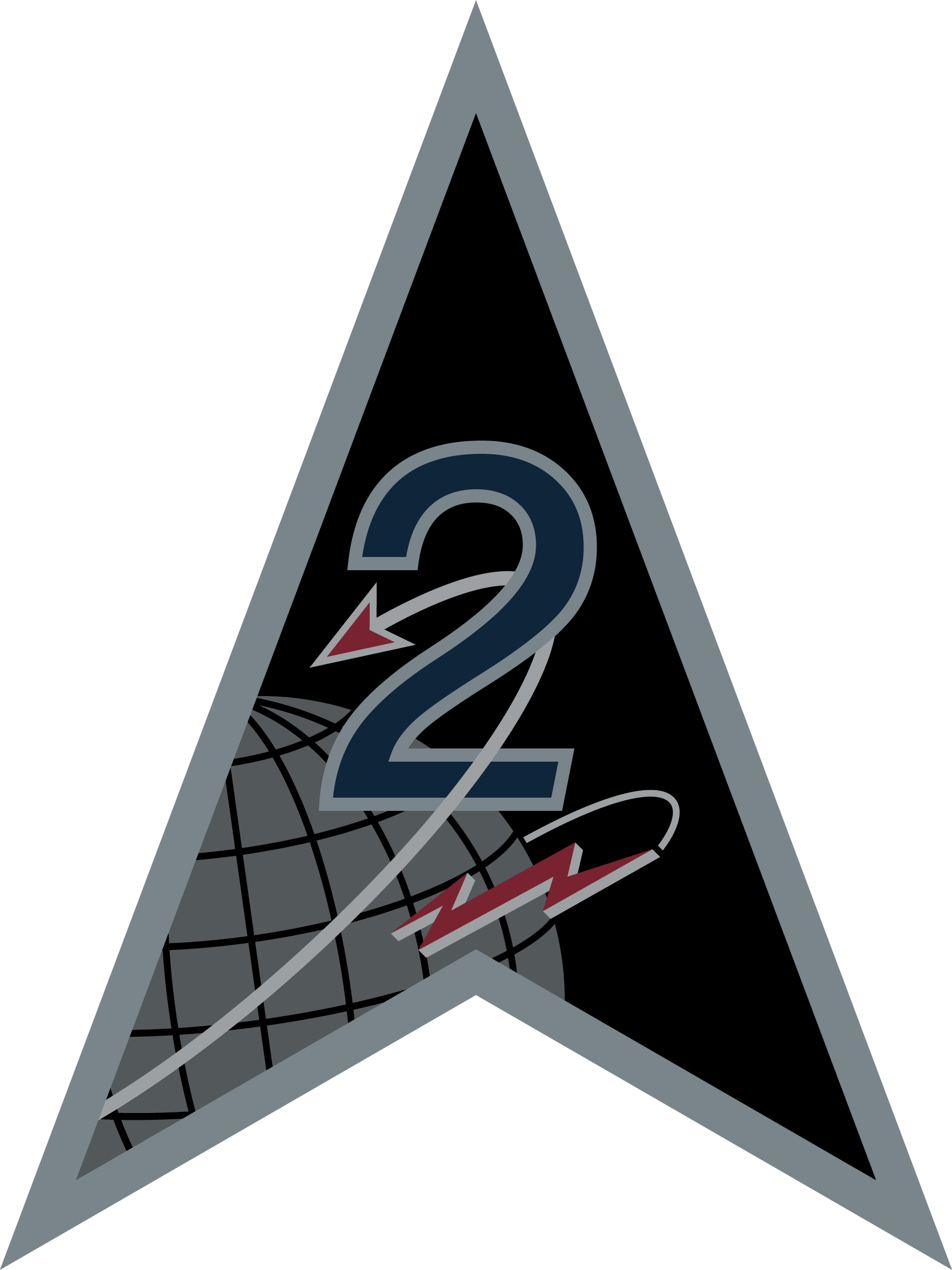
- Mission Delta 2 emblem
- Founded: 1 February 1942; 84 years ago as 21st Bombardment Group 24 July 2020; 6 years ago as Space Delta 2
- Country: United States
- Branch: United States Space Force
- Type: Delta
- Role: Space domain awareness
- Size: 380 personnel
- Part of: United States Space Force Combat Forces Command
- Headquarters: Peterson Space Force Base, Colorado, U.S.
- Nickname: Sentinels
- Engagements: Antisubmarine, American Theater Air Offensive, Japan Global war on terrorism

- Decorations: Distinguished Unit Citation Air Force Outstanding Unit Award
- Website: www.peterson.spaceforce.mil/Units/Space-Delta-2/

Commanders
- Commander: Col Barry A. Croker
- Deputy Commander: Lt Col Scott D. Munn
- Senior Enlisted Leader: CMSgt Leomel I. Abueg

Insignia
- Guidon

Mission Delta 2 (MD2) is the United States Space Force's space domain awareness delta, headquartered at Peterson Space Force Base, Colorado. Mission Delta 2 tracks and monitors all human made objects from low Earth orbit to geosynchronous orbit and further out to deep space. It also partners with the National Oceanic and Atmospheric Administration to provide weather satellite observation for the U.S. Armed Forces. It consists of the 15th Space Surveillance Squadron, 18th Space Defense Squadron, 19th Space Defense Squadron, and 20th Space Surveillance Squadron.

Mission Delta 2 was originally established on 1 February 1942 as the 21st Bombardment Group (21 BG), flying the B-25 Mitchell and B-26 Marauder in antisubmarine patrols during World War II. After the 21 BG inactivated in 1943, the 21st Fighter Group (21 FG) was activated in 1943 in Hawaii, flying the P-39 Airacobra, P-38 Lightning, and P-51 Mustang during the Battle of Iwo Jima and escorting bombers during air raids on Japan until the 21 FS was inactivated in 1946. The 21st was reactivated again in 1952 as the 21st Fighter-Bomber Group (21 FBG) under the 21st Fighter-Bomber Wing and flying the F-86 Sabre, deploying to support NATO forces in France during the Cold War before inactivating in 1958. Although the group would be redesignated the 21st Tactical Fighter Group (21 TFG) in 1985, it would not be reactivated until 1991 as the 21st Operations Group (21 OG), when it briefly was reactivated under the 21st Wing, providing air defense for Alaska flying the F-15C and F-15E, before inactivating later that year. The 21st Operations Group was reactivated under Air Force Space Command's 21st Space Wing in 1992 and provided missile warning, space surveillance, and space control forces. On 24 July 2020, it was redesignated as Space Delta 2 and transferred from the Air Force to the Space Force on 21 October 2020. On 31 October 2024 it was redesignated Mission Delta 2 and gained sustainment responsibilities, along with organic cyber defense and intelligence forces.

== History ==
=== Anti-submarine patrols in the American Theater ===
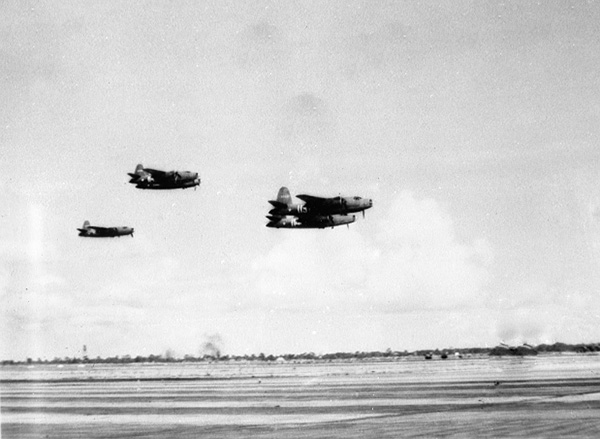
B-26 Maruder medium bombers of the 21st Bombardment Group at MacDill Field.

21st Bombardment Group (Medium) squadrons
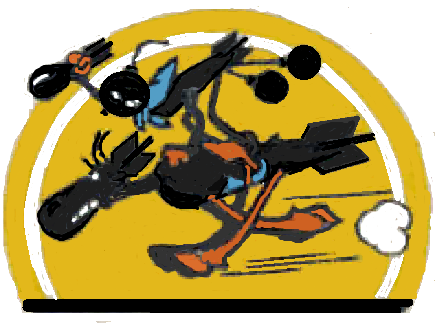
313th Bombardment Squadron

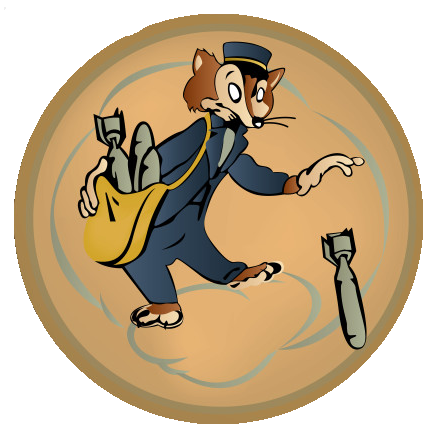
314th Bombardment Squadron

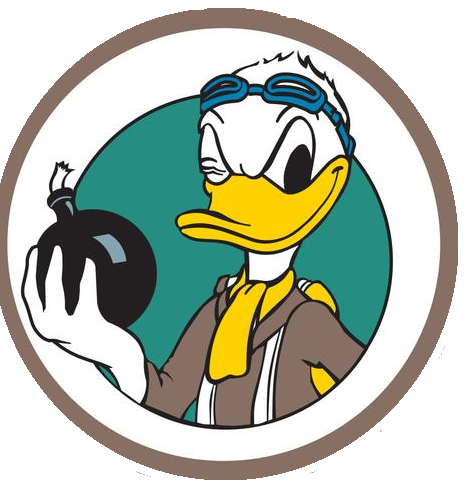
398th Bombardment Squadron

On 1 February 1942, the 21st Bombardment Group (Medium) was activated at Bowman Field, Kentucky under the United States Army Air Forces' Air Force Combat Command, flying the North American B-25 Mitchell medium bomber. It consisted of the 8th Reconnaissance Squadron (later redesignated the 398th Bombardment Squadron), 313th Bombardment Squadron, 314th Bombardment Squadron, and 315th Bombardment Squadron. On 6 February 1942, the 21st Bombardment Group moved to Jackson Army Air Base, Mississippi, serving as an operational training group. On 11 March 1942, it was realigned under the 3rd Air Force's III Bomber Command and on 21 April 1942 moved to Columbia Army Air Base. On 2 May 1942, it was briefly reassigned from III Bomber Command to XII Bomber Command, before being regained by III Bomber Command on 8 May 1942 and moved to Key Field, Mississippi on 24 May 1942. On 24 June 1942, the 21st Bombardment Group moved to MacDill Field, Florida and converted to Martin B-26 Marauder medium bombers. While stationed at MacDill Field, the group conducted anti-submarine patrols in the Caribbean Sea, participating in the American Theater of World War II. On 10 October 1943, the 21st Bombardment Group was inactivated.

=== Bomber escort and fighter operations in the Pacific Theater ===
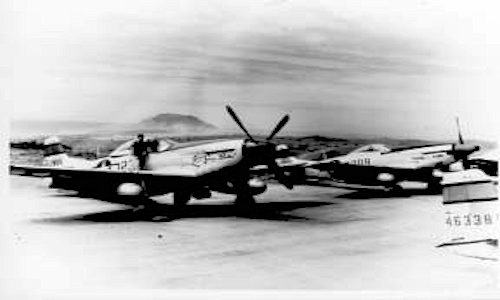
21st Fighter Group P-51 Mustangs on Iwo Jima.

21st Fighter Group squadrons
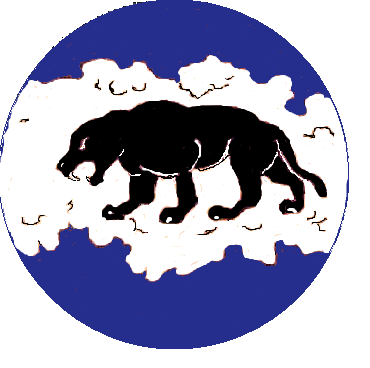
46th Fighter Squadron

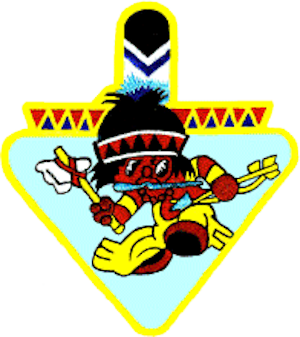
72nd Fighter Squadron

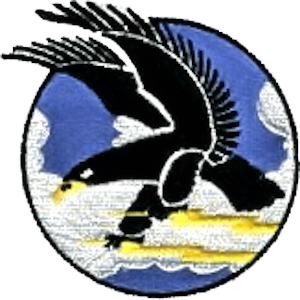
531st Fighter Squadron

On 31 March 1944, the 21st Fighter Group, Two Engine, was activated on 21 April at Wheeler Field, Hawaii and assigned to the US Army Air Forces, Central Pacific Area before being realigned under Seventh Air Force's VII Fighter Command on 24 April 1944. The 21st Fighter Group consisted of the 46th Fighter Squadron, 72nd Fighter Squadron, and 531st Fighter Squadron and flew the Bell P-39Q Airacobra. Tasked with providing air defense over the Hawaiian Islands, the 21st Fighter Wing was realigned under the 7th Fighter Wing on 3 July 1944 and began upgrading to the Lockheed P-38J/L Lightning in September 1944. In October 1944, the 21st Fighter Group switched aircraft again, flying the North American P-51 Mustang and transferring to Mokuleia Field, Hawaii on 13 October 1944. On 10 November 1944, the 21st Fighter Group was realigned under the VII Fighter Command, but remained attached to the 7th Fighter Wing until 28 February 1945.

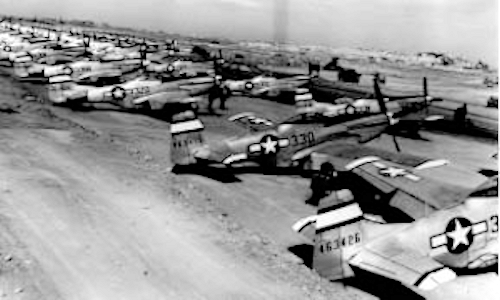
21st Fighter Group P-51 Mustangs on Iwo Jima.

In February 1945, the 21st Fighter Group was directly resubordinated under the VII Fighter Command and transported by ships to Iwo Jima, arriving at Central Field on 25 March 1945. On the Morning of 26 February 1945, the elements of the 21st Fighter Group was attacked by Imperial Japanese Army soldiers on the ground. Fighting alongside a contingent of U.S. Marines, the airmen killed 250 Japanese soldiers in tent-to-tent fighting, with fourteen 21st Fighter Group airmen killed and 50, including the group commander, Colonel Kenneth R. Powell, were wounded. Following the engagement on the ground, the 21st Fighter Group provided close air support for the remainder of the Battle of Iwo Jima.

Following the island's capture, the 21st Fighter Group began conducting long-range bomber escort missions, with the first occurring on 7 April 1945, where P-51 Mustangs from the group escorted B-29 Superfortress heavy bombers striking the Nakajima Aircraft Company in Tokyo. This mission was the first time bombers over Japan were accompanied by escort fighters and was the longest over-water fighter escort mission to that point during World War II. On 16 July 1945, the group transferred to Iwo Jima's South Field and flew its last combat mission over Japan on 14 August 1945. For its raid over Nakajima Aircraft Company, the 21st Fighter Group was awarded the Distinguished Unit Citation. After the end of World War II, the 21st Fighter Group transferred to Isely Field, Saipan on 4 December 1945 and then to Northwest Field, Guam on 17 April 1946. The 21st Fighter Group was inactivated on 10 October 1946.

=== NATO deployment to France ===
21st Fighter-Bomber Group squadrons
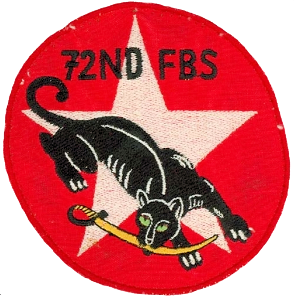
72nd Fighter-Bomber Squadron

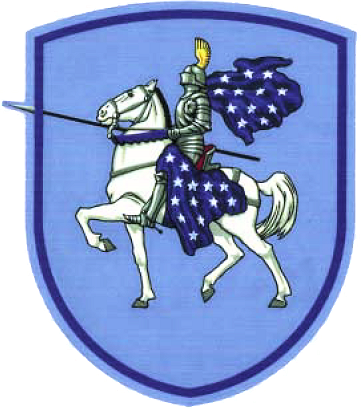
416th Fighter-Bomber Squadron

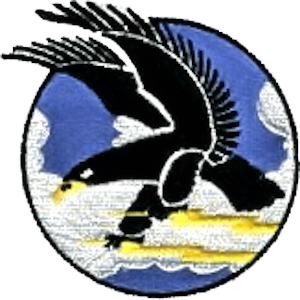
531st Fighter-Bomber Squadron

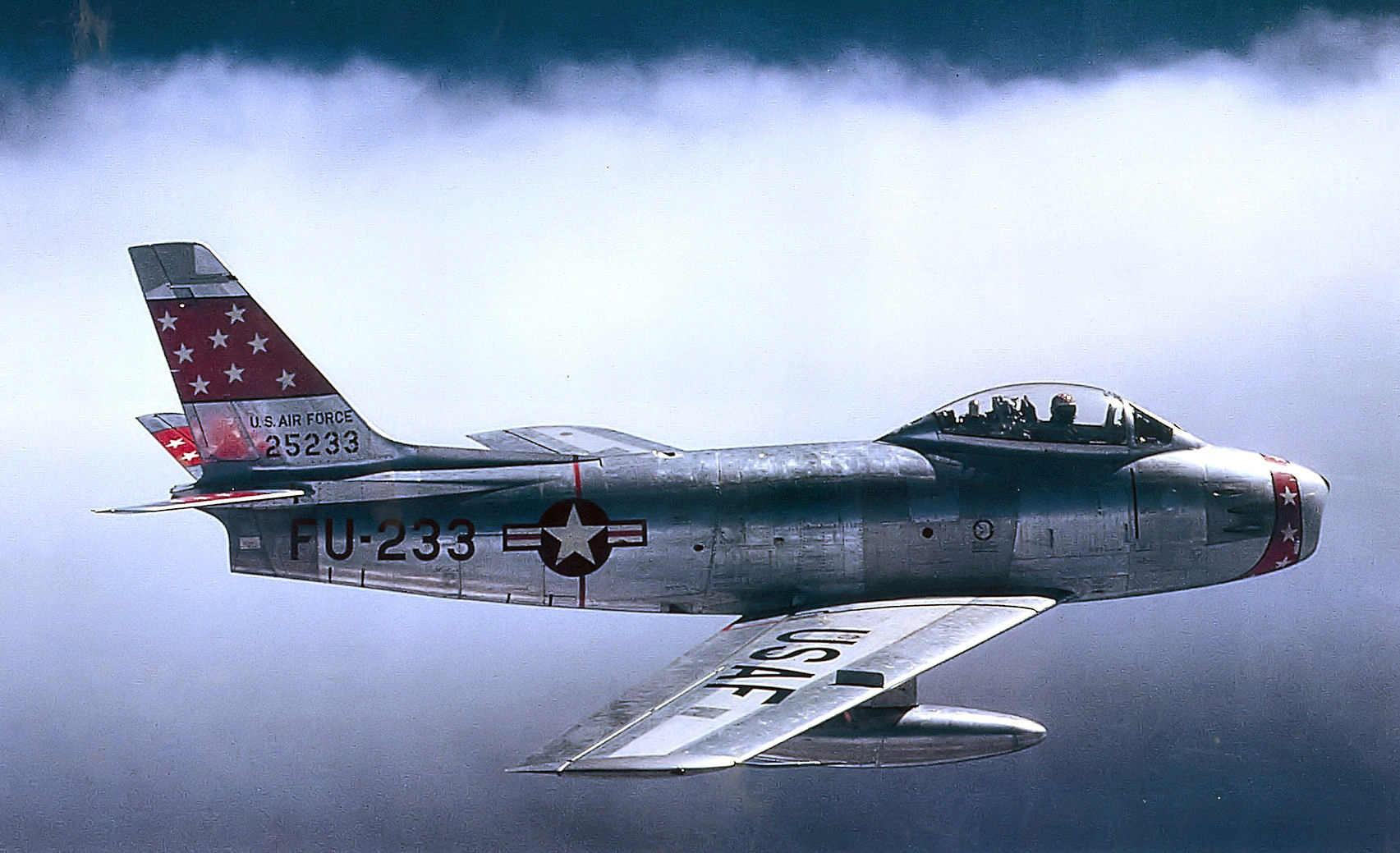
F-86F Sabre of the 72nd Fighter-Bomber Squadron

On 1 January 1953, the 21st was reactivated as the 21st Fighter-Bomber Group at George Air Force Base, California under the 21st Fighter-Bomber Wing. Following the end of World War II, the wing replaced the group as the primary unit of organization within the Air Force. Initially organized under Tactical Air Command's Ninth Air Force, the 21st Fighter-Bomber Group consisted of its World War II 72nd Fighter-Bomber Squadron and 531st Fighter-Bomber Squadron, adding the 416th Fighter-Bomber Squadron. Initially flying the F-51 Mustang fighter, within six months of activation, the 21st Fighter-Bomber Group had transitioned to the North American F-86F Sabre, a first-generation jet fighter. In September and October 1953, the 21st Fighter-Bomber Group participated in a special arctic warfare program at Eielson Air Force Base, Alaska. Following the completion of this exercise, it sent six F-86s to participate in Project Willtour, which consisted of an 11,000 mile tour of twelve Central, Caribbean, and South American countries. In April and May 1954, it participated in Operation Boxkite at North Field, South Carolina, testing the ability for a tactical wing to deploy to a forward location and sustain thirty days of combat operations.

Following the completion of these exercises, on 22 June 1954, the Secretary of the Air Force announced that the 21st Fighter-Bomber Wing, including the 21st Fighter-Bomber Group, would be deployed to Chambley Air Base, France, under Twelfth Air Force and the North Atlantic Treaty Organization to defend against the Warsaw Pact and Soviet Union. While the 21st Fighter-Bomber Wing's personnel moved in four tranches across air, land, and sea transport, the 21st Fighter-Bomber Group's F-86s flew directly, stopping in Labrador, Greenland, Iceland, and Scotland. The 21st Fighter-Bomber Group officially was stationed at Chambley Air Base on 12 December 1954, however the airfield could not handle the jet fighters until it was upgraded by Air Force engineers in June 1956. The flying elements of the group operated in the interim out of a variety of airfields in the French countryside.

One of the most notable pilots in the 21st Fighter-Bomber Group was then-First Lieutenant Michael Collins, who would later become a NASA astronaut, flying the Gemini 10 and Apollo 11 missions, before retiring from the Air Force as a major general.

The 21st Fighter-Bomber Group conducted close air support training with United States Army Europe land forces and took first place at the United States Air Forces in Europe's gunnery meet at Wheelus Field, Libya. In 1955, the 21st Fighter-Bomber Group participated NATO's Carte Blanche atomic warfare exercise and took second place at Nellis Air Force Base's gunnery exercise in 1956. The unit also won the United States Air Forces in Europe award for tactical proficiency in 1957. On 8 February 1958, the 21st Fighter-Bomber Group and 21st Fighter-Bomber Wing were inactivated.

=== Alaskan air defense operations ===
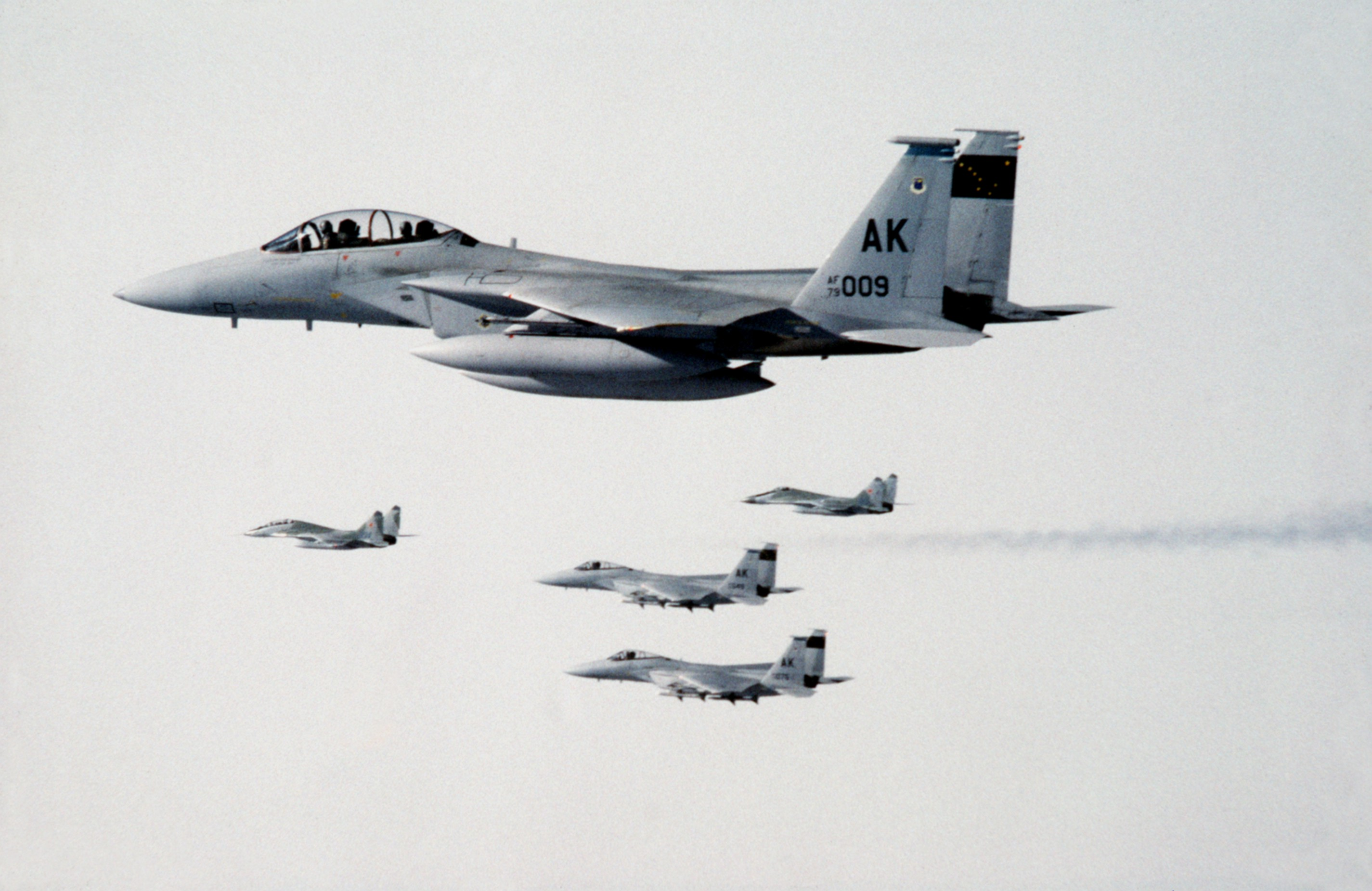
43rd Tactical Fighter Squadron F-15s escort Soviet Air Forces MiG-29s on their visit to America.

21st Operations Group squadrons
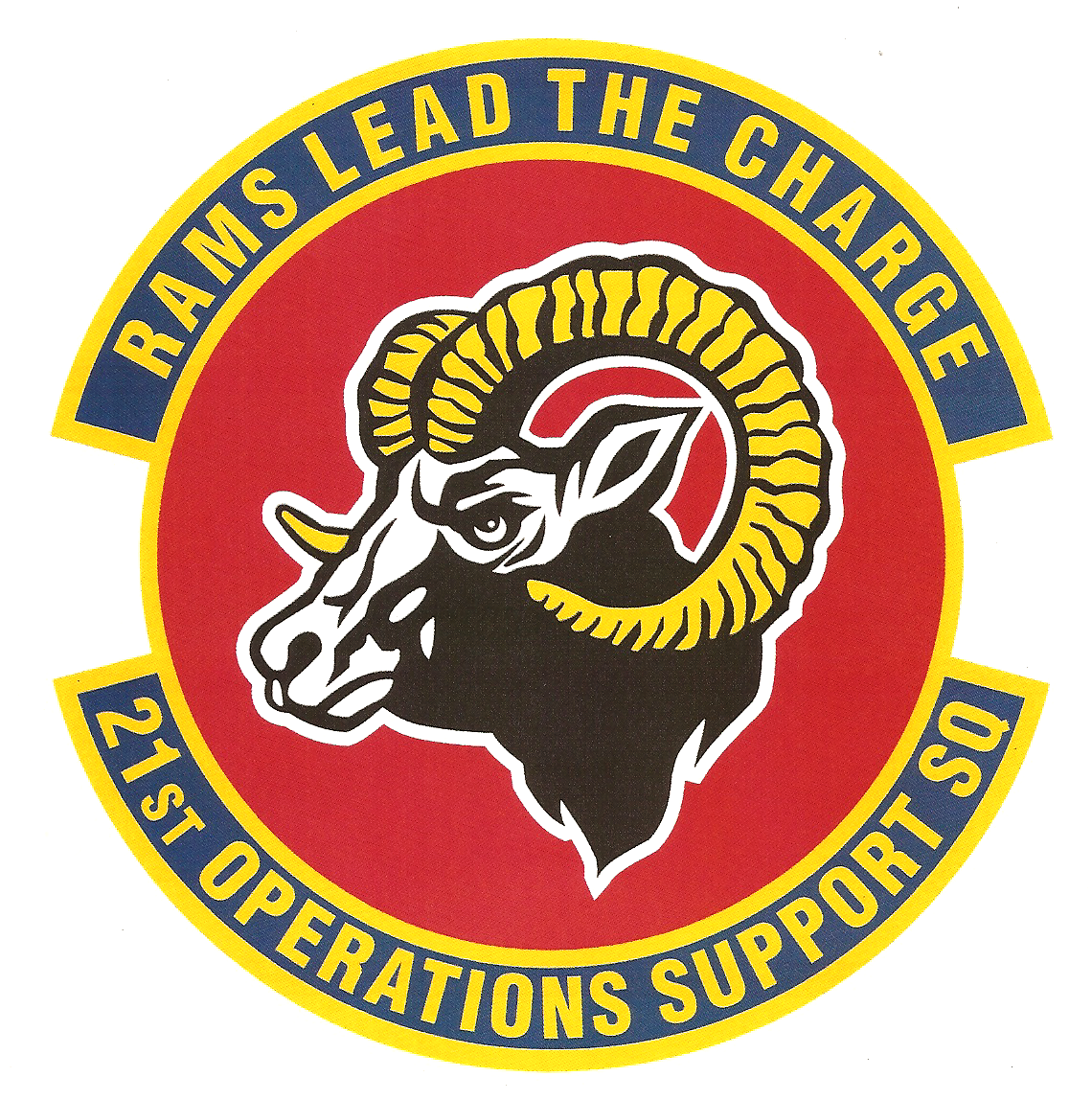
21st Operations Support Squadron

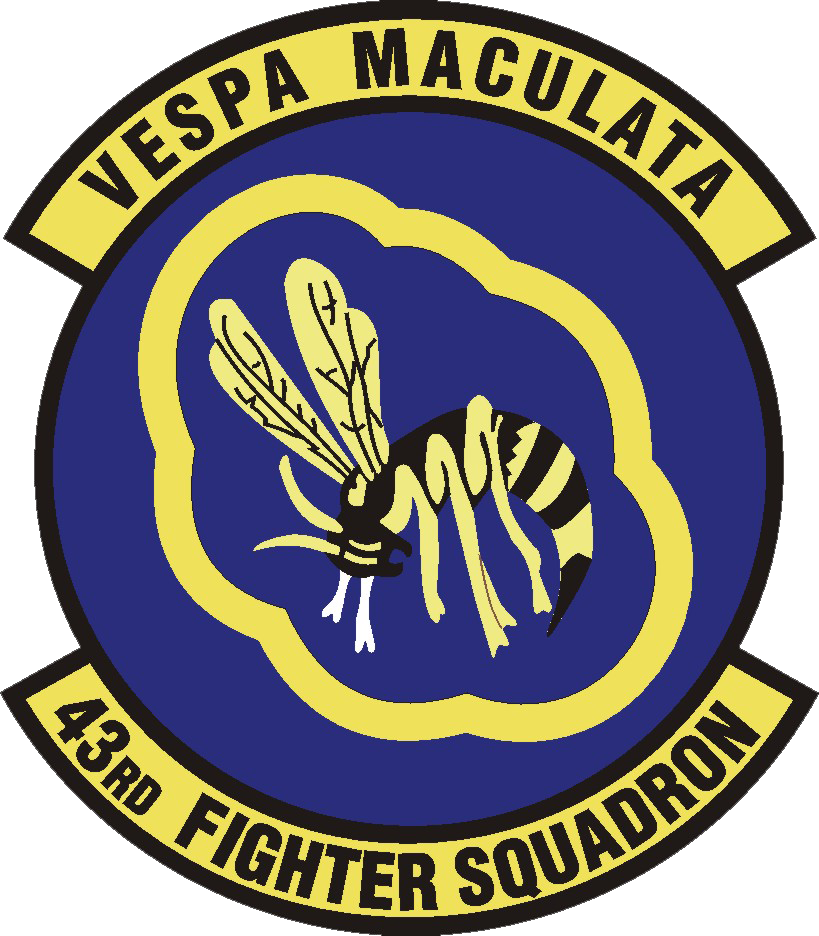
43rd Fighter Squadron

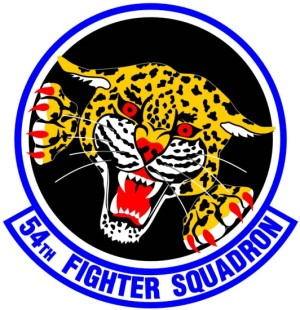
54th Fighter Squadron

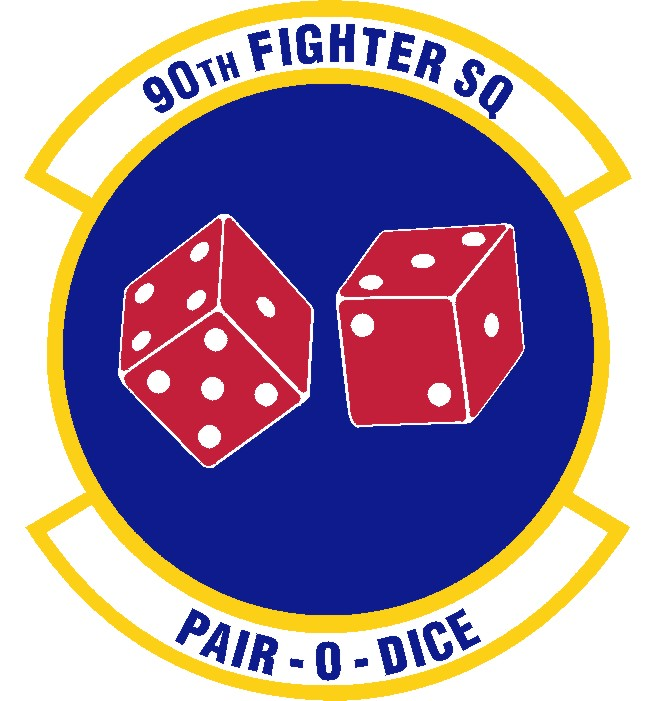
90th Fighter Squadron

While the 21st Wing would continue, Air Force policy on operations groups resulted in the 21st Fighter-Bomber Group remaining inactive for the following decades. In 1985, it was redesignated as the 21st Tactical Fighter Group, but not activated until 25 September 1991 as the 21st Operations Group under the 21st Wing at Elmendorf Air Force Base, Alaska. It briefly consisted of the 21st Operations Support Squadron, 43rd Fighter Squadron, 54th Fighter Squadron, and 90th Fighter Squadron under Alaskan Air Command and supporting North American Aerospace Defense Command. The 43rd Fighter Squadron and 54th Fighter Squadron flew the McDonnell Douglas F-15C Eagle, while the 90th Fighter Squadron flew the McDonnell Douglas F-15E Strike Eagle. Following the 21st Operations Group's activation, the Air Force implemented a program that directed that each base would have one wing and one commander. The 21st Wing and 3rd Wing shared Elmendorf Air Force Base, resulting in the 21st Wing, and 21st Operations Group's inactivation on 19 December 1991.

=== From space surveillance to space control ===
21st Operations Group space warning squadrons
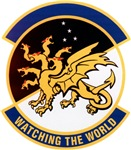
3rd Command and Control Squadron

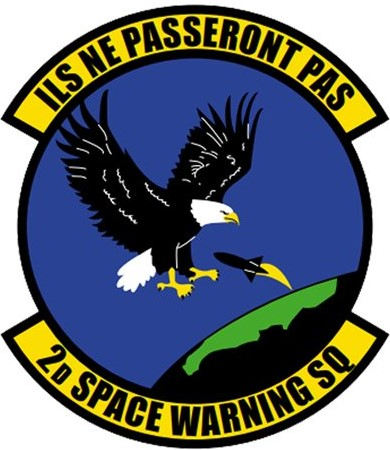
2nd Space Warning Squadron

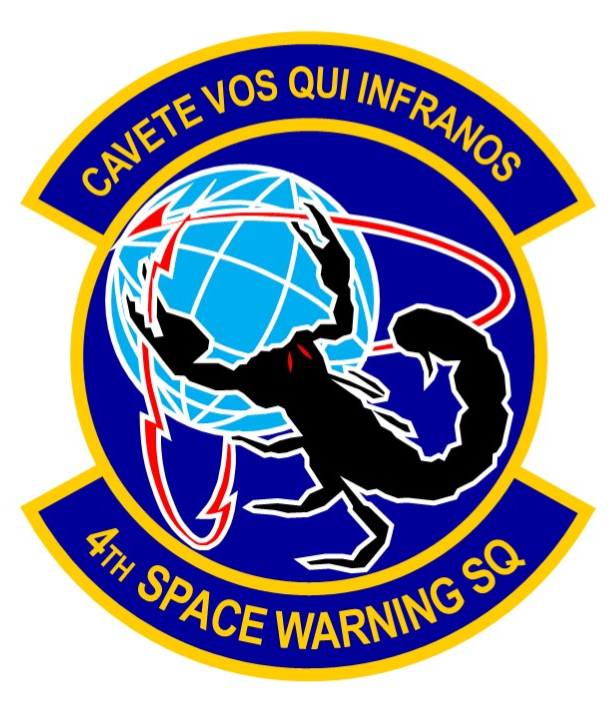
4th Space Warning Squadron

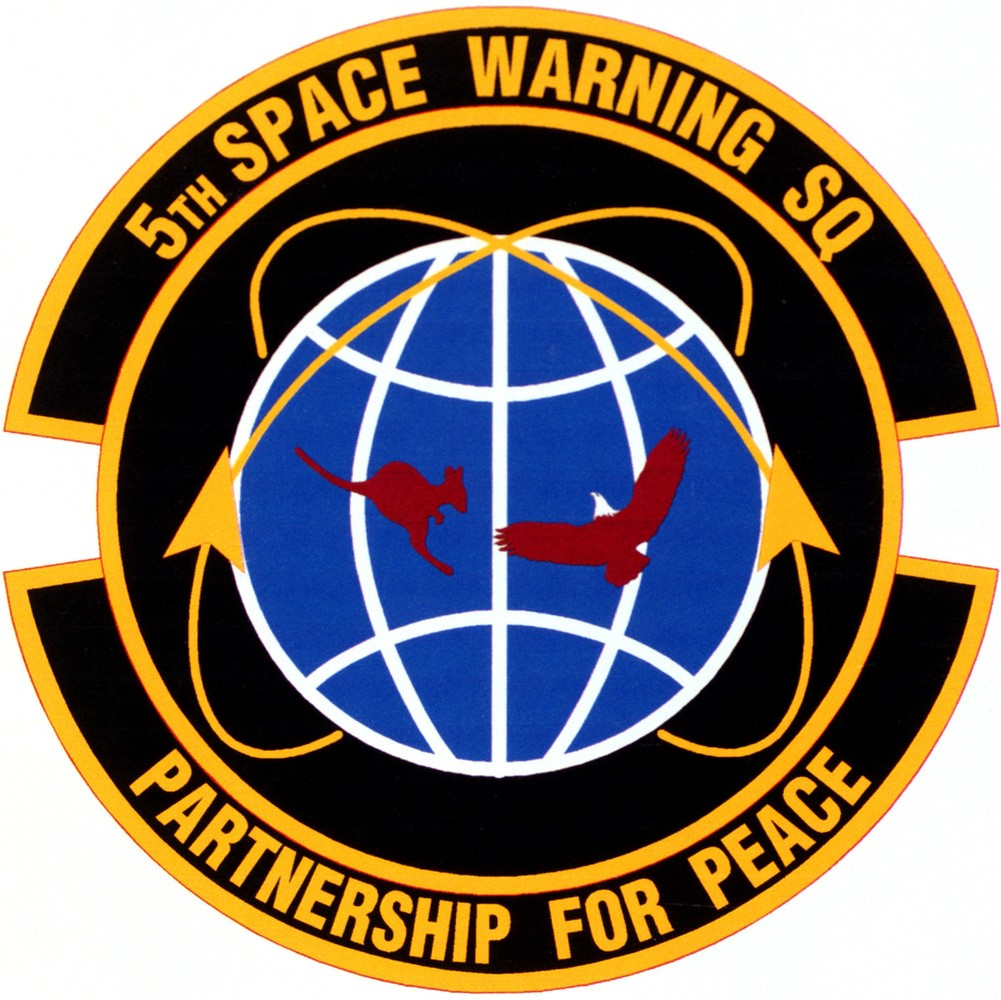
5th Space Warning Squadron

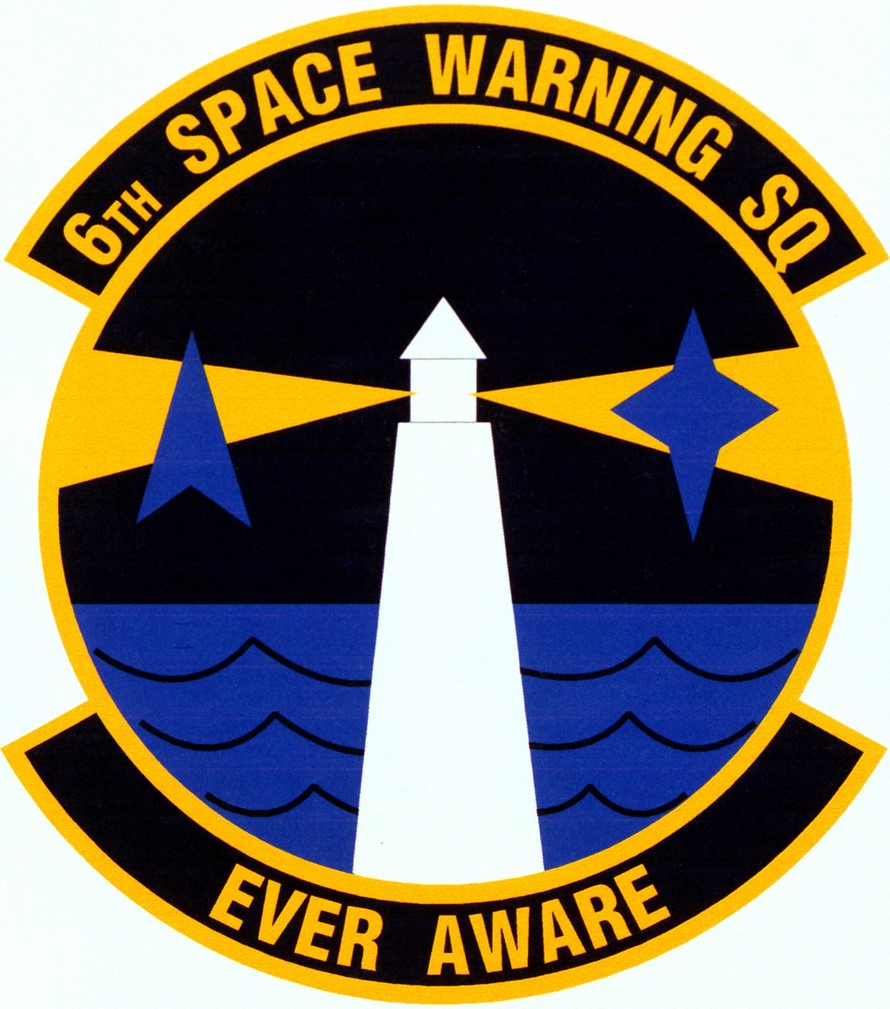
6th Space Warning Squadron

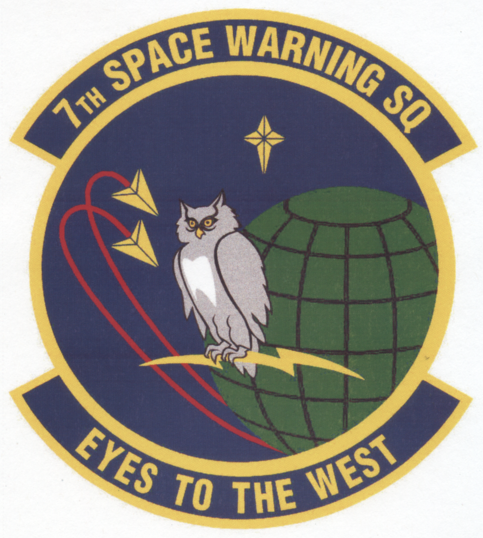
7th Space Warning Squadron

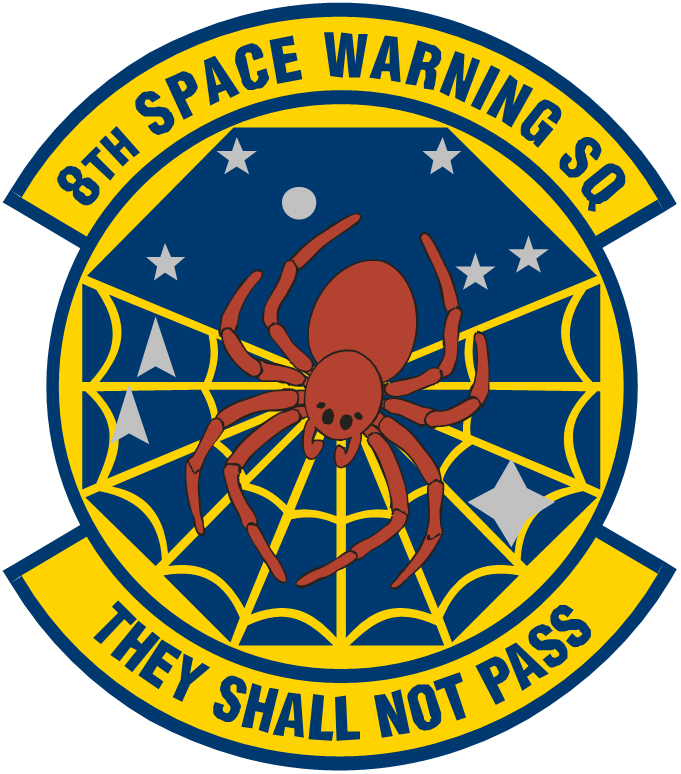
8th Space Warning Squadron

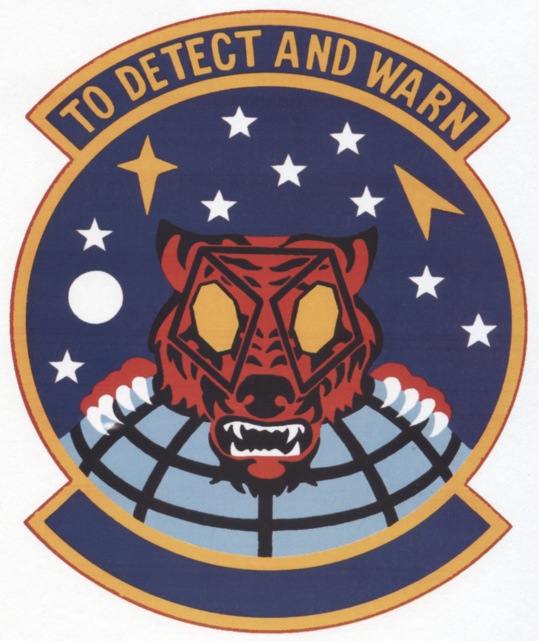
9th Space Warning Squadron

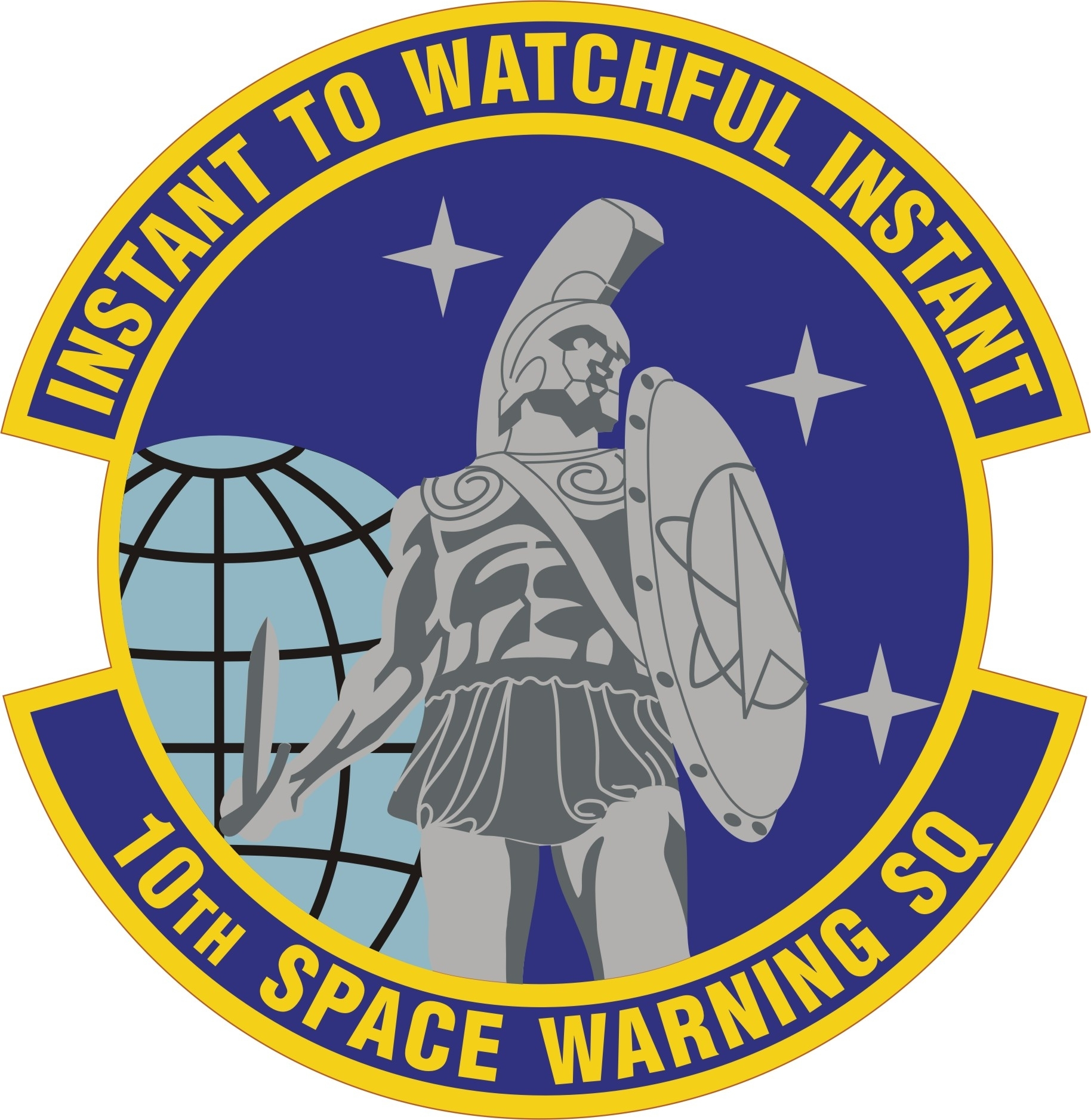
10th Space Warning Squadron

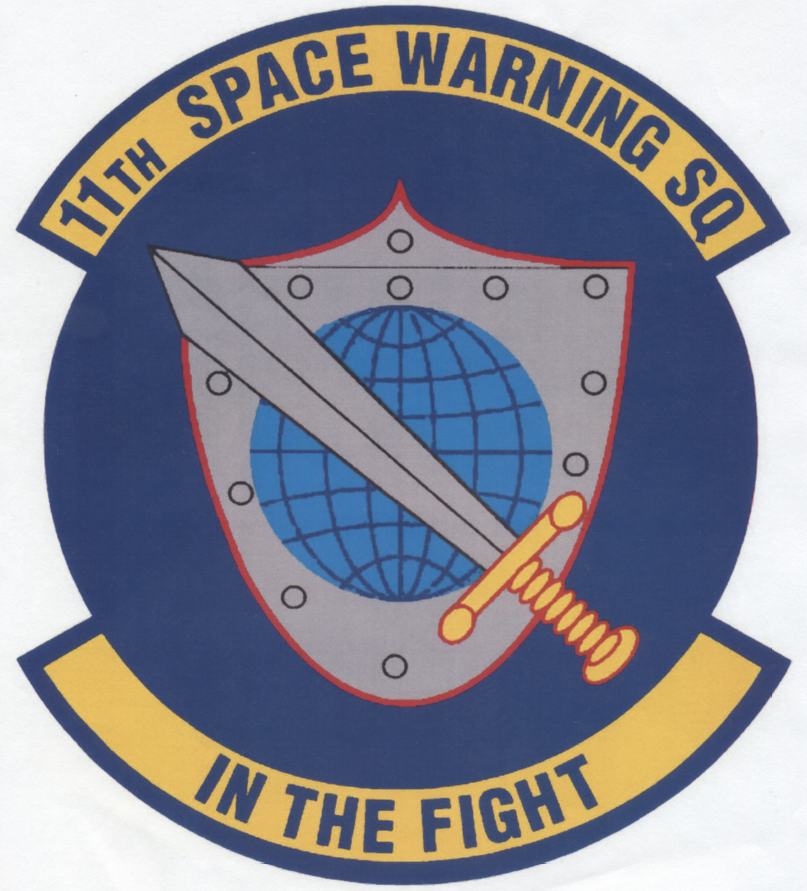
11th Space Warning Squadron

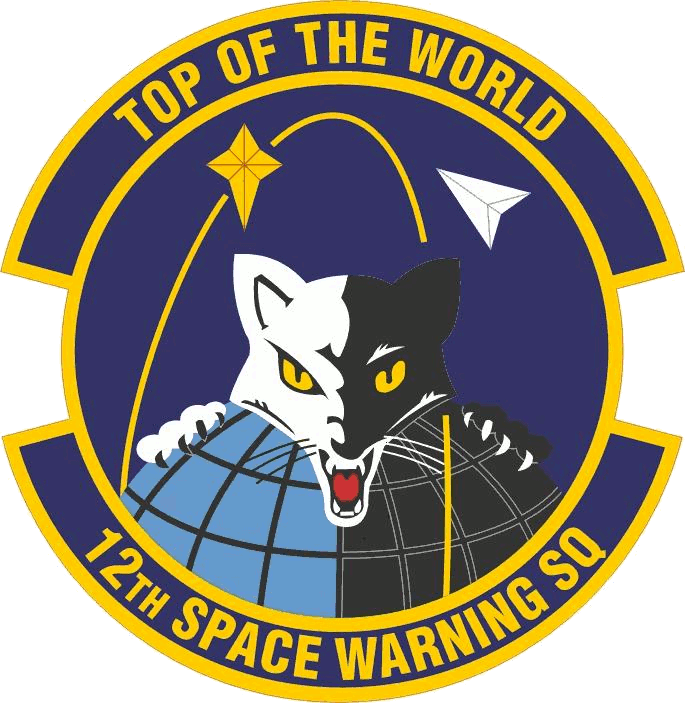
12th Space Warning Squadron

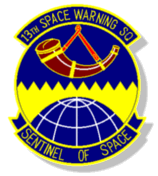
13th Space Warning Squadron

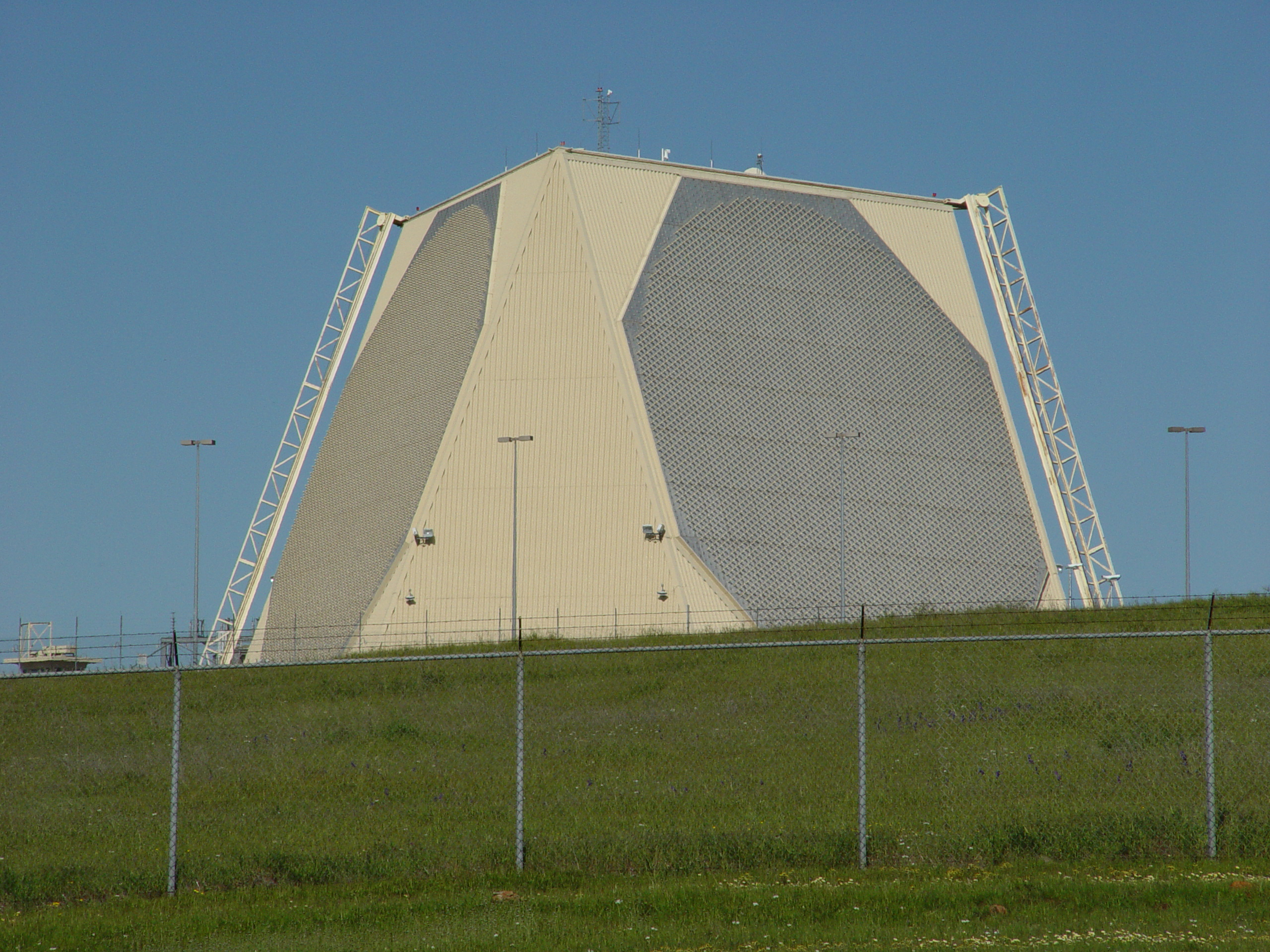
PAVE PAWS radar at Beale Air Force Base.

On 15 May 1992, the 21st Operations Group was reactivated alongside the 21st Space Wing at Peterson Air Force Base under Air Force Space Command, with the 21st Operations Group specifically absorbing the responsibilities of the former 1st Space Wing. The 21st Operations Group's primary mission was missile warning. It operated the Defense Support Program missile warning constellation, which was flown by the 2nd Space Warning Squadron at Buckley Air National Guard Base and the 5th Space Warning Squadron at Woomera Air Station, Australia, while the 4th Space Warning Squadron operated the Mobile Ground Station from Holloman Air Force Base, before transferring the mission to the Air National Guard's 137th Space Warning Squadron in 1997. The 11th Space Warning Squadron was activated in 1994 at Falcon Air Force Base to operate the Attack and Launch Early Reporting to Theater (ALERT) missile warning system.

The 21st Operations Group also inherited three Ballistic Missile Early Warning System (BMEWS) radars, operated by the 13th Space Warning Squadron at Clear Air Force Station, Alaska, 12th Space Warning Squadron at Thule Air Base, Greenland, and a Royal Air Force operated radar at RAF Fylingdales. As the BMEWS radars had been in operation since the 1960s, the sites were in the process of being upgraded to the Solid State Phased Array Radar System (SSPAR), with Thule Air Base's being upgraded in 1987, RAF Fylingdales' in 1992, and Clear Air Force Station's in 2001. The 21st Operations Group also inherited the PAVE PAWS radars operated by the 6th Space Warning Squadron at Cape Cod Air Force Station, 7th Space Warning Squadron at Beale Air Force Base, 8th Space Warning Squadron at Eldorado Air Force Station, and 9th Space Warning Squadron at Robins Air Force Base. The last ground-based missile warning radar operated by the 21st Operations Group was the AN/FPQ-16 PARCS at Cavalier Air Force Station and operated by the 10th Space Warning Squadron. Following the end of the Cold War and the implementation of budget cuts, the radars and squadrons as Eldorado Air Force Station and Robins Air Force Base were inactivated.

21st Operations Group space surveillance squadrons
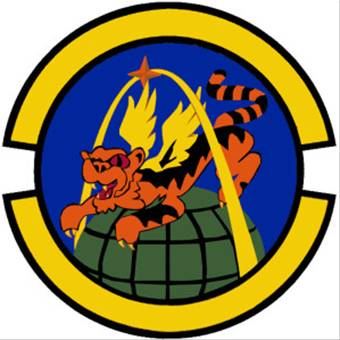
1st Command and Control Squadron

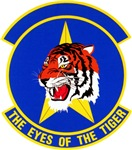
2nd Command and Control Squadron

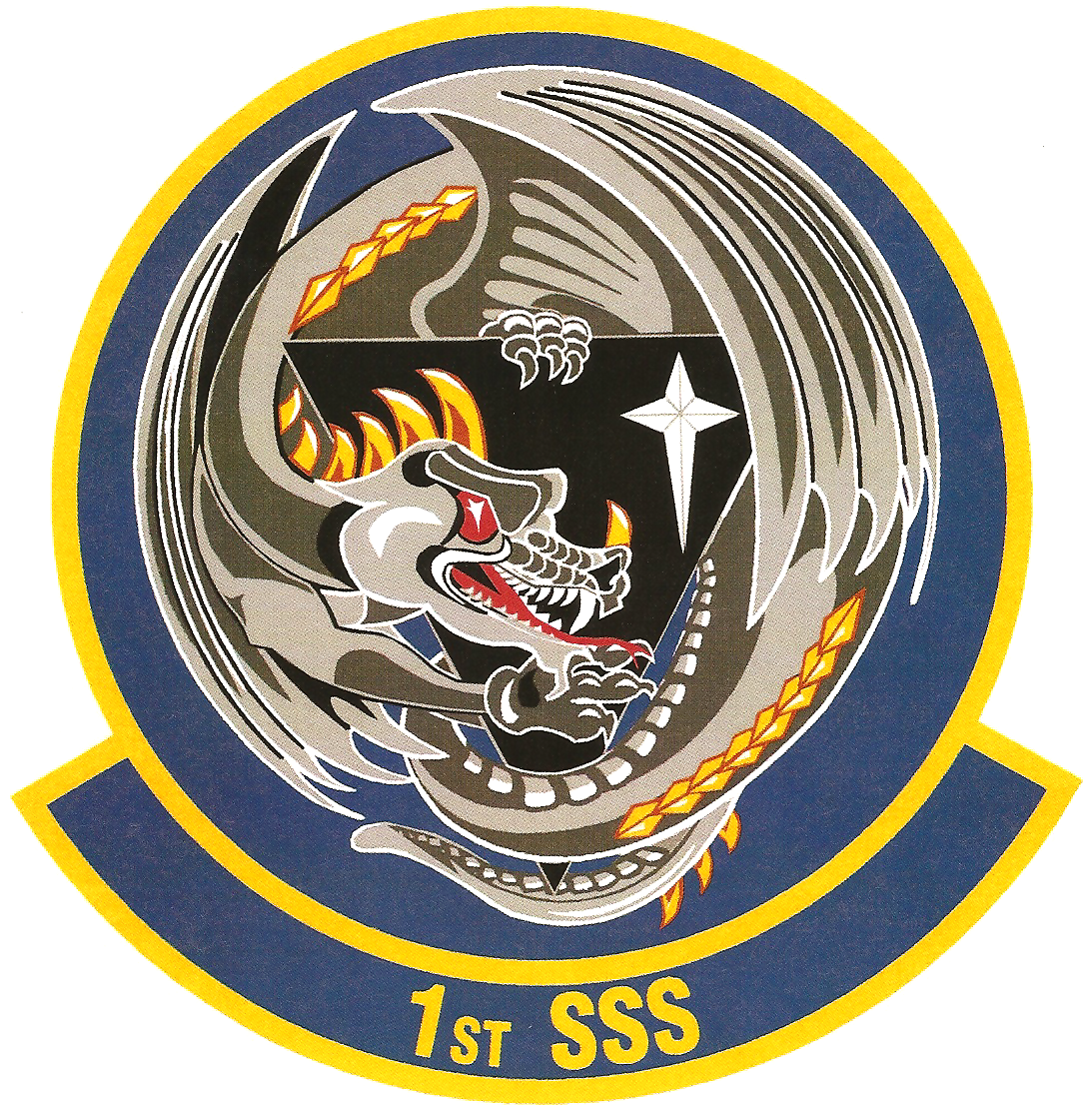
1st Space Surveillance Squadron

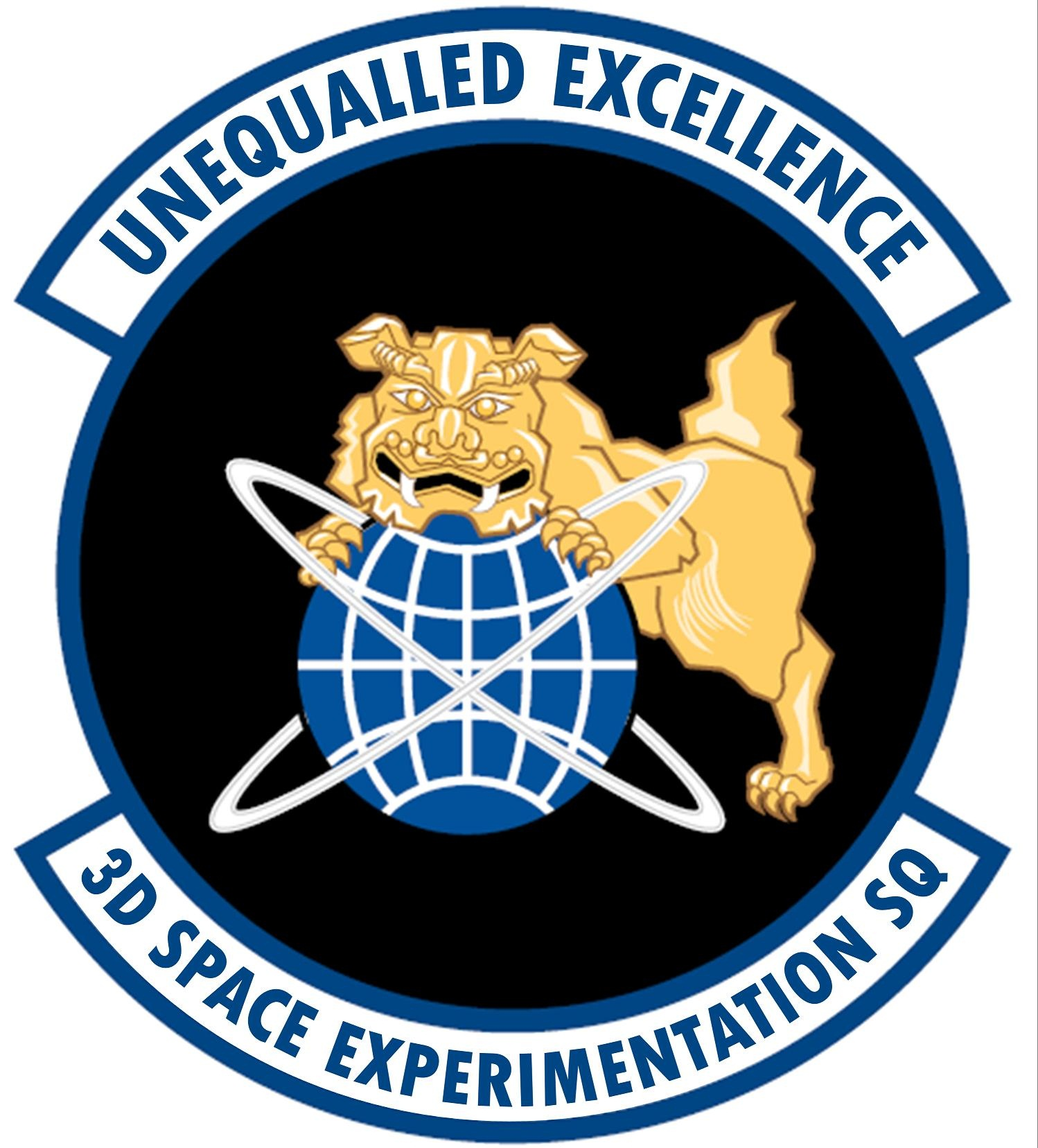
3rd Space Surveillance Squadron

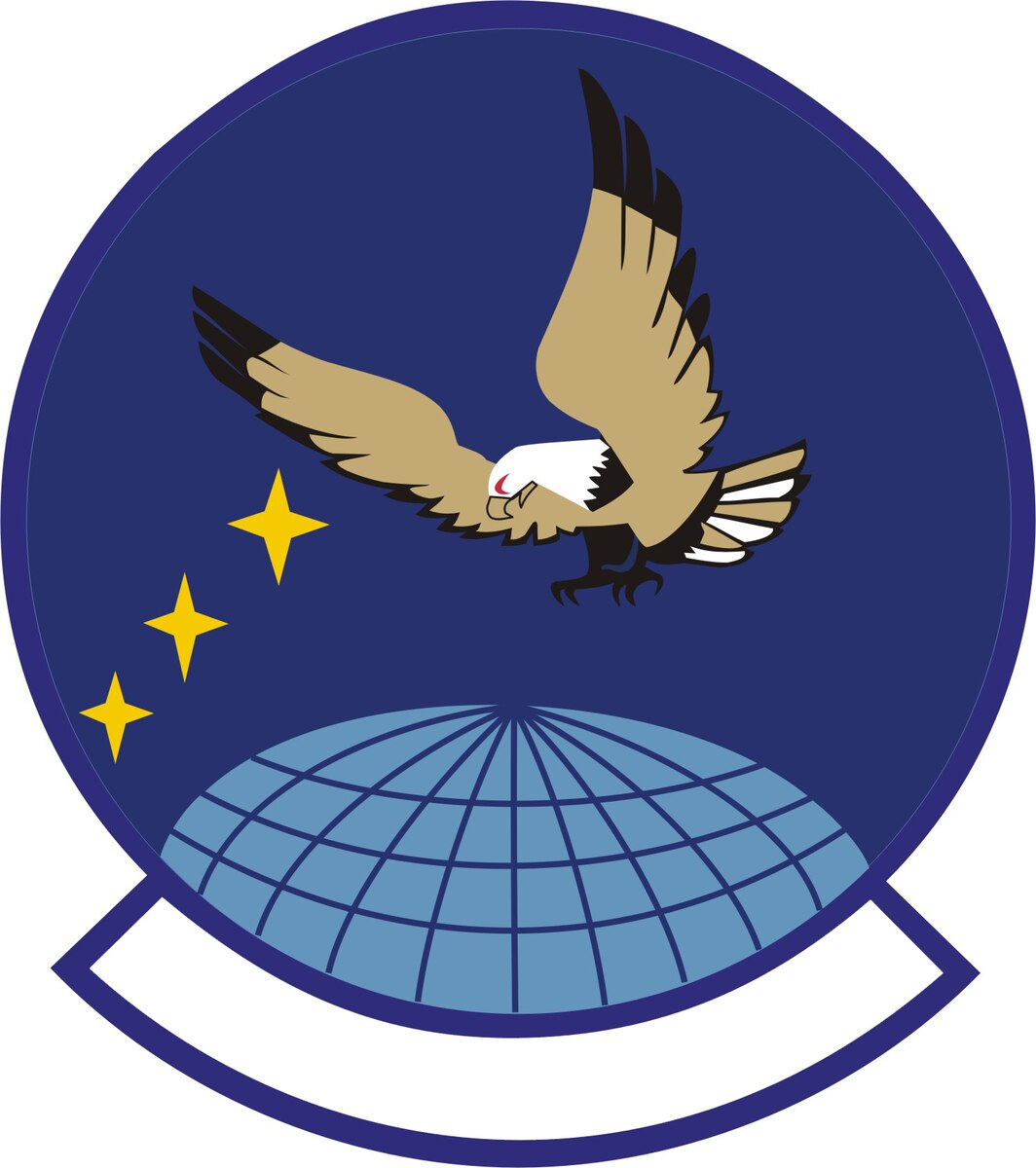
4th Space Surveillance Squadron

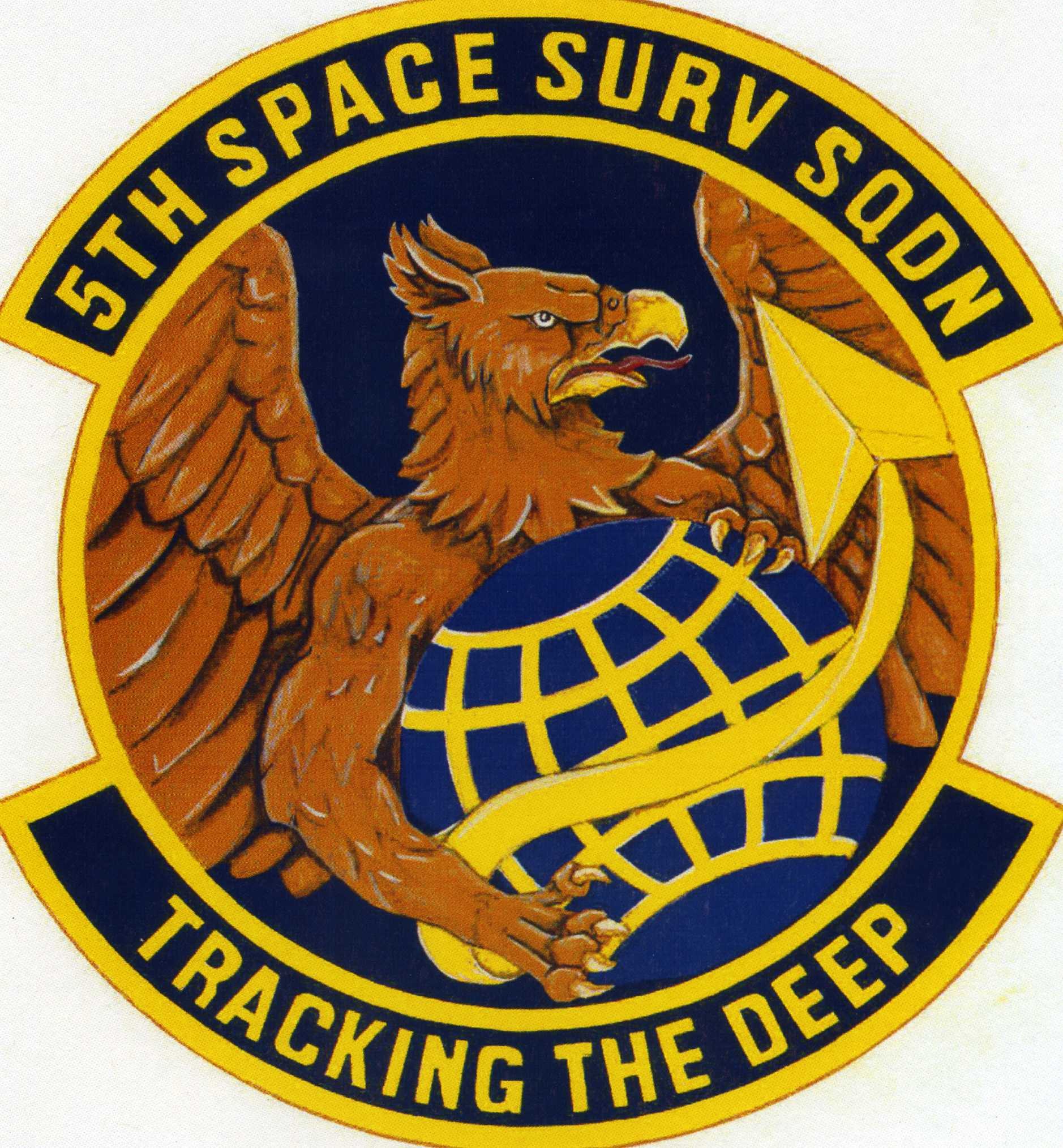
5th Space Surveillance Squadron

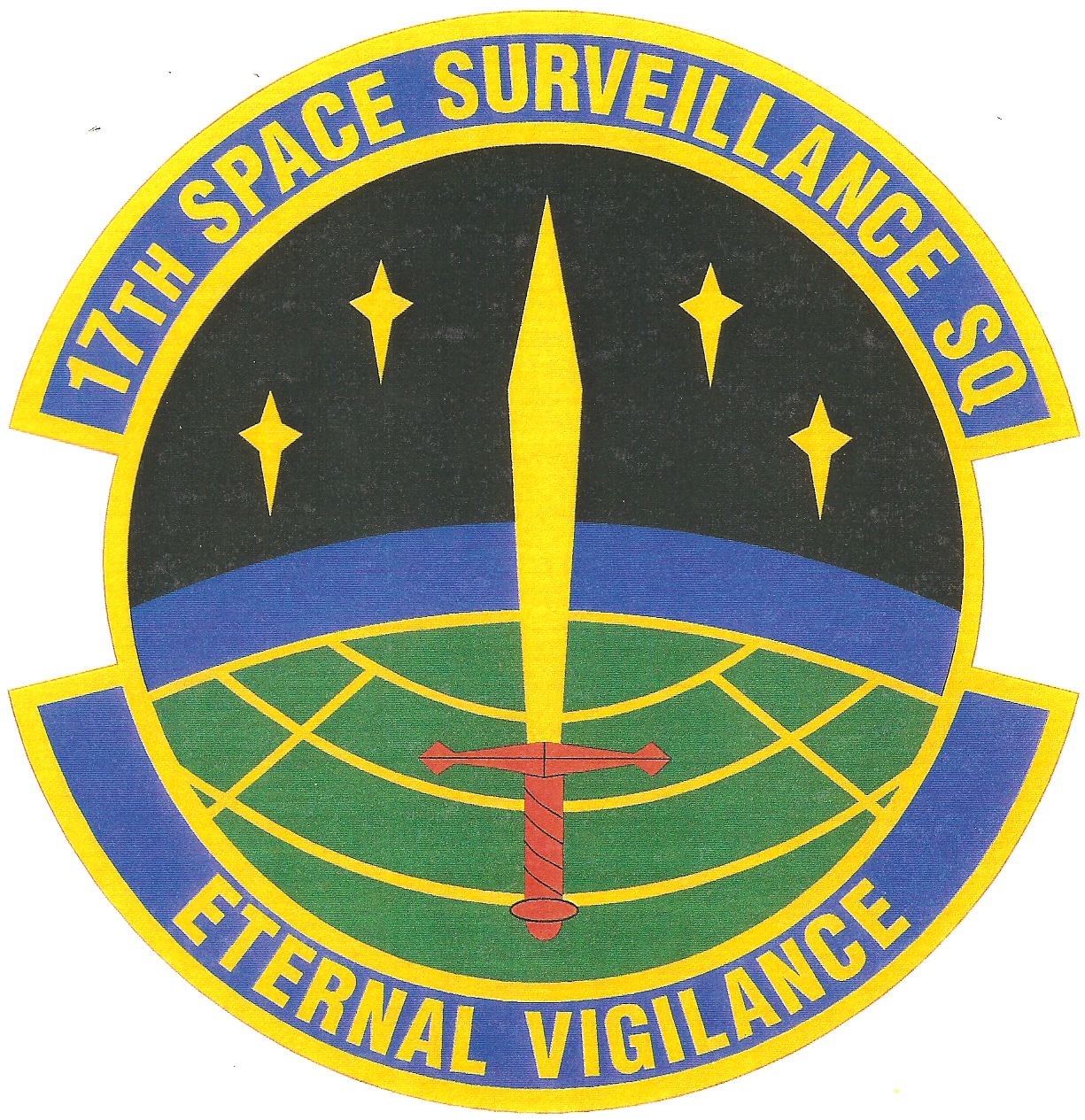
17th Space Surveillance Squadron

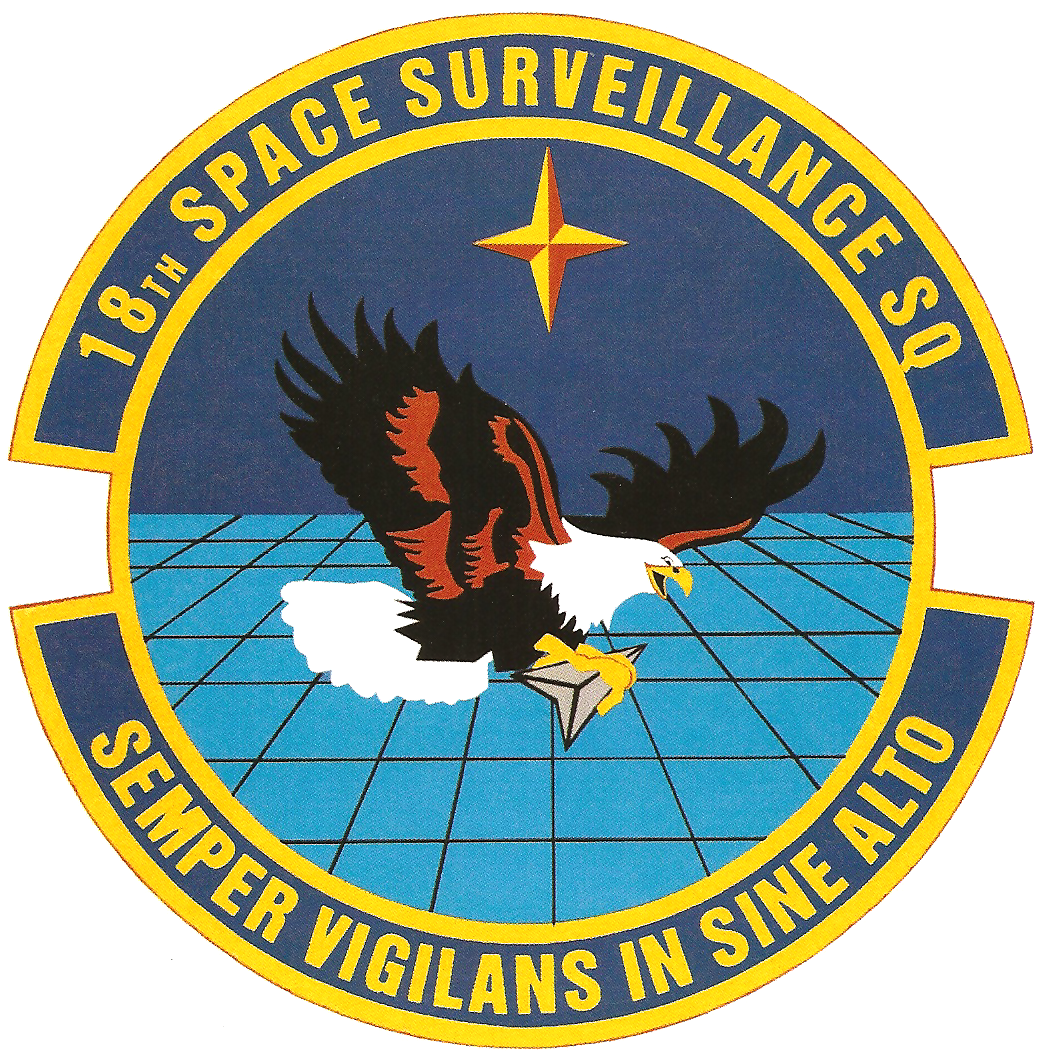
18th Space Surveillance Squadron

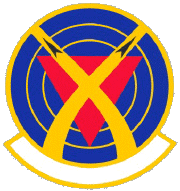
19th Space Surveillance Squadron

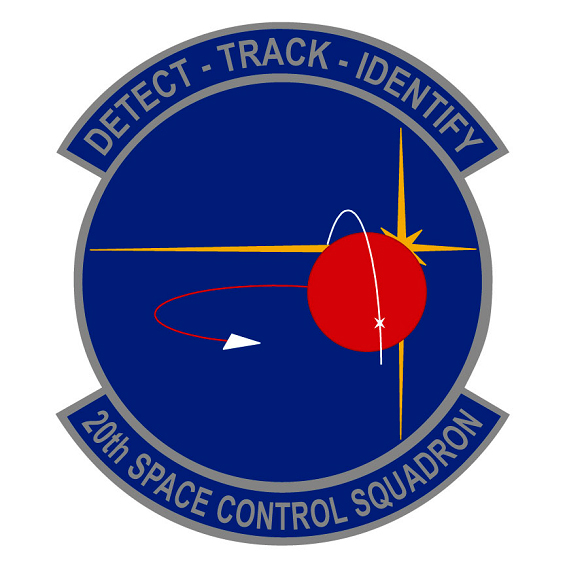
20th Space Surveillance Squadron

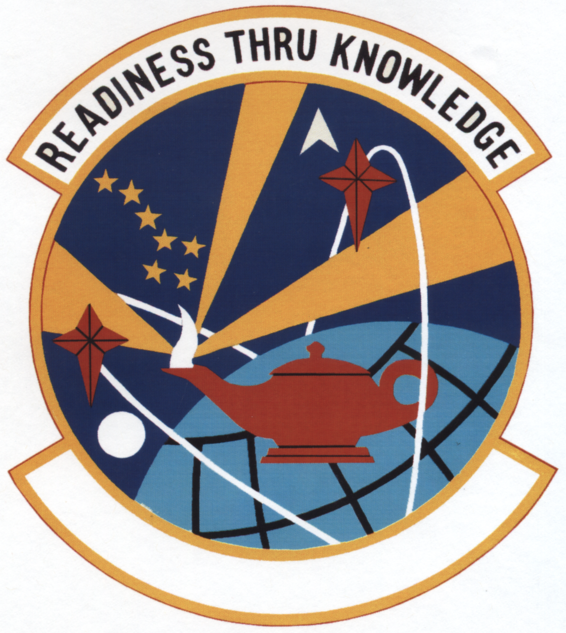
21st Crew Training Squadron

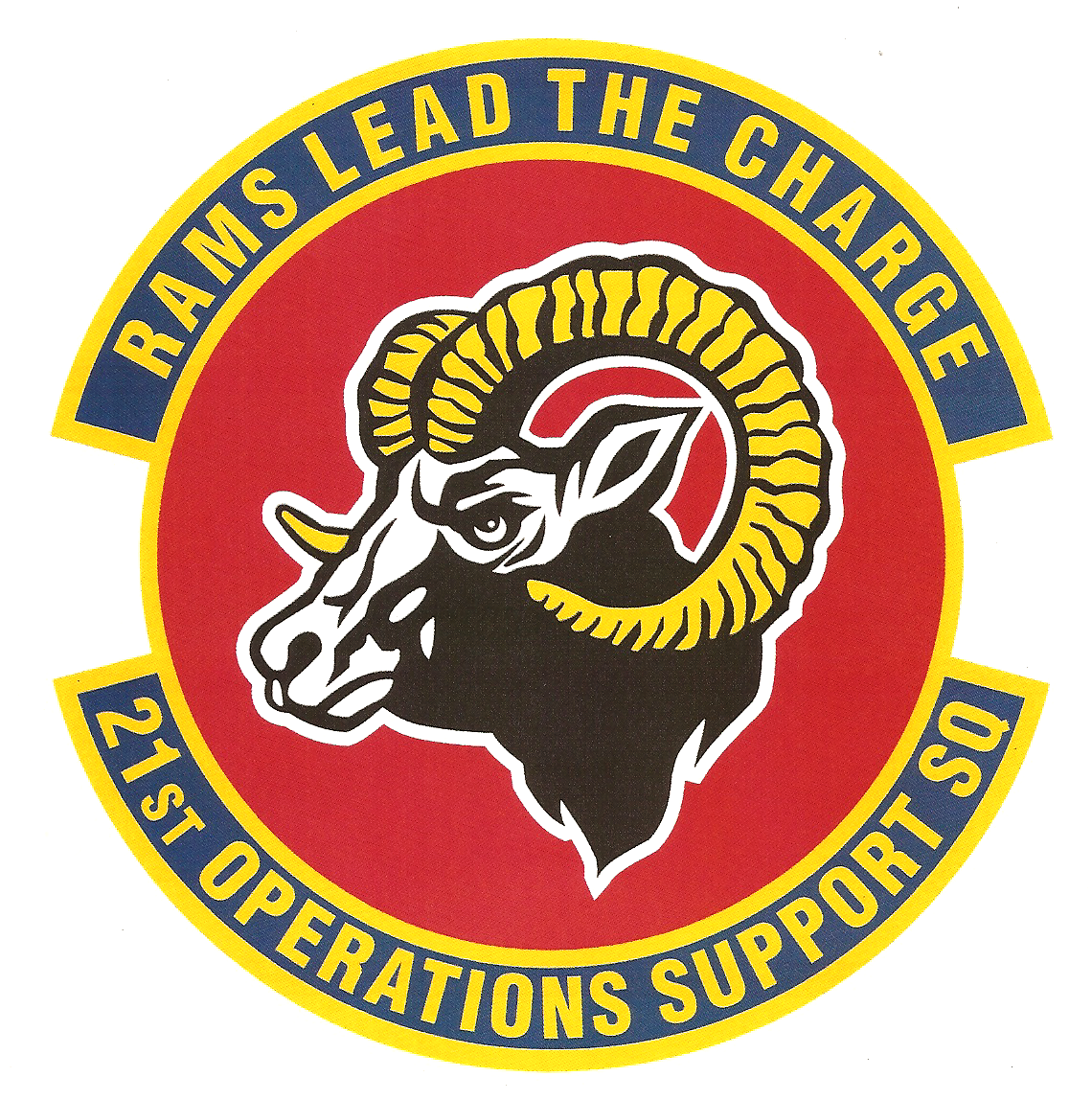
21st Operations Support Squadron

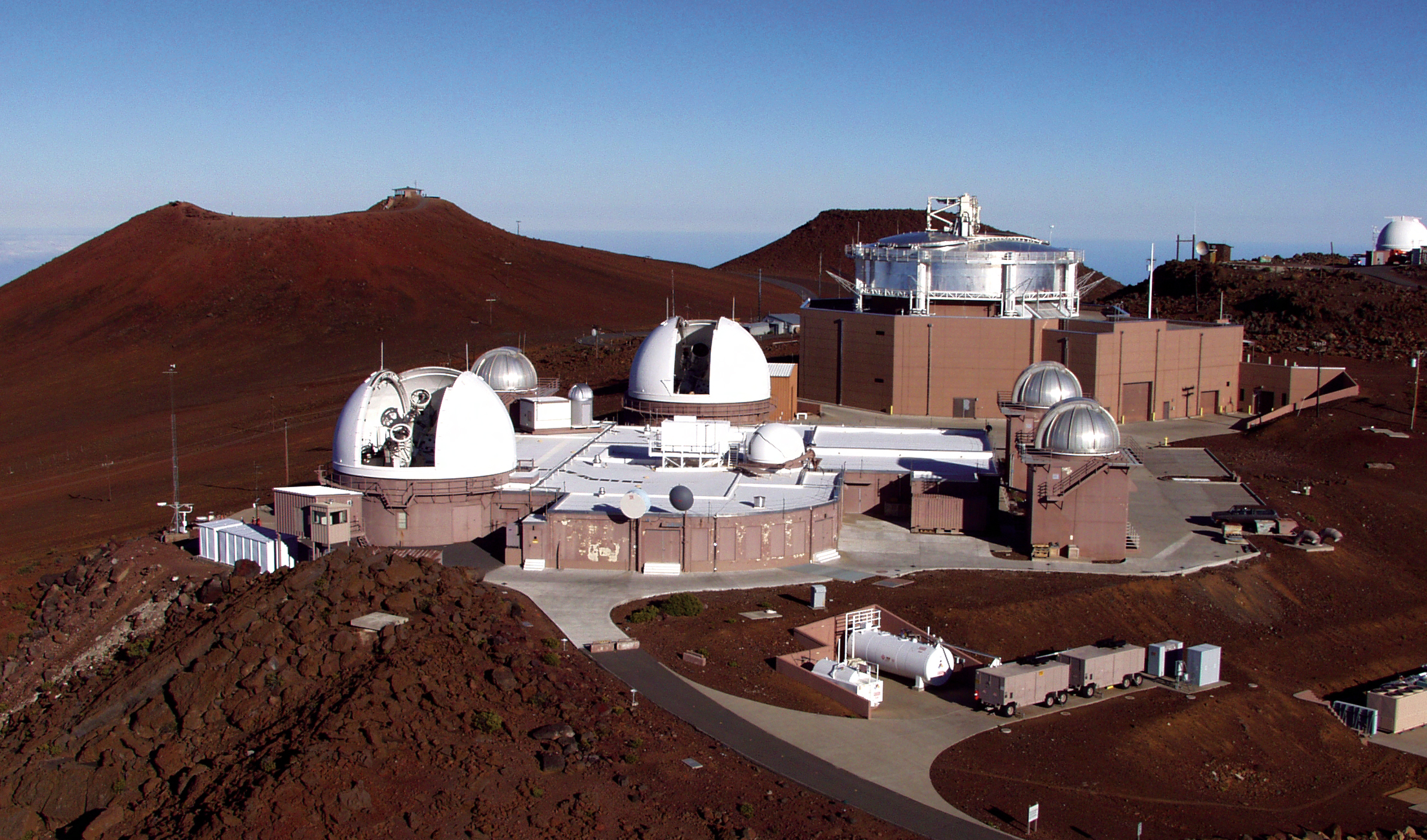
Ground-Based Electro-Optical Deep Space Surveillance (GEODSS) site at the Maui Space Surveillance Complex.

The 21st Operations Group also operated a network of space surveillance radars across the Earth. The AN/FPS-79 was operated by the 19th Space Surveillance Squadron at Pirinçlik Air Base, Turkey. The radar and its predecessor had been conducting operations since 1955 and monitored space and missile launches out of the Soviet Union and Russia, including the launch of Sputnik, Vostok, and events related to Operation Desert Storm until it was inactivated in 1999. The 21st Operations Group also gained the 20th Space Surveillance Squadron, which had operated the AN/FPS-85 at Eglin Air Force Base since 1988. Detachments of the 18th Space Surveillance Squadron operated the Ground-based Electro-Optical Deep Space Surveillance System (GEODSS), with Detachment 1 operating at Socorro, New Mexico, Detachment 2 at Diego Garcia, and Detachment 3 at the Maui Space Surveillance Complex, replacing the older network of Baker-Nunn cameras. Detachment 4 operated the Transportable Optical System (TOS) at Morón Air Base starting in September 1998, and was renamed the Moron Optical Surveillance System (MOSS) in 1999. In November 2005, Morón Air Base would receive the El Raven telescope and in June 2006 it would gain the RO4 high-volume superior resolution camera. The 21st Operations Group also operated two passive radars, with the Deep Space Tracking System antennas operated by the 3rd Space Surveillance Squadron at Misawa Air Base, Japan and 5th Space Surveillance Squadron at RAF Feltwell. The Low Altitude Space Surveillance System was operated by the 4th Space Surveillance Squadron at Lackland Air Force Base, Detachment 1 at Osan Air Base, Korea, the 1st Space Surveillance Squadron at Griffiss Air Force Base, and the 17th Space Surveillance Squadron at RAF Edzell. In 1995, the 1st Space Surveillance Squadron inactivated, and in 1996 the 17th Space Surveillance Squadron followed suit, with Detachment 1 inactivating in 1997. The remaining passive radar systems were shut down, with the 5th Space Surveillance Squadron inactivating in January 2002 and the 3rd Space Surveillance Squadron following in February 2002.

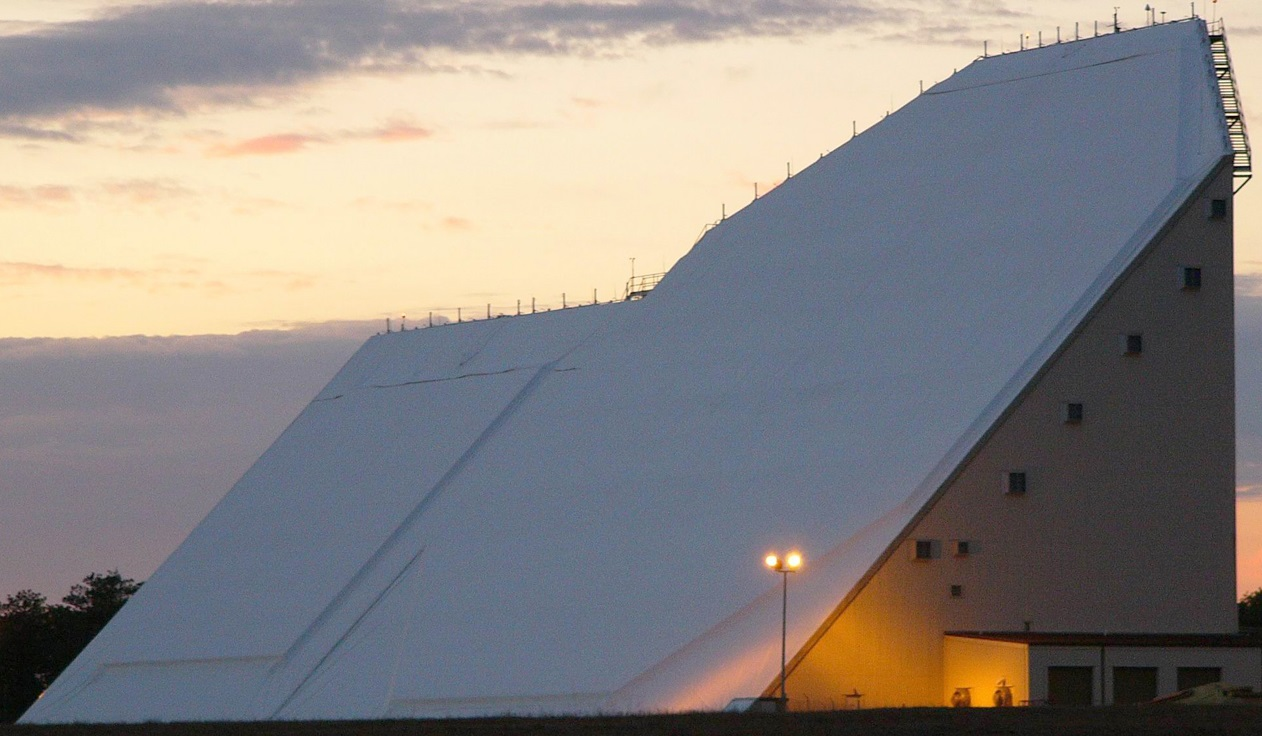
AN/FPS-85 radar at Eglin Air Force Base.

The 21st Operations Group maintained a set of command and control squadrons to coordinate its primary missions. The 1st Command and Control Squadron, based at Cheyenne Mountain Air Force Station, was responsible for tasking the United States Space Surveillance Network and maintained the space catalog. The 2nd Command and Control Squadron operated out of Schriever Air Force Base and controlled the passive space surveillance network. The 3rd Command and Control Squadron was based at Offutt Air Force Base and served as the alternate Missile Warning Center. In 1998, the 2nd Command and Control Squadron would transfer to the 14th Air Force as passive space surveillance units began inactivating, while new capabilities at the Missile Warning Center rendered the 3rd Command and Control Squadron redundant, inactivating in 1999. The 1st Command and Control Squadron was realigned under the 614th Air and Space Operations Center in June 2008. In 1996, the 821st Space Group was activated at Buckley Air National Guard Base under the 21st Space Wing, gaining the Defense Support Program and its squadrons from the 21st Operations Group. On 1 October 1994, the 21st Crew Training Squadron inactivated and in 1997 the 84th Airlift Flight, which operated the Learjet C-21 for Air Force Space Command, was transferred to Air Mobility Command.

21st Operations Group space control squadrons
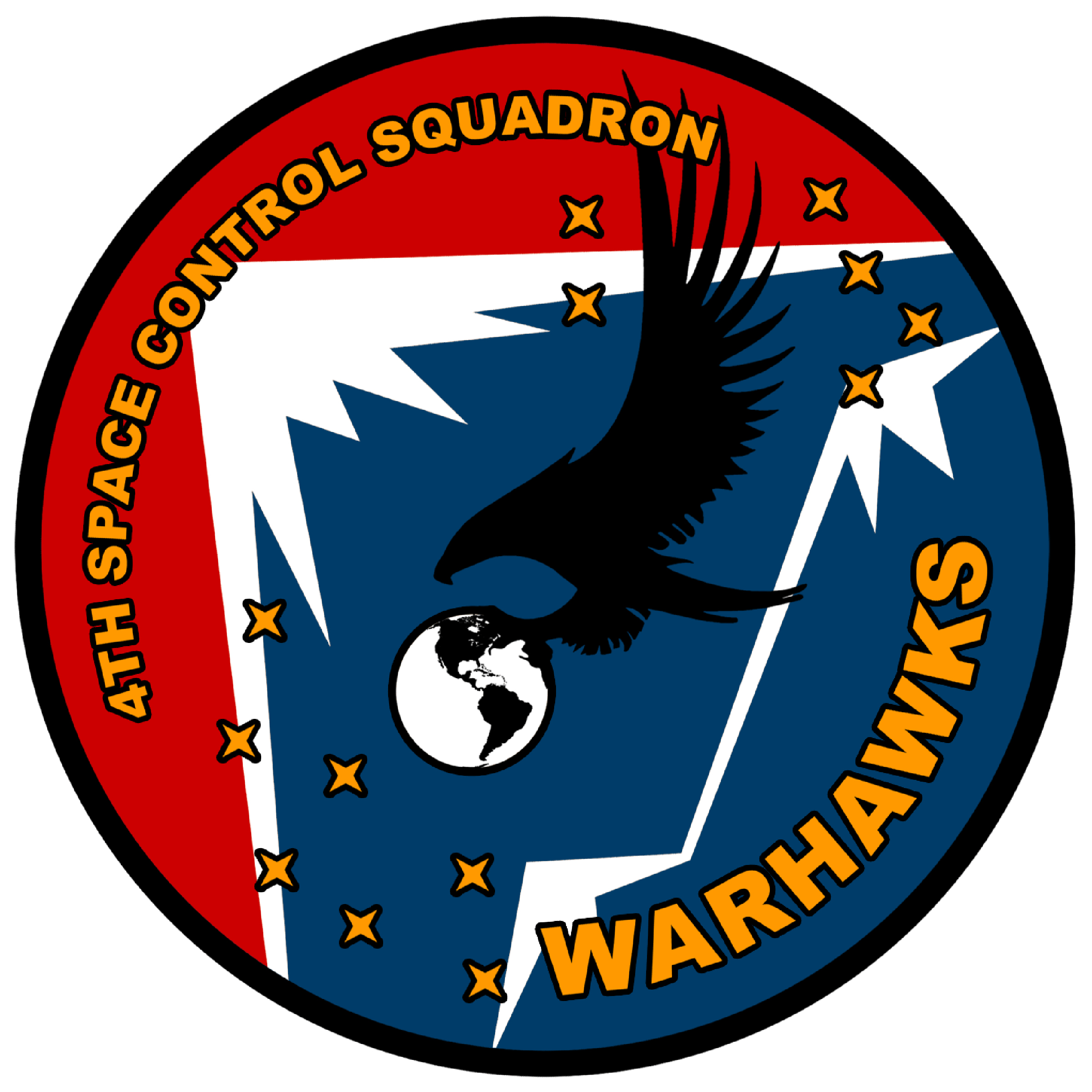
4th Space Control Squadron

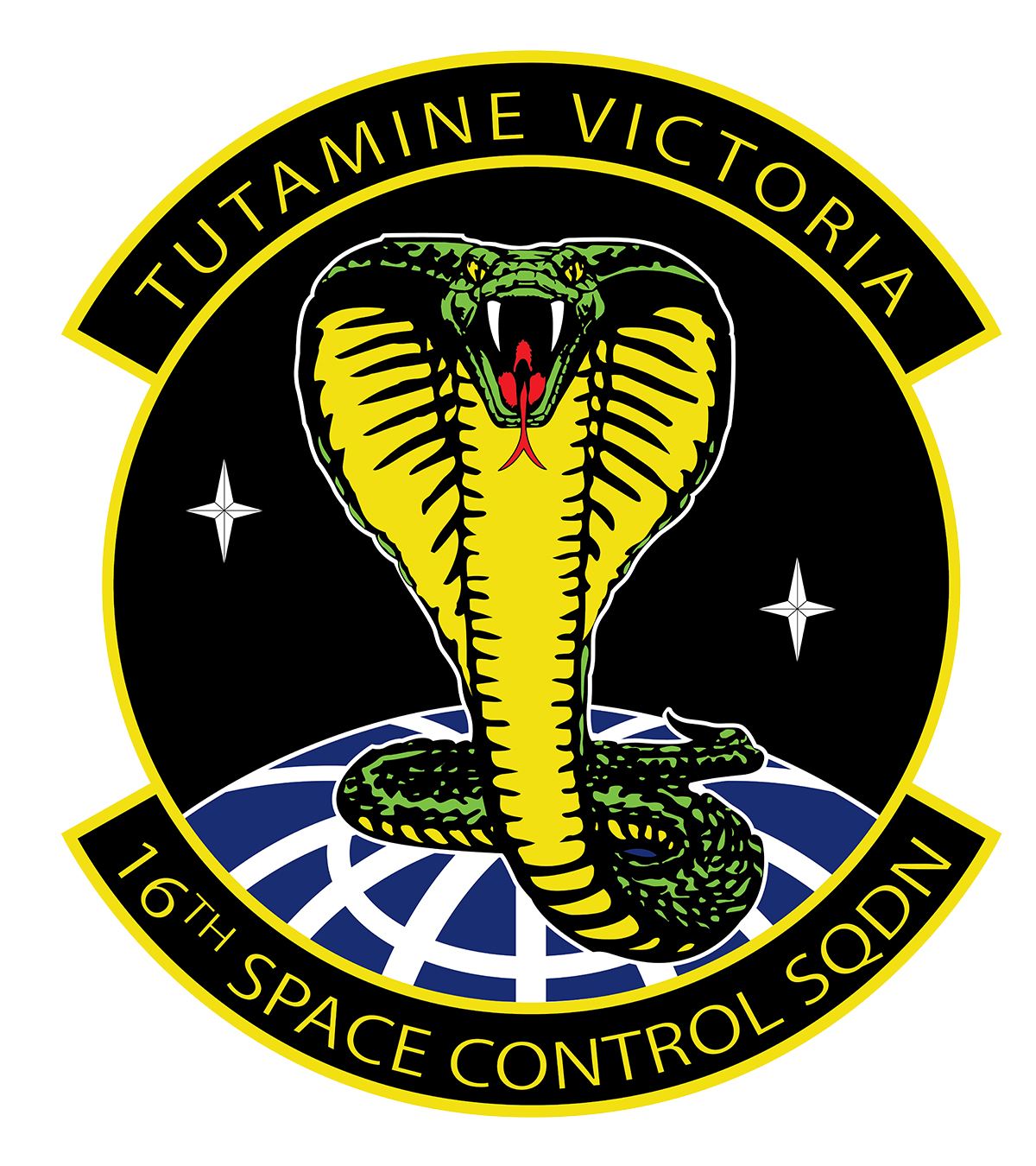
16th Space Control Squadron

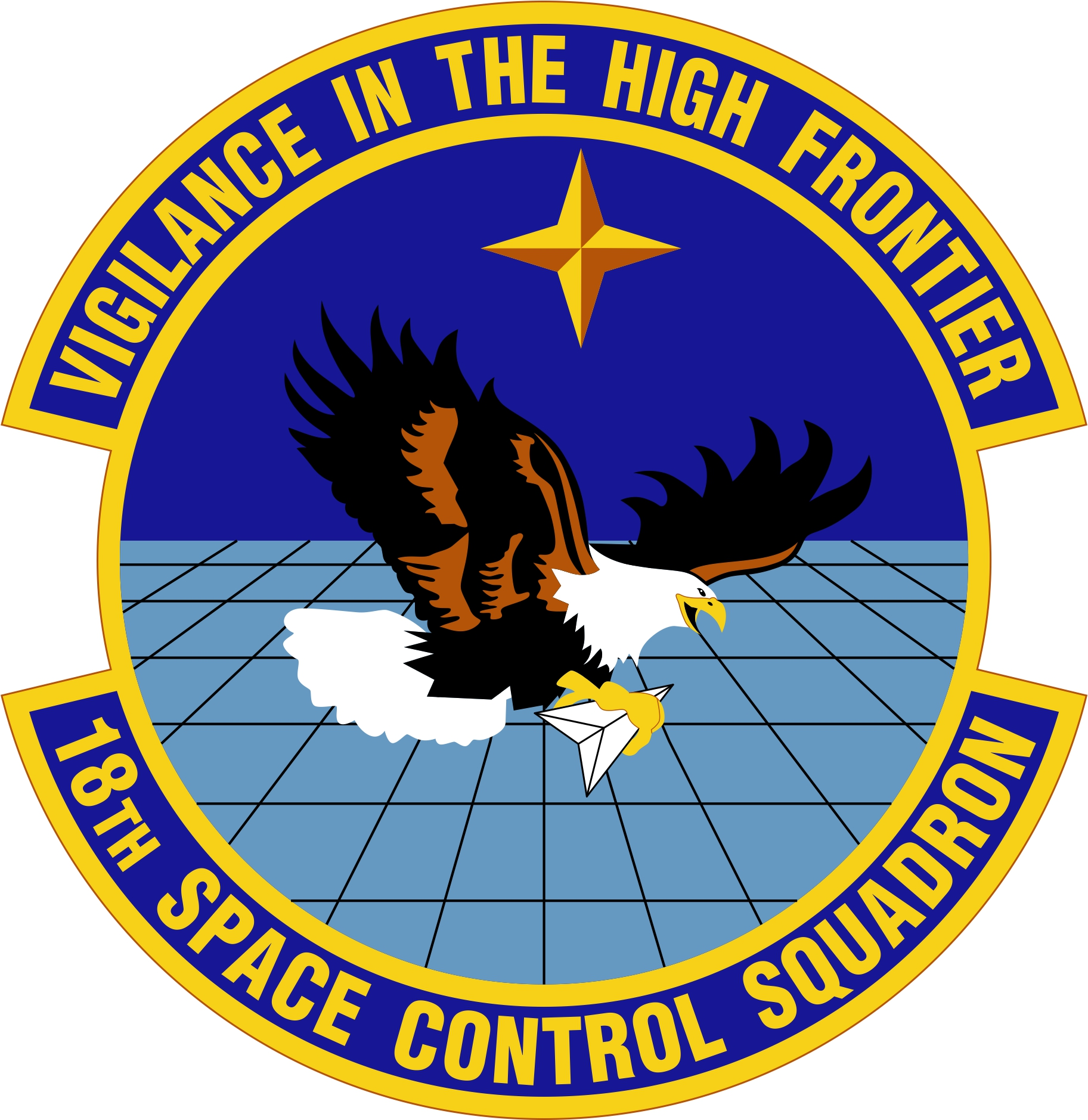
18th Space Control Squadron

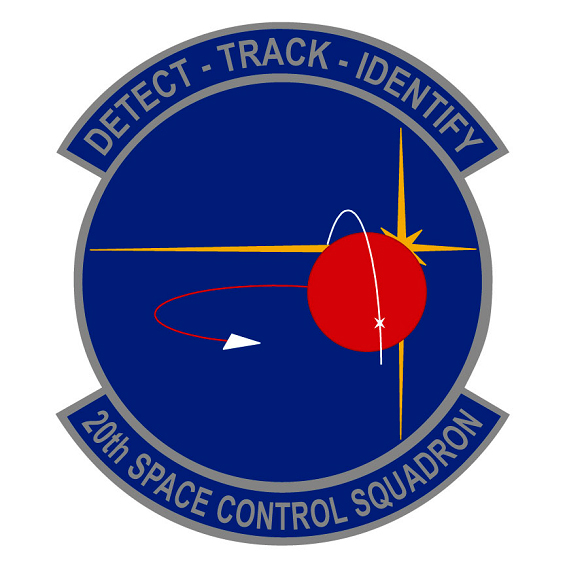
20th Space Control Squadron

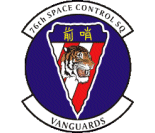
76th Space Control Squadron (pre–2008)

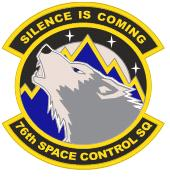
76th Space Control Squadron (post–2008)

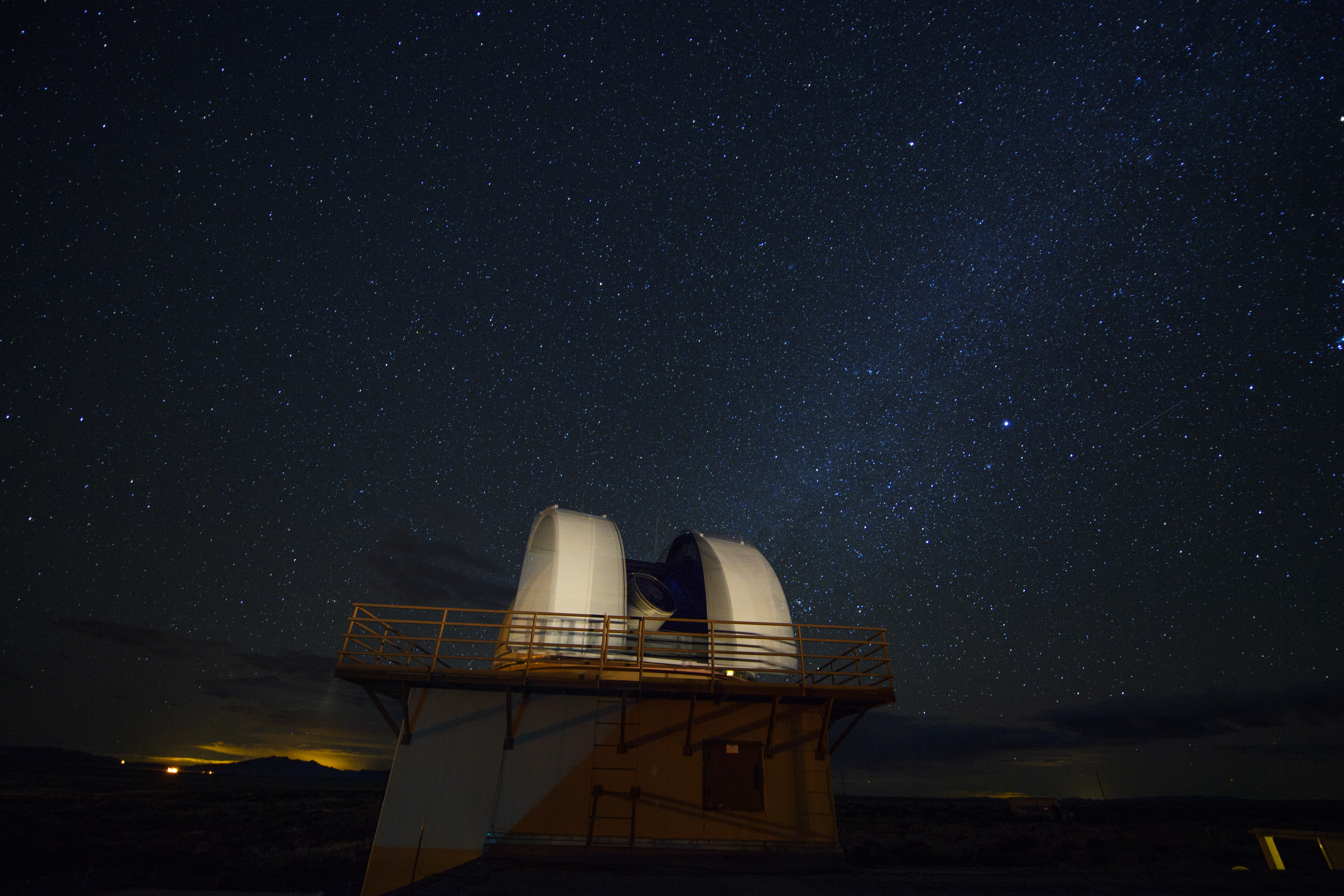
Ground-Based Electro-Optical Deep Space Surveillance (GEODSS) site at White Sands Missile Range.

Following increased proliferation of debris and international actors in space, the 21st Operations Group began to transition from space surveillance to space control, or counterspace, renaming its squadrons. Space control squadrons were intended to guard against hostile action while also preventing collision with space debris. The first space control squadron, the 76th Space Operations Squadron was activated at Peterson Air Force Base in 2000 and renamed the 76th Space Control Squadron in January 2001, receiving initial operational capability on the Counter Communications System in September 2004. On 1 March 2003, all space surveillance squadrons were redesignated as space control squadrons. In July 2005, the 4th Space Control Squadron at Holloman Air Force Base began to move into the space control mission in July 2005, activating its first counter communications system in April 2006, transferring to Peterson Air Force Base in July 2014 and absorbing the 76th Space Control Squadron in February 2015. In May 2007, the 16th Space Control Squadron was activated at Peterson Air Force Base as a defensive space control squadron. As part of an Air Force manpower saving program, the 18th Space Control Squadron was inactivated in April 2004, with its Detachments 1-4 directly realigned under the 21st Operations Group. In August 2004, the 20th Space Control Squadron activated Detachment 1 at Naval Support Activity Dahlgren to operate the Air Force Space Surveillance System (formerly the Navy Space Surveillance System) and the Alternate Space Control Center. Detachment 1, 20th Space Control Squadron was inactivated in April 2010, followed by the inactivation of Detachment 4, 21st Operations Group at Morón Air Base in March 2013. In April 2013, the 13th Space Warning Squadron gained oversight of the Cobra Dane radar at Eareckson Air Station, Alaska. On 20 April 2016, the GEODSS detachments transitioned from the 21st Operations Group to the 20th Space Control Squadron and the 18th Space Control Squadron was reactivated on 22 July 2016 at Vandenberg Air Force Base.

In 2019, the 721st Operations Group was activated and gained the 4th Space Control Squadron and 16th Space Control Squadron.

=== The Space Force's space domain awareness delta ===
Mission Delta 2 squadrons
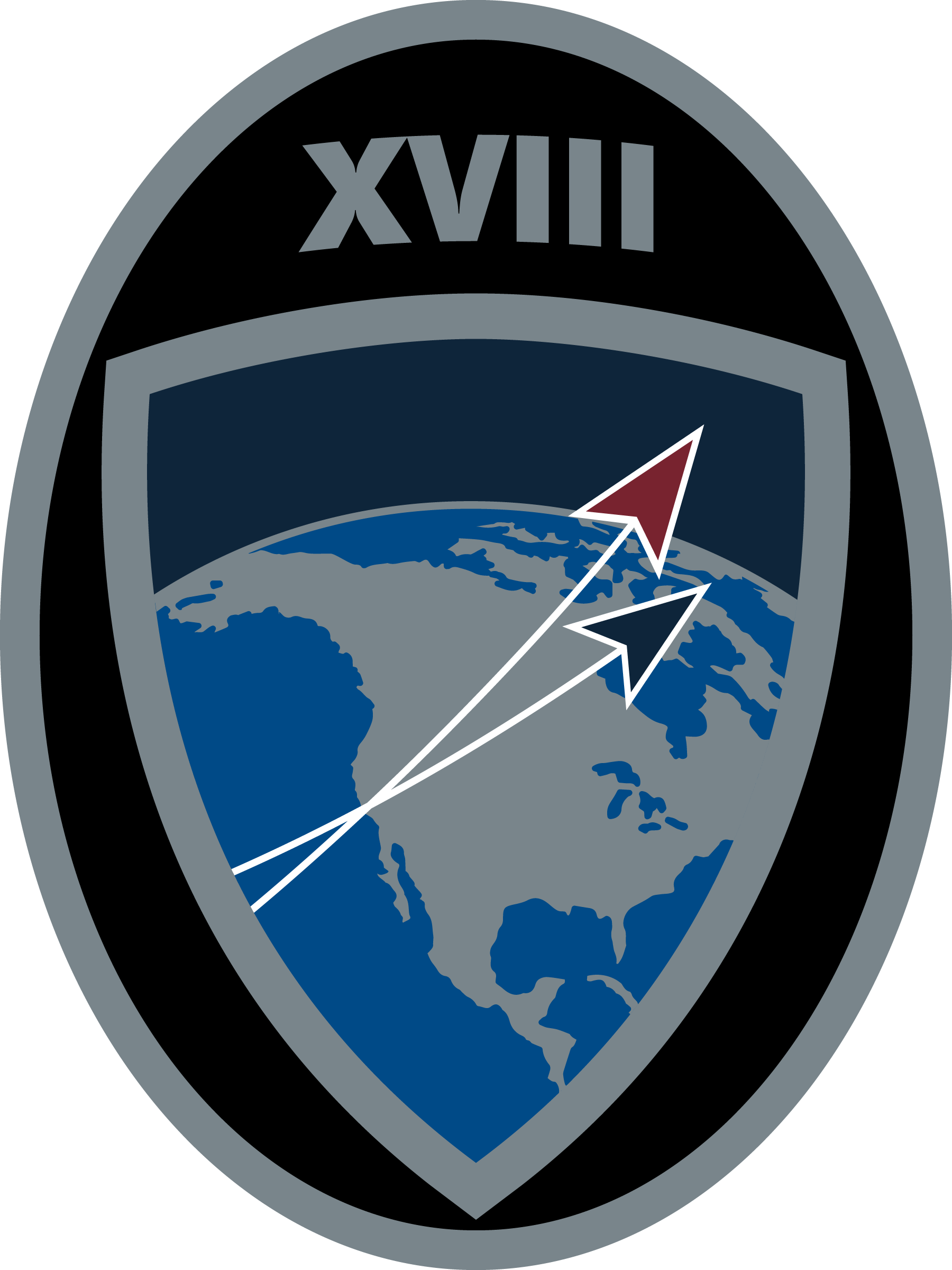
18th Space Defense Squadron

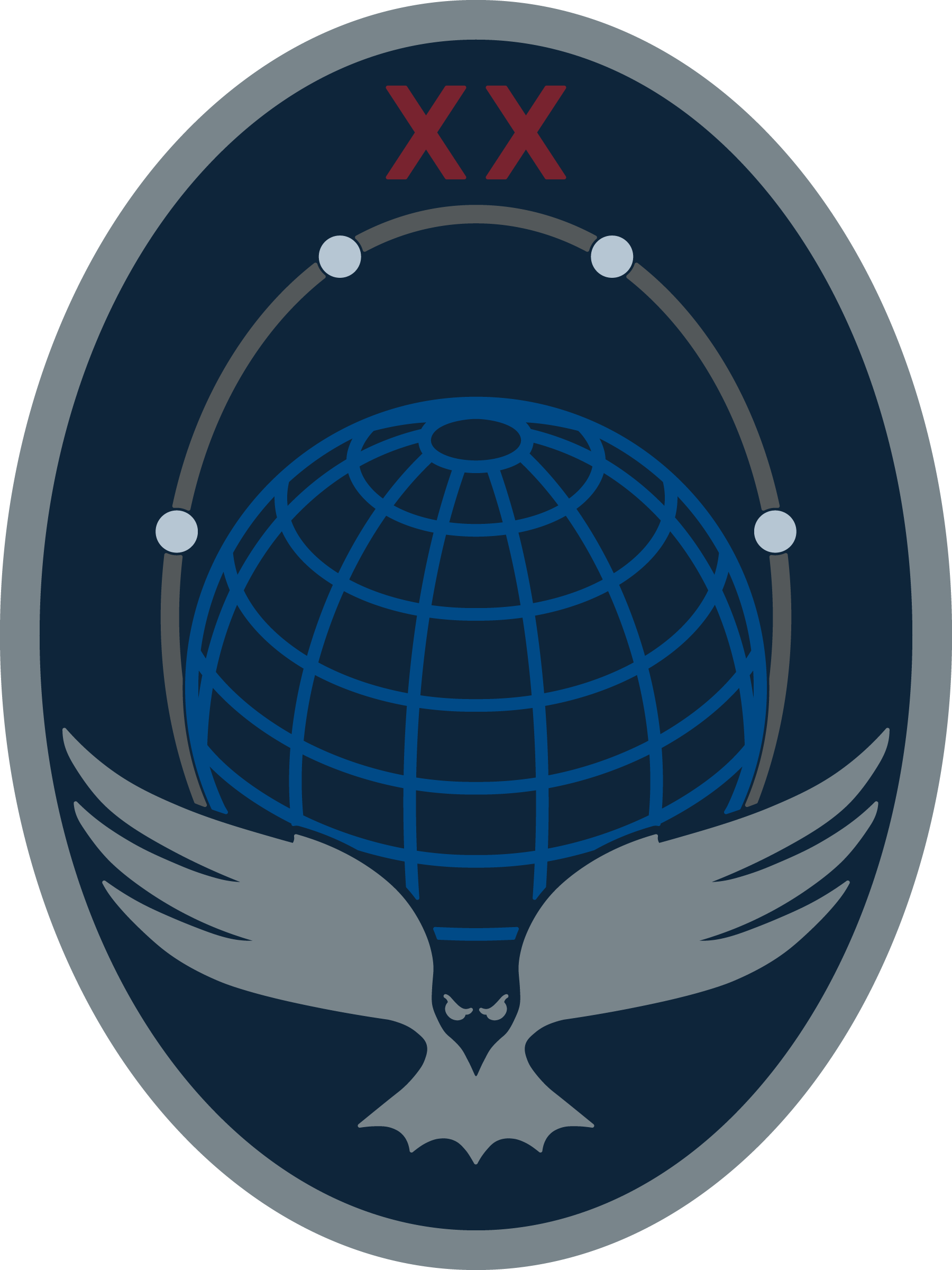
20th Space Surveillance Squadron

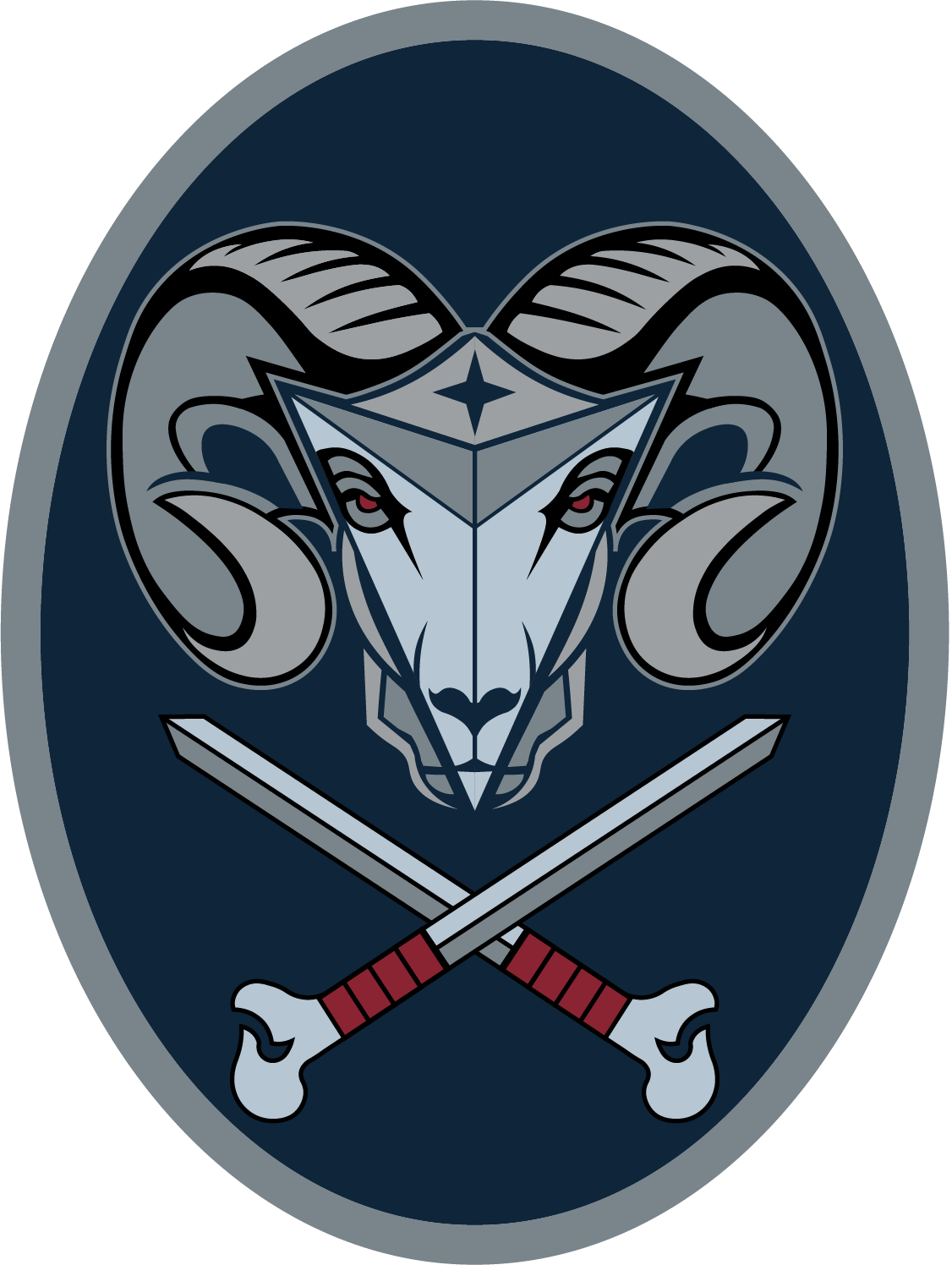
21st Operations Support Squadron

Following the establishment of the United States Space Force, the 21st Space Wing and 21st Operations Group remained units of the U.S. Air Force assigned to United States Space Force. On 24 July 2020, the Space Force reorganized its wings and groups into deltas, inactivating the 21st Space Wing and redesignated the 21st Operations Group as Space Delta 2. Space Delta 2 transferred its space warning squadrons to Space Delta 4, retaining its space surveillance awareness and space defense squadrons. On 21 October 2020, with the redesignation of United States Space Force as Space Operations Command, Space Delta 2 transferred from a unit of the United States Air Force to the United States Space Force. On 31 October 2024 it was redesignated Mission Delta 2 and gained sustainment responsibilities, along with organic cyber defense and intelligence forces.

== Symbolism ==
Emblems of Mission Delta 2 and its predecessors
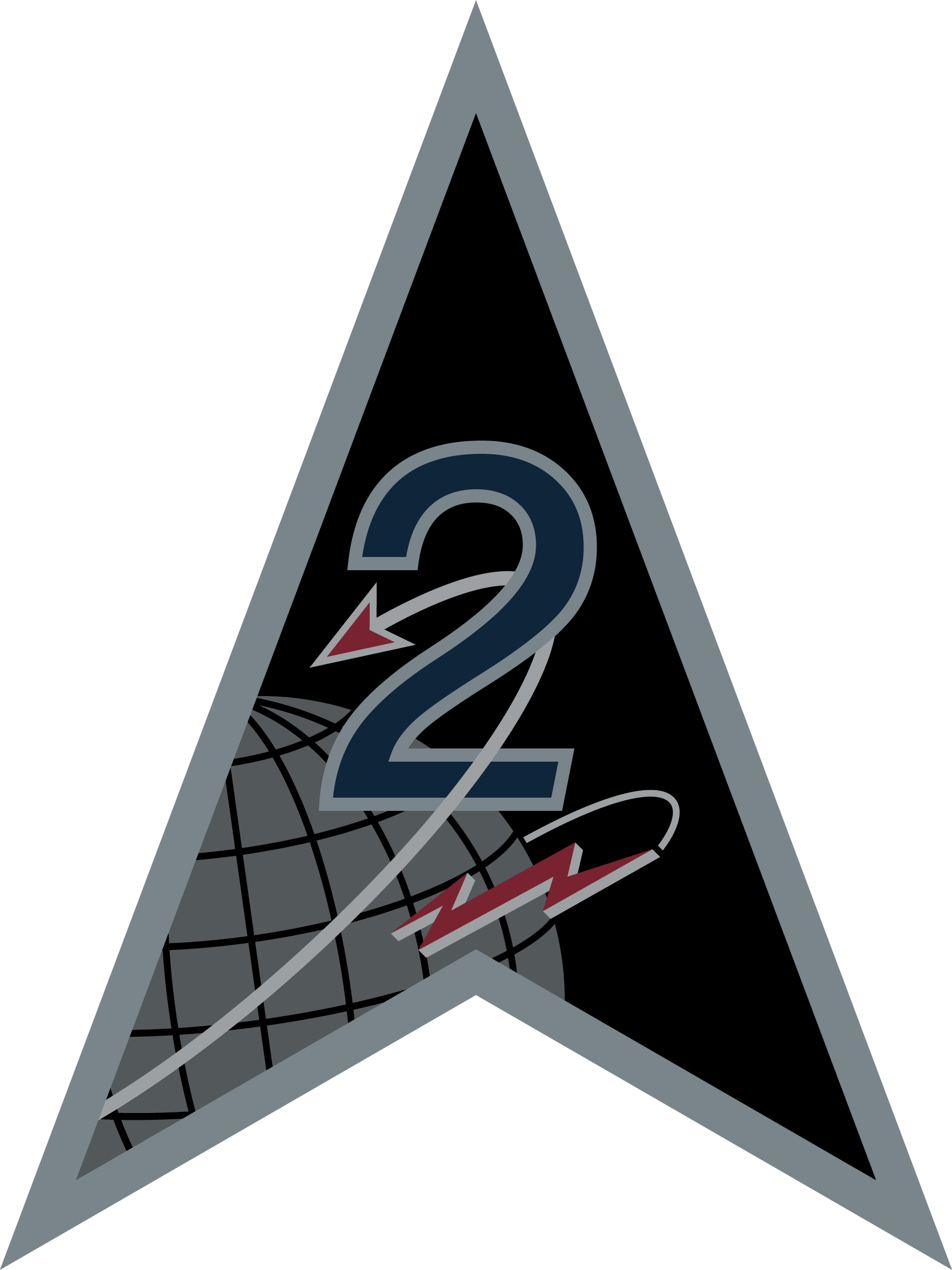
Mission Delta 2 (2020–present)

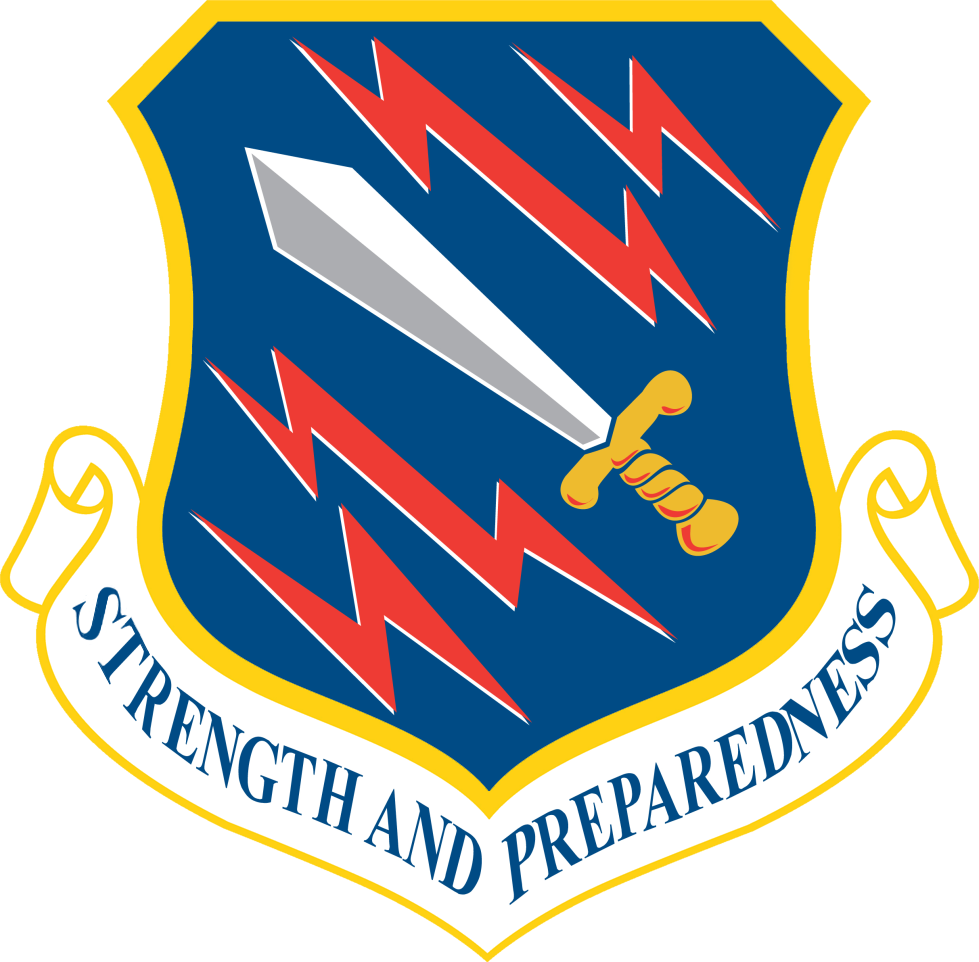
21st Operations Group (1957–2019)

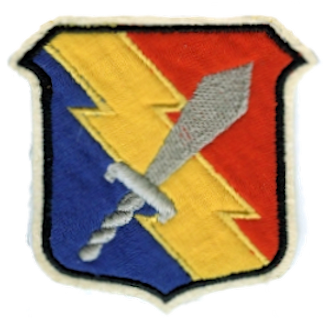
21st Fighter Group (1944–1946)

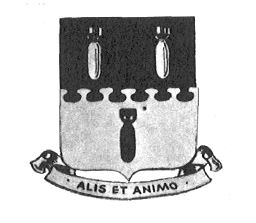
21st Bombardment Group (1942–1943)

=== 21st Operations Group emblem ===
The 21st Operations Group emblem was shared with the 21st Space Wing and its other groups. The blue represents the vast blue sky-the 21st's area of operations. The upraised sword indicates the strength and readiness of the wing to perform its mission, whether in peace or war. The lightning is symbolic of the heavens beyond, the stormy power and protective Lord. The Air Force blue, red, and yellow signifies the three fighter squadrons of the 21st Fighter–Bomber Wing. The emblem was approved on 23 July 1957.

The motto "Strength and Preparedness" is derived from the original motto of the 21st Fighter-bomber Wing "Fortitudo et Preparatio."

== Structure ==
Emblem	Name	Function	Headquarters	Space domain awareness systems	Detachments
Squadrons
	15th Space Surveillance Squadron	Research and development	Maui, Hawaii	Ground-based Electro-Optical Deep Space Surveillance (Detachments 1, 2, and MSSC)	*Detachment 1: White Sands Missile Range, New Mexico; *Detachment 2: Naval Support Facility Diego Garcia, British Indian Ocean Territory; *MSSC, Maui, Hawaii (operated directly by the main squadron unit rather than a detached element)
	18th Space Defense Squadron	Space domain awareness	Vandenberg Space Force Base, California	Space Defense Operations Center; Space Catalog	
	19th Space Defense Squadron	Space domain awareness for government, civilian, and international users	Naval Support Facility Dahlgren, Virginia		
	20th Space Surveillance Squadron	Space domain awareness	Eglin Air Force Base, Florida	AN/FPS-85 phased array radar Space Fence (Det 4)	Detachment 4: Redstone Arsenal, Alabama, and Ronald Reagan Ballistic Missile Defense Test Site, Marshall Islands
	2nd Sustainment Squadron	Sustainment	Peterson Space Force Base, Colorado		
Detachments
	Detachment 1	Weather reconnaissance	Suitland, Maryland		
	Detachment 2	Space domain awareness	Kirtland Air Force Base, New Mexico		

== List of commanders ==
No.	Commander		Term			Ref
No.	Portrait	Name	Took office	Left office	Duration	Ref
1	Matthew Cantore	Colonel; Matthew Cantore	24 July 2020	14 June 2021	325 days	
2	Marc A. Brock	Colonel; Marc A. Brock	14 June 2021	23 June 2023	2 years, 9 days	
2	Raj Agrawal	Colonel; Raj Agrawal	23 June 2023	3 July 2025	2 years, 10 days	
3	Barry A. Croker	Colonel; Barry A. Croker	3 July 2025	Incumbent	1 year, 113 days	

== See also ==
- No. 1 Space Surveillance Unit
