= 21st Operations Support Squadron =

U.S. Space Force unit

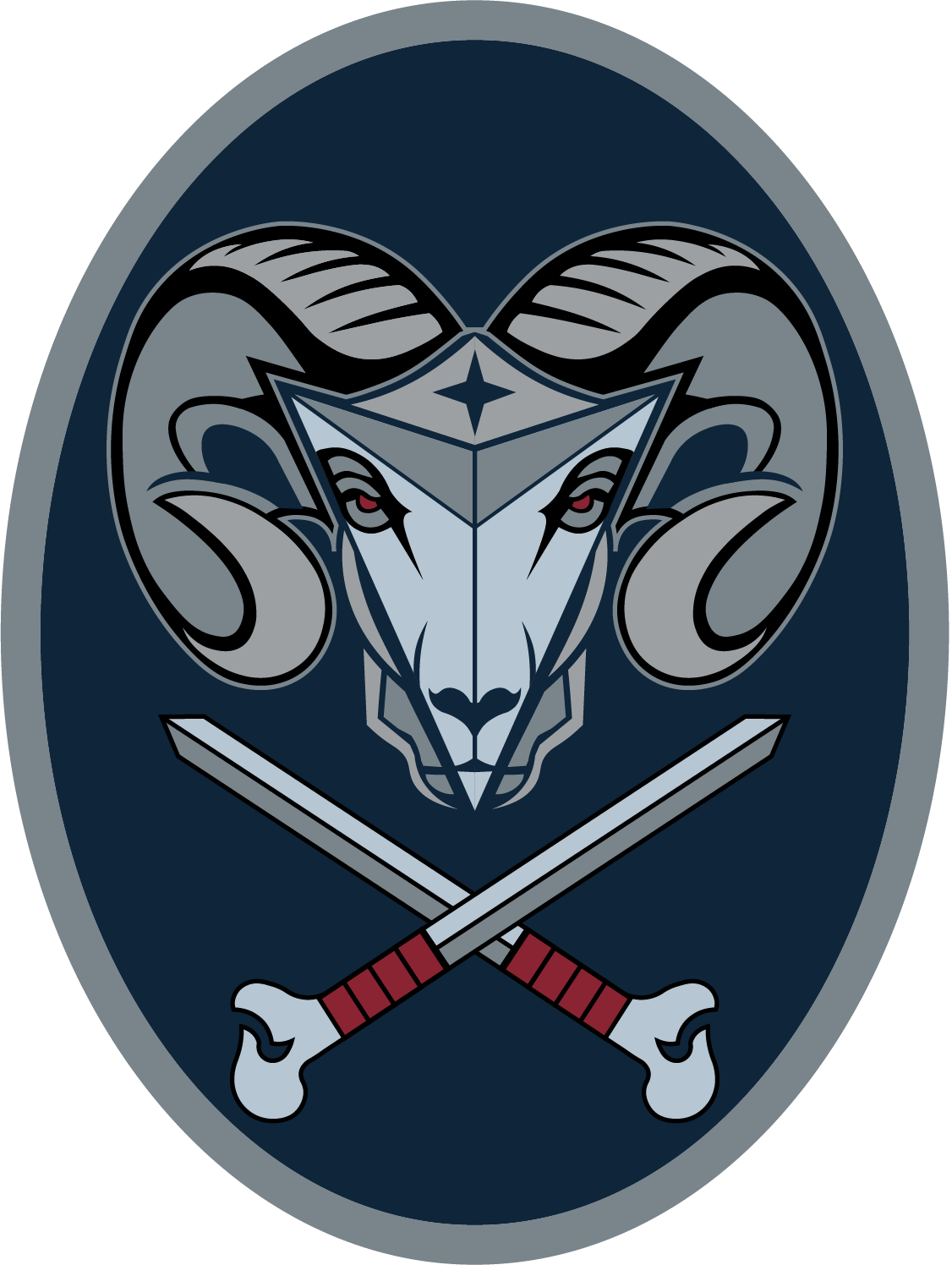
- Squadron emblem
- Active: 1991; 1992 – present
- Country: United States
- Branch: United States Space Force
- Type: Squadron
- Role: Operations support
- Part of: Space Delta 2
- Headquarters: Peterson Space Force Base, Colorado, U.S.

Commanders
- Notable commanders: Troy Endicott

Insignia
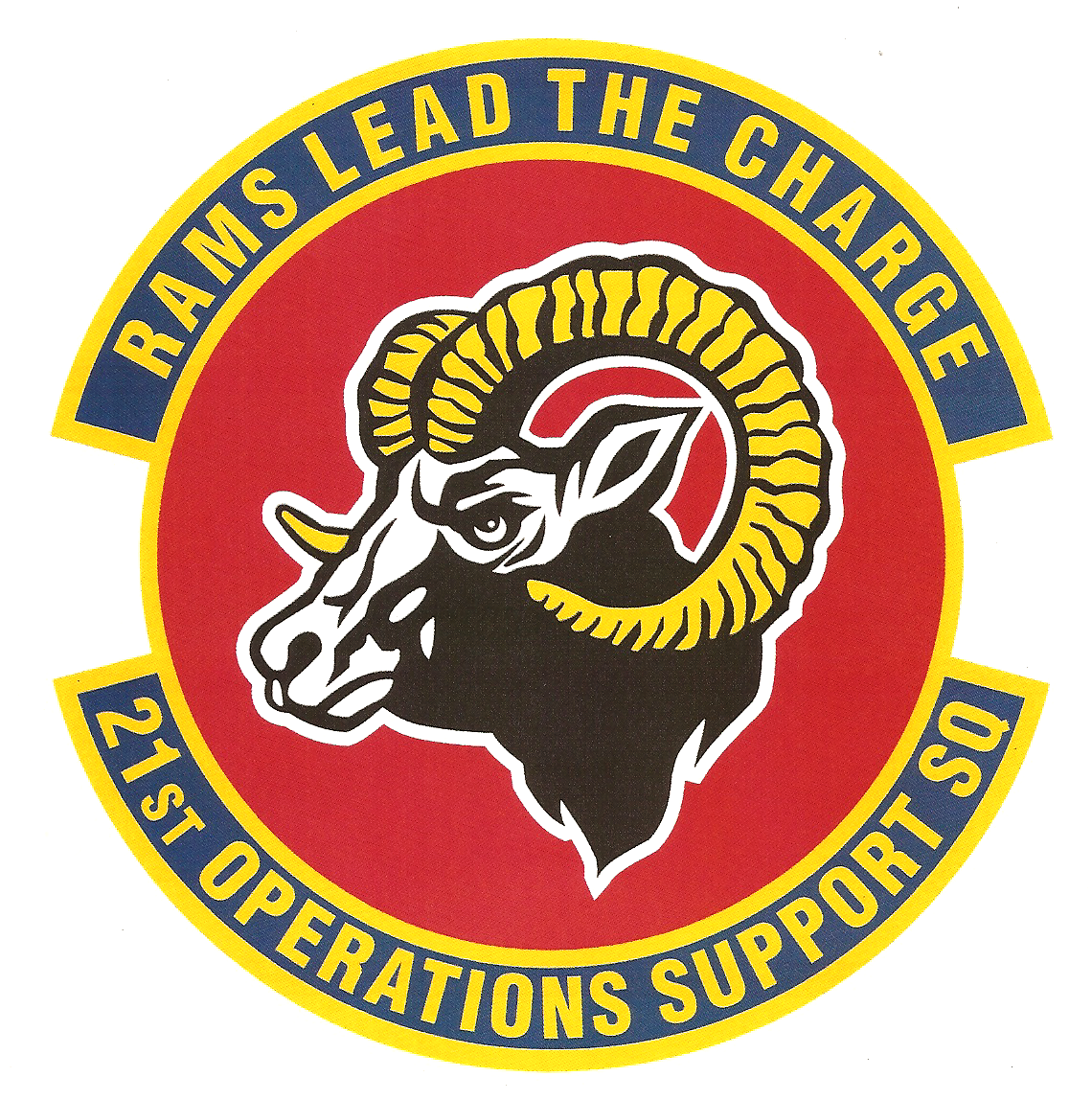
- Former 21st Operations Support Squadron emblem

The 21st Operations Support Squadron (21 OSS) is a United States Space Force unit. Assigned to Space Operations Command's Space Delta 2, it provides operations support to the delta by providing weather information, coordinating the delta's squadron operations, and providing intelligence and administrative support. It is headquartered at Peterson Space Force Base, Colorado.

== History ==
=== Lineage ===
- Constituted as 21st Operations Support Squadron from the consolidation of the 21st Airdrome Squadron and 21st Operations Squadron on 25 September 1991

Inactivated on 19 December 1991
Reactivated on 15 May 1992

=== Assignments ===
- 21st Operations Group, 15 May 1992 – 24 July 2020
- Space Delta 2, 24 July 2020 – present

== List of commanders ==
- Lt Col E. McConnell
- Lt Col Troy Endicott, May 2009
- Lt Col Colin Connor, 4 May 2011
- Lt Col Robert Hutt, June 2013 – July 2015
- Lt Col Jeffrey E. Weisler, May 2017 – June 2019

== See also ==
- Space Delta 2
