= 19th Space Defense Squadron =

U.S. Space Force unit

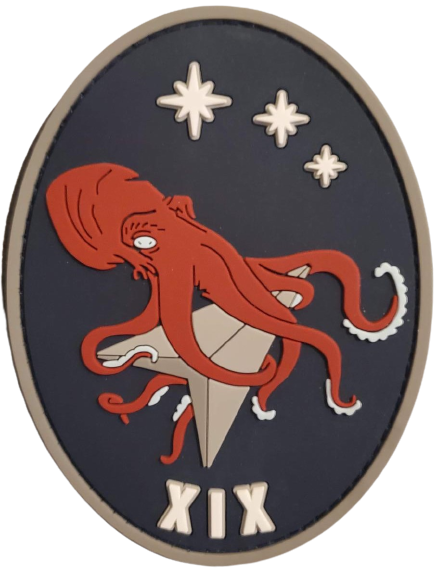
- 19 SDS emblem
- Active: 6 April 2022–present
- Country: United States
- Branch: United States Space Force
- Type: Squadron
- Role: Space domain awareness
- Part of: Space Delta 2
- Headquarters: Naval Support Facility Dahlgren, Virginia, U.S.

Commanders
- Commander: Lt Col Jose Almanzar

The 19th Space Defense Squadron (19 SDS) is a United States Space Force unit responsible for monitoring everything outside the geosynchronous Earth orbit. It is a part of Space Delta 2.

== List of commanders ==
- Lt Col Jonathan Smith, 6 April 2022 – July 2024
- Lt Col Jose Almanzar, July 2024 – present

== See also ==
- Space Delta 2
