= 3rd Command and Control Squadron =

3d Command and Control Squadron
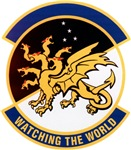
- Active: 11 January 1996-31 July 1999
- Country: United States
- Branch: United States Air Force
- Type: Command and Control
- Role: Space Surveillance C2
- Part of: AFSPC
- Garrison/HQ: Offutt AFB, Nebraska
- Motto: WATCHING THE WORLD
- Decorations: AFOUA

The United States Air Force's 3d Command and Control Squadron (3 CACS) was a command and control unit located at Offutt AFB, Nebraska.

== Mission ==
The 3d Command and Control Squadron mission was shrouded in secrecy, however some details from its location, successor unit, and unit emblem shed some light on its operations.

== History ==
=== Emblem Significance ===
The device in the center of the disc is a Hydra, a creature which in mythology had several heads. These heads represent the multiple sensor sites of the 3 CACS, which provide continuous, worldwide surveillance. According to mythology, the hydra in combat could detect an attack from any direction even with the loss of a head. Similarly, 3 CACS maintains global coverage even if one of its sensors is put out of operation. This global capability is further amplified by the motto of the unit: "Watching the World".

The disc is divided by the colors black and white which represent night and day. The squadron works night and day. The line of USAF yellow dividing these colors symbolizes the sun which divides the day and night. The USAF blue in the scrolls suggests the sky, the medium in which the Air Force operates. The USAF yellow in the emblem's borders and in the lettering in the scroll denotes the excellence required of Air Force personnel. The motto describes the mission of 3 CACS and how the men and women continuously carry out their mission.

== Previous designations ==
- Detachment 1, 21st Operations Group (31 Jul 1999 – present?)
- 3d Command and Control Squadron (1 Mar 1996 – 31 Jul 1999)
- Detachment 1, 21st Operations Group (11 Jan 1996 – 1 Mar 1996)

== Commanders ==
- Major Michael J. Morgan (30 Jun 1998-Aug 1999)
- Lt Col Diann Latham (11 Mar 1996-???)

== Bases stationed ==
- Offutt AFB, Nebraska (1 Mar 1996 – 31 Jul 1999)

== Equipment Operated ==
- Communications System Segment Replacement (CSSR)
- Survivable Communications Integration System (SCIS)
- Command and Control Processing and Display System Replacement (CCPDS-R)

== Decorations ==
- Air Force Outstanding Unit Award
  - 1 Jan 1998-31 Dec 1998
  - 1 Oct 1997-30 Sep 1999
  - 1 Oct 1995-30 Sep 1997
