= List of United States Air Force space squadrons =

== Command & Control Squadrons ==
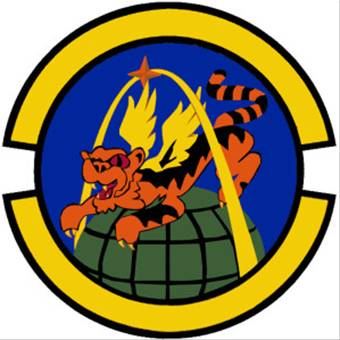
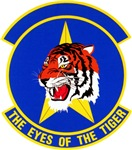
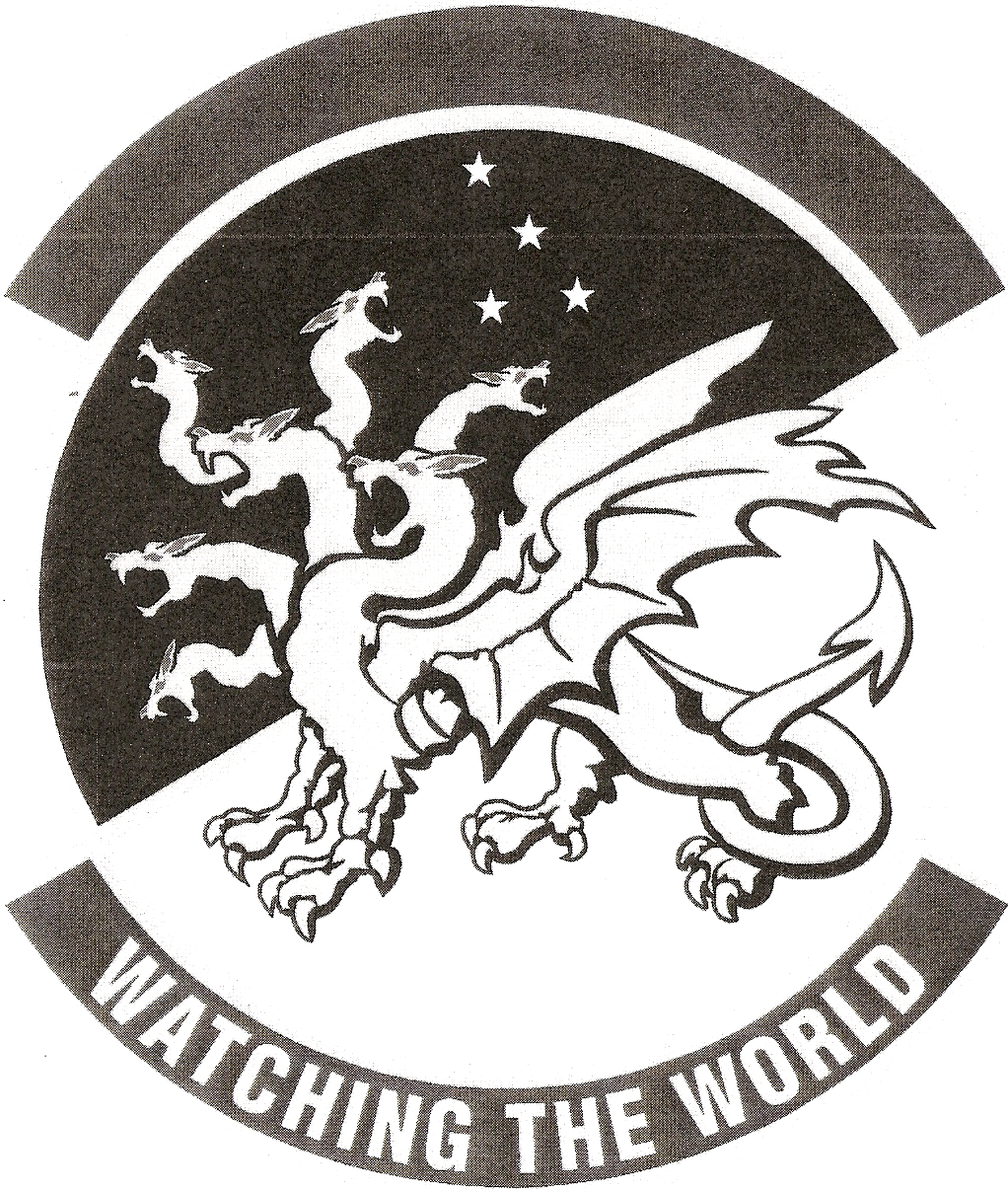
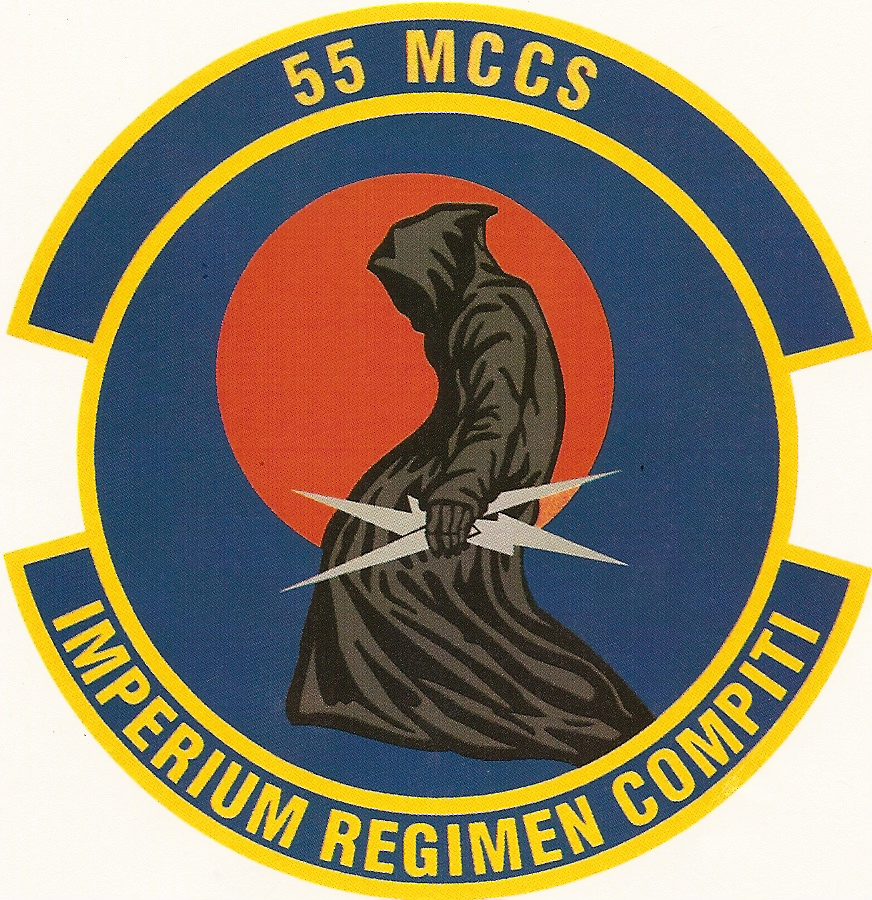
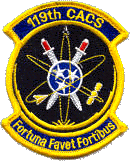
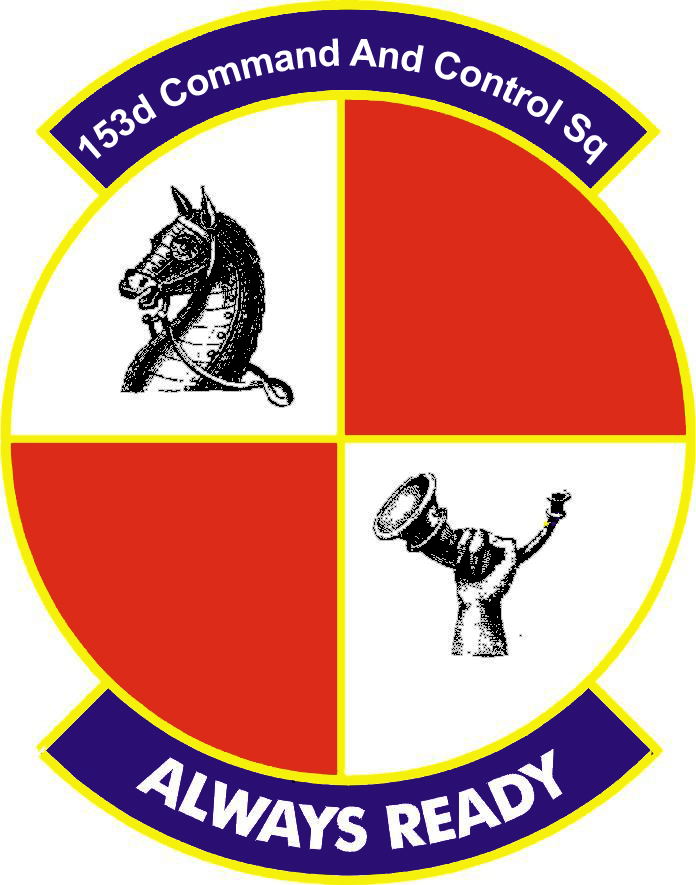
Squadron	Shield	Location	Nickname	System	Note
1st Command and Control Squadron		Cheyenne Mountain AFS		Space Surveillance Network	Renamed 1st Space Control Squadron
2d Command and Control Squadron		Schriever AFB		Low Altitude Space Surveillance & Deep Space Tracking System C2	Inactivated
3d Command and Control Squadron		Offutt AFB		Low Altitude Space Surveillance & Deep Space Tracking System C2	Inactivated 1999
4th Command and Control Squadron				Mobile Consolidated Command Center	Redesignated 153d Command and Control Squadron
55th Mobile Command and Control Squadron		Offutt AFB		Mobile Consolidated Command Center	Inactivated 2006
119th Command and Control Squadron		McGhee Tyson ANGB			ANG unit
153d Command and Control Squadron		F.E. Warren AFB		Mobile Consolidated Command Center	ANG unit
721st Mobile Command and Control Squadron		Peterson AFB			Inactivated 1998

== Space Control Squadrons ==
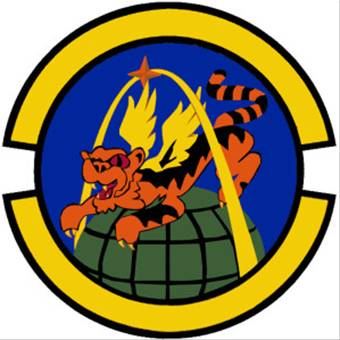
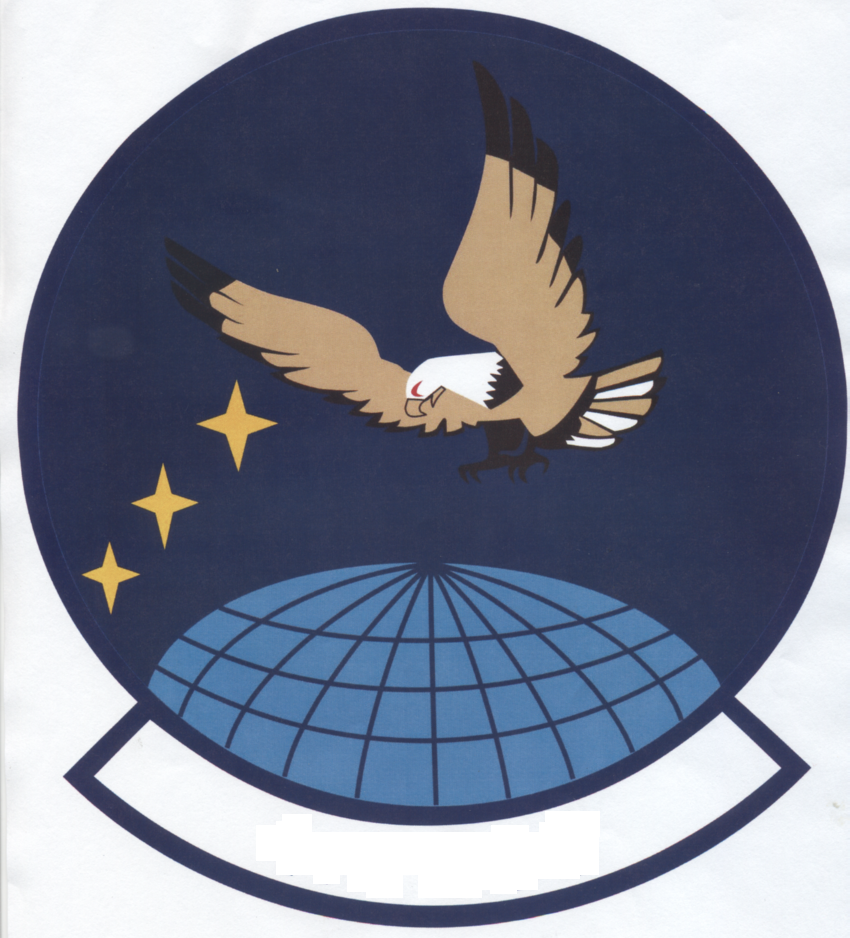
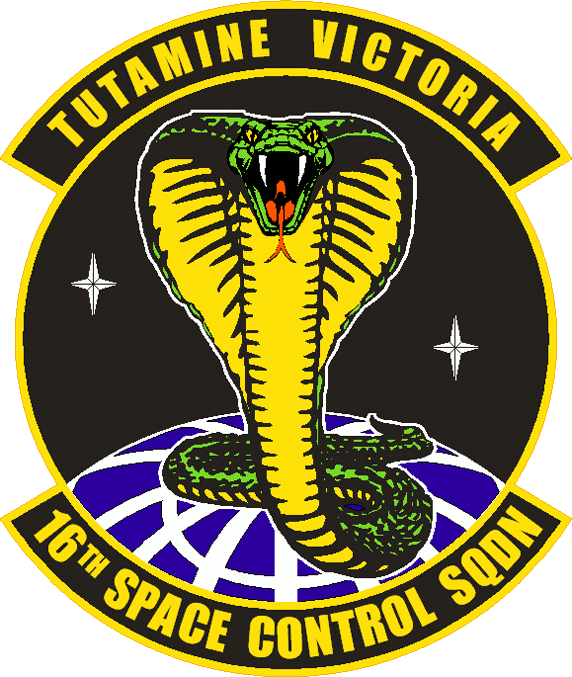
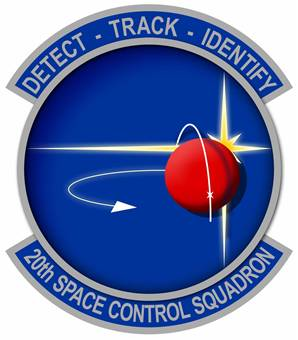
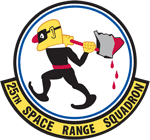
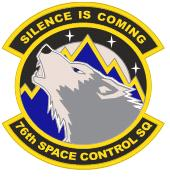
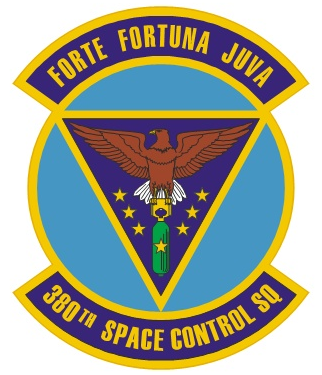
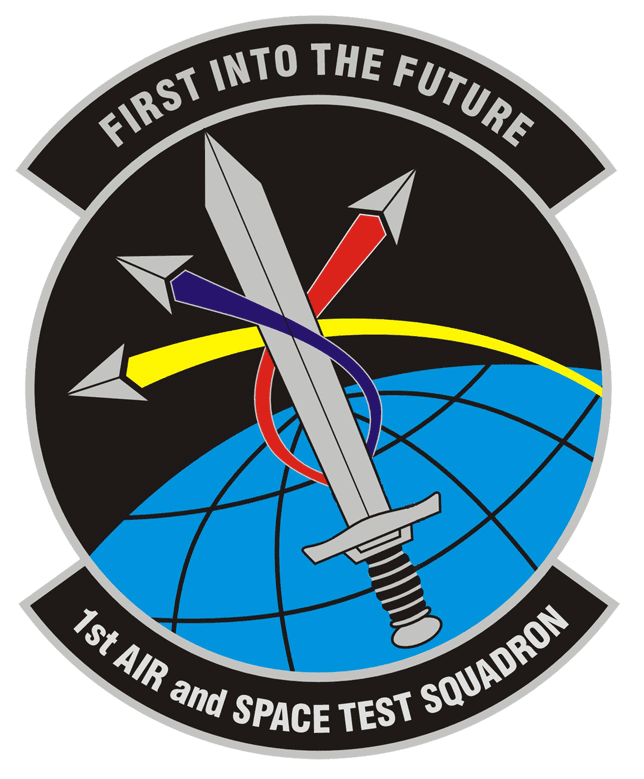
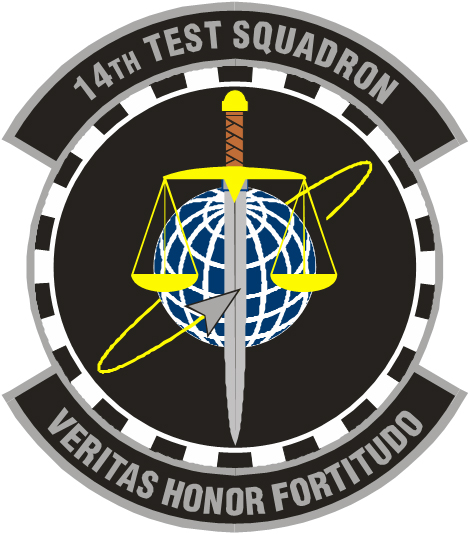
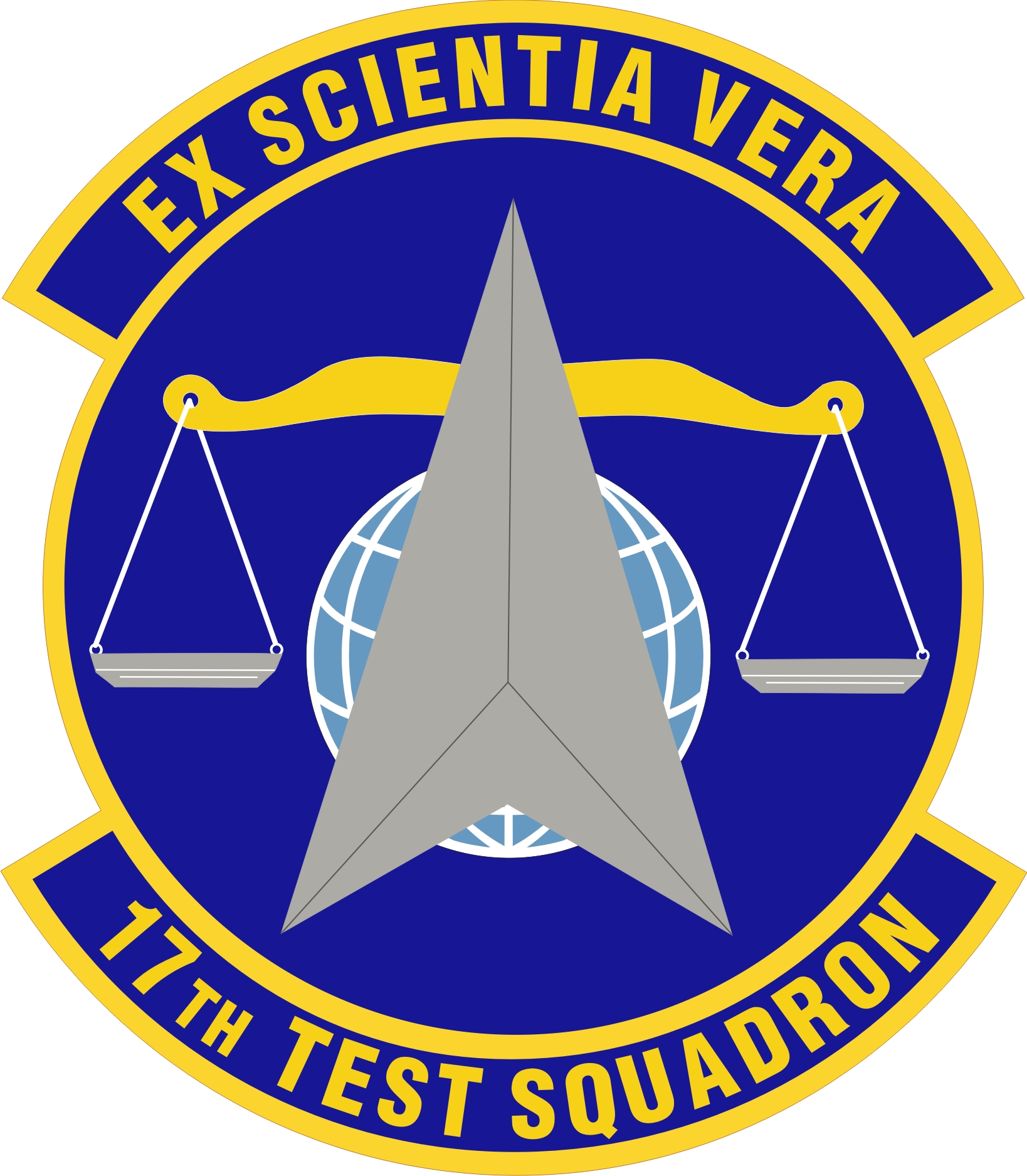
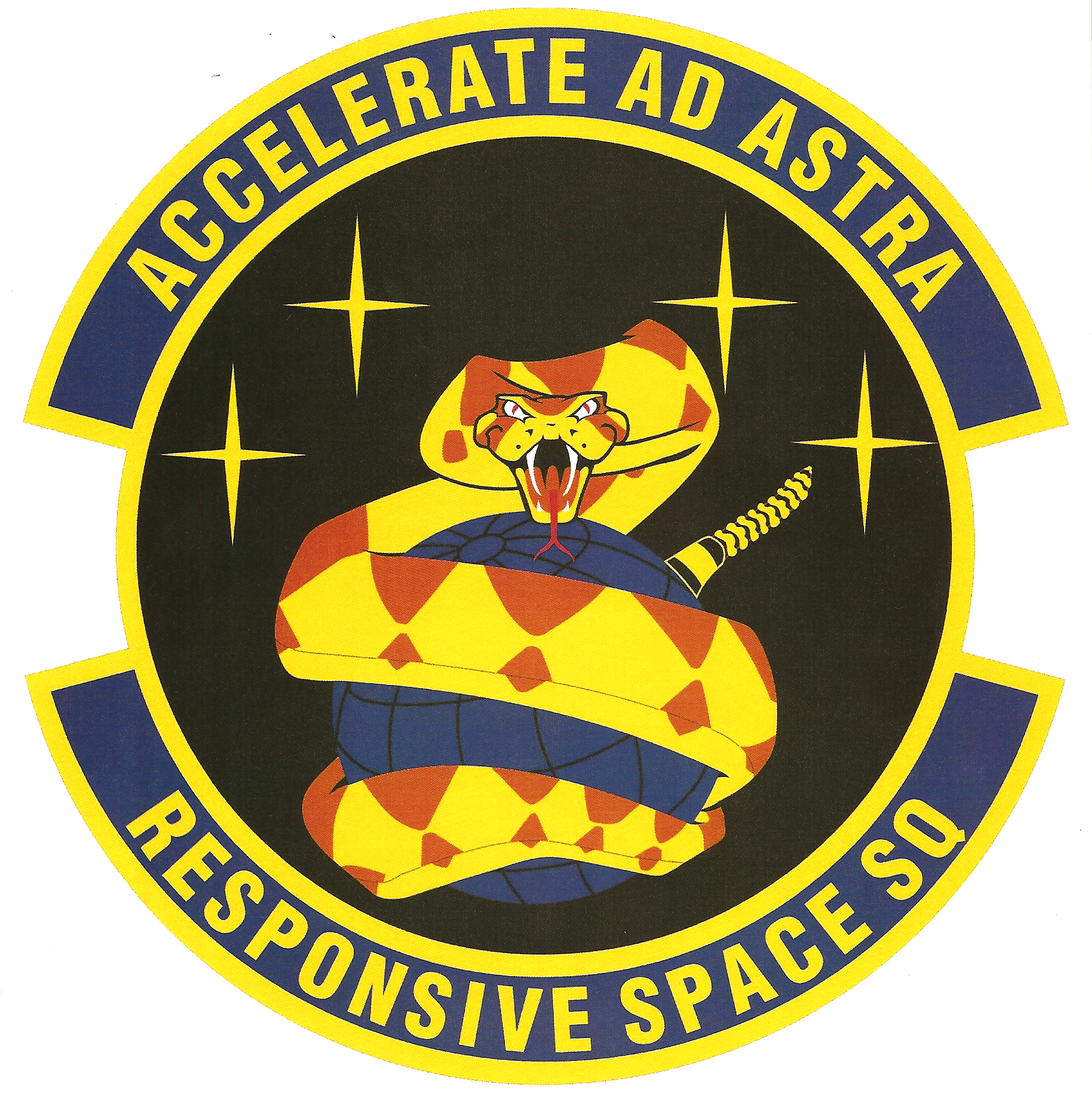
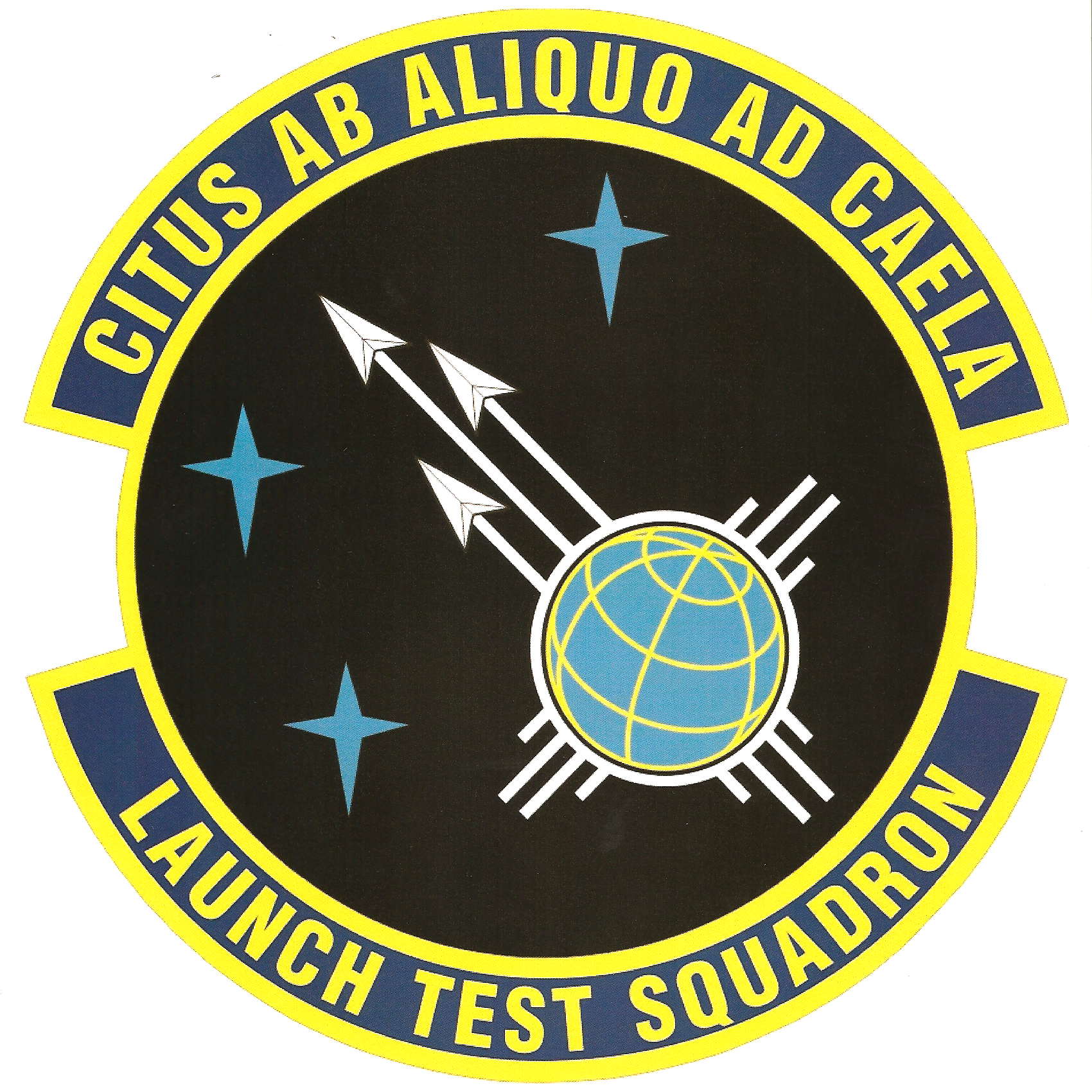
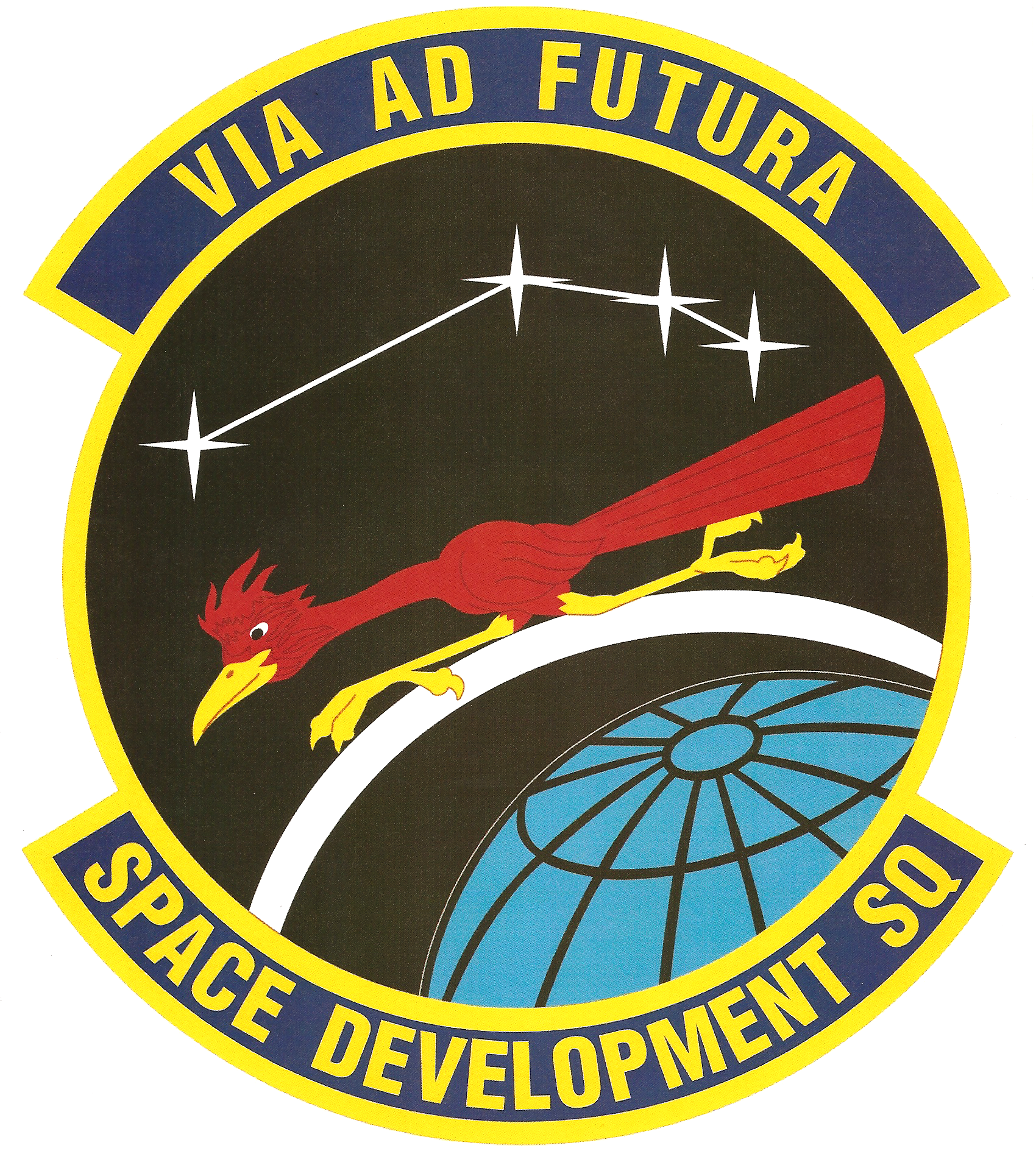
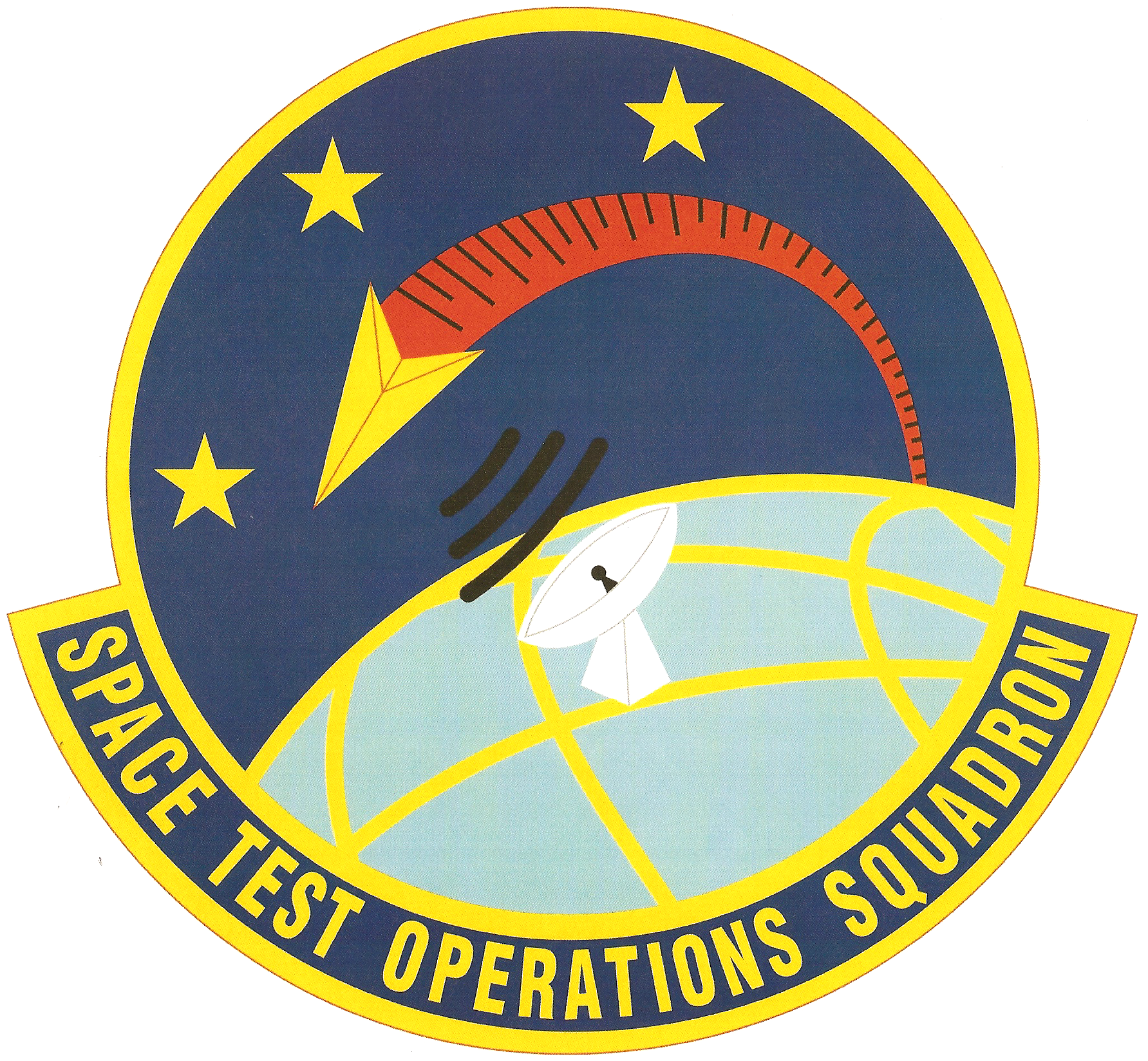
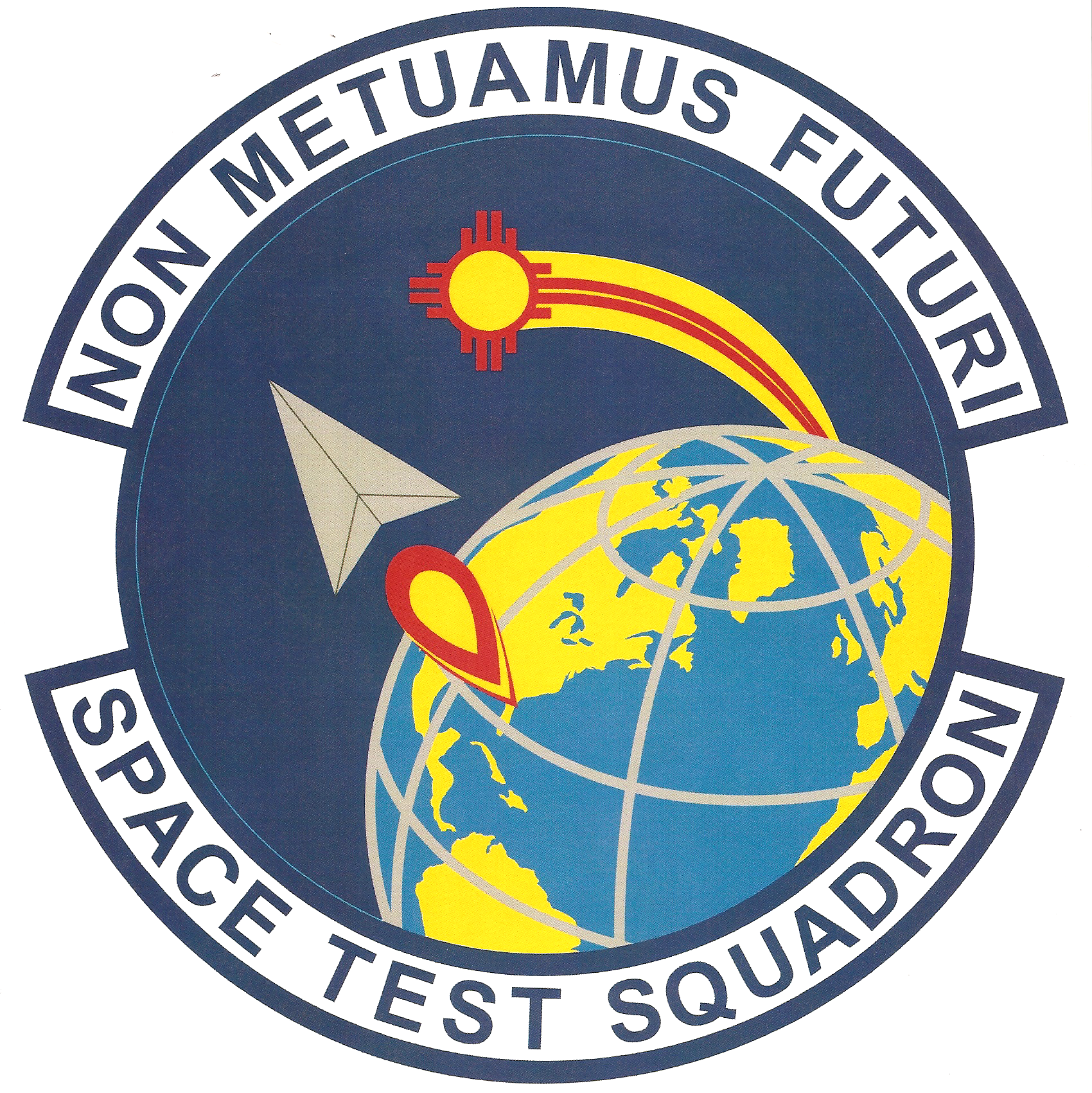
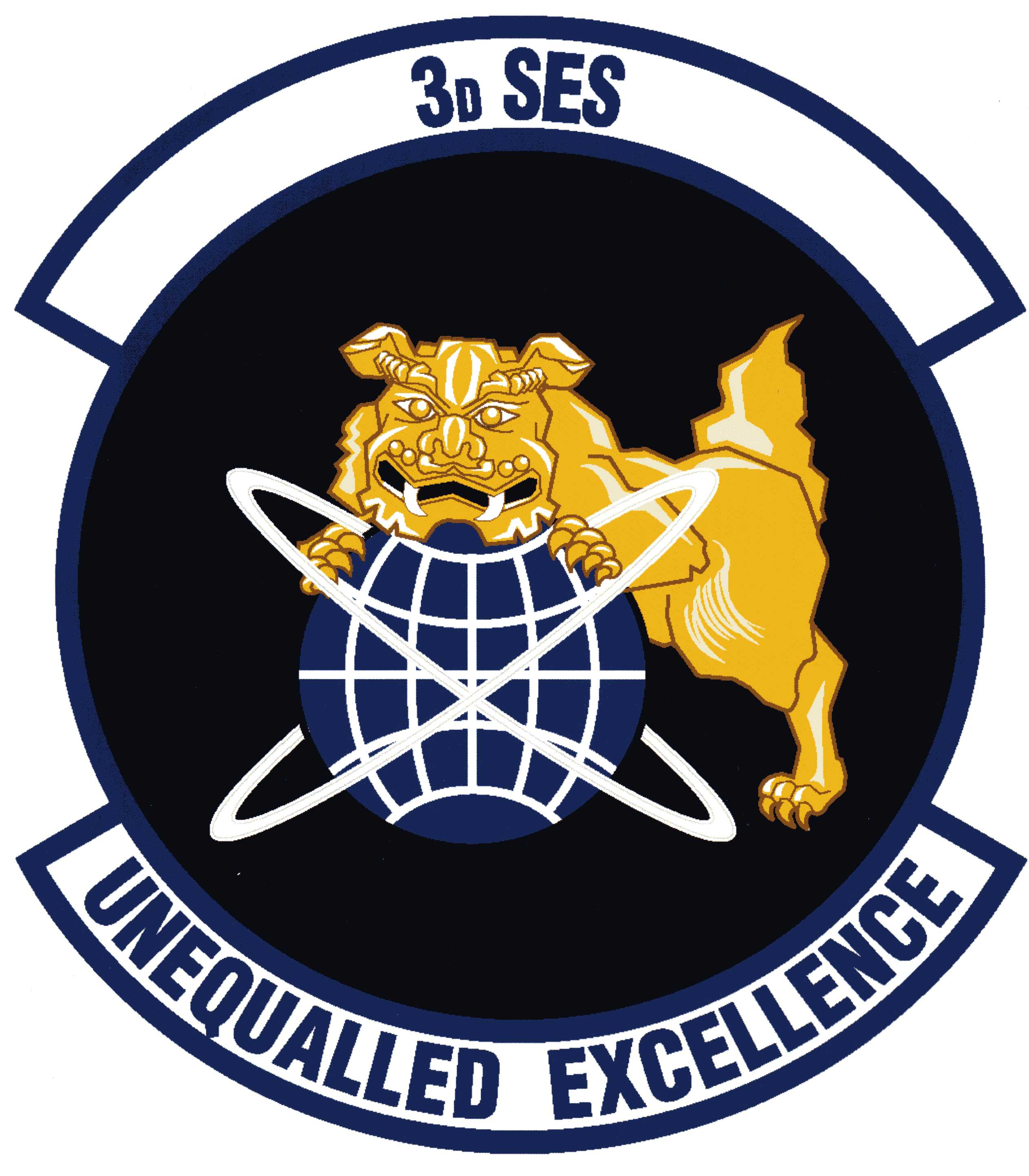
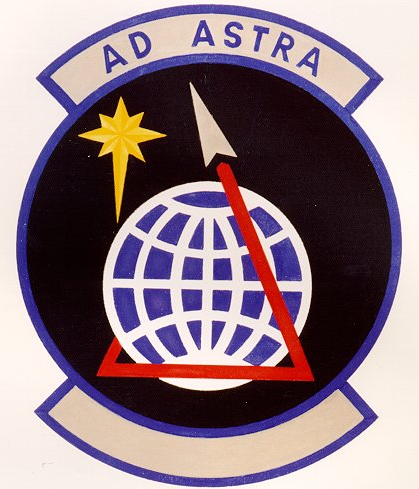
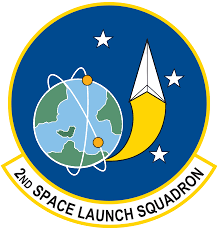
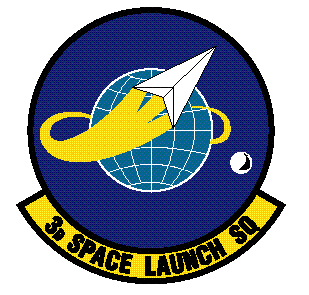
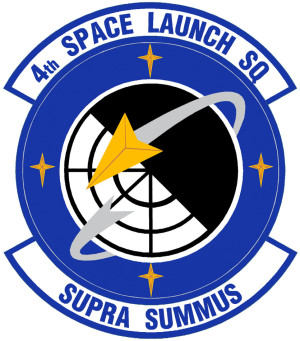
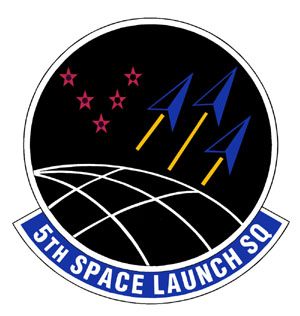
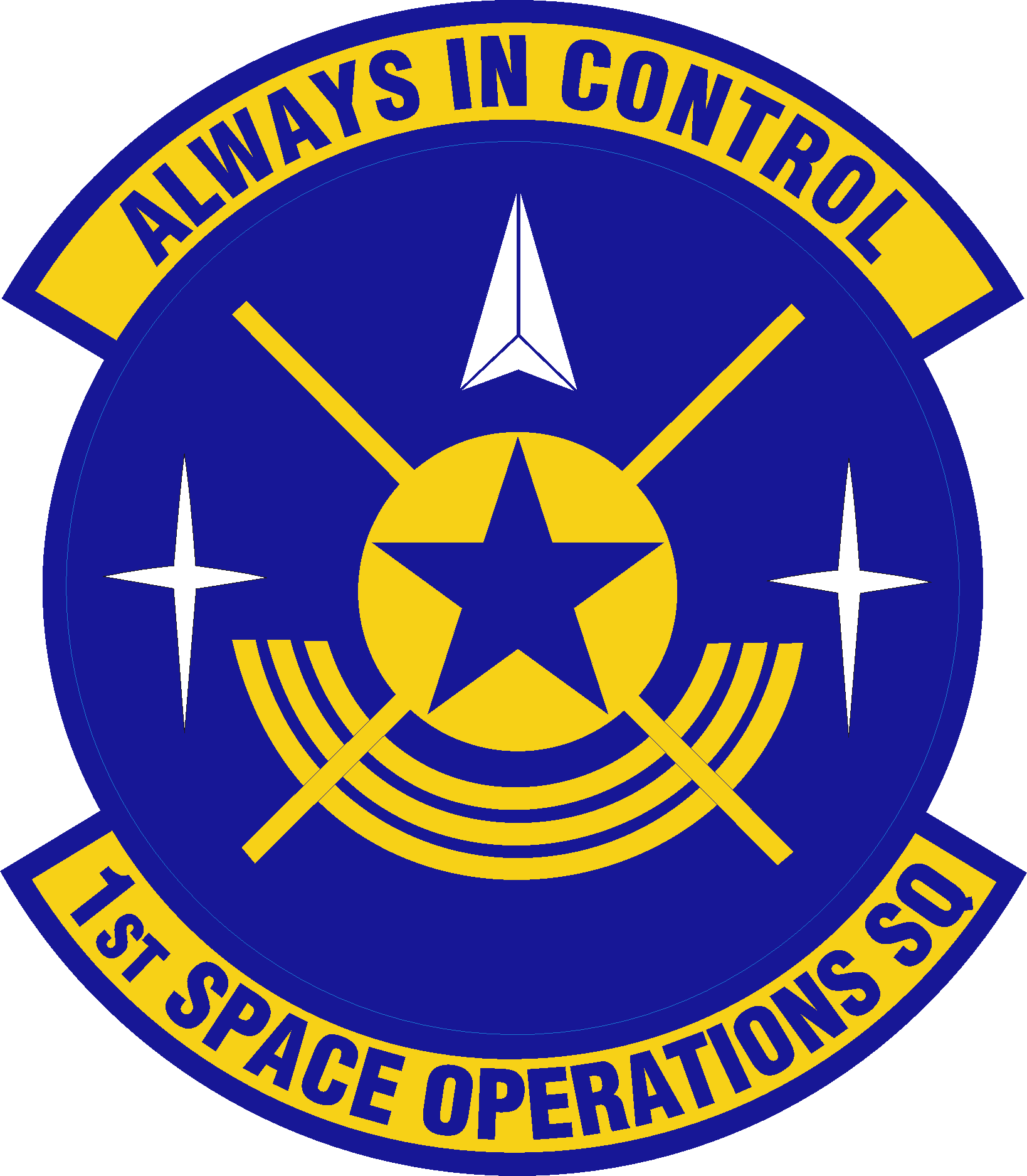
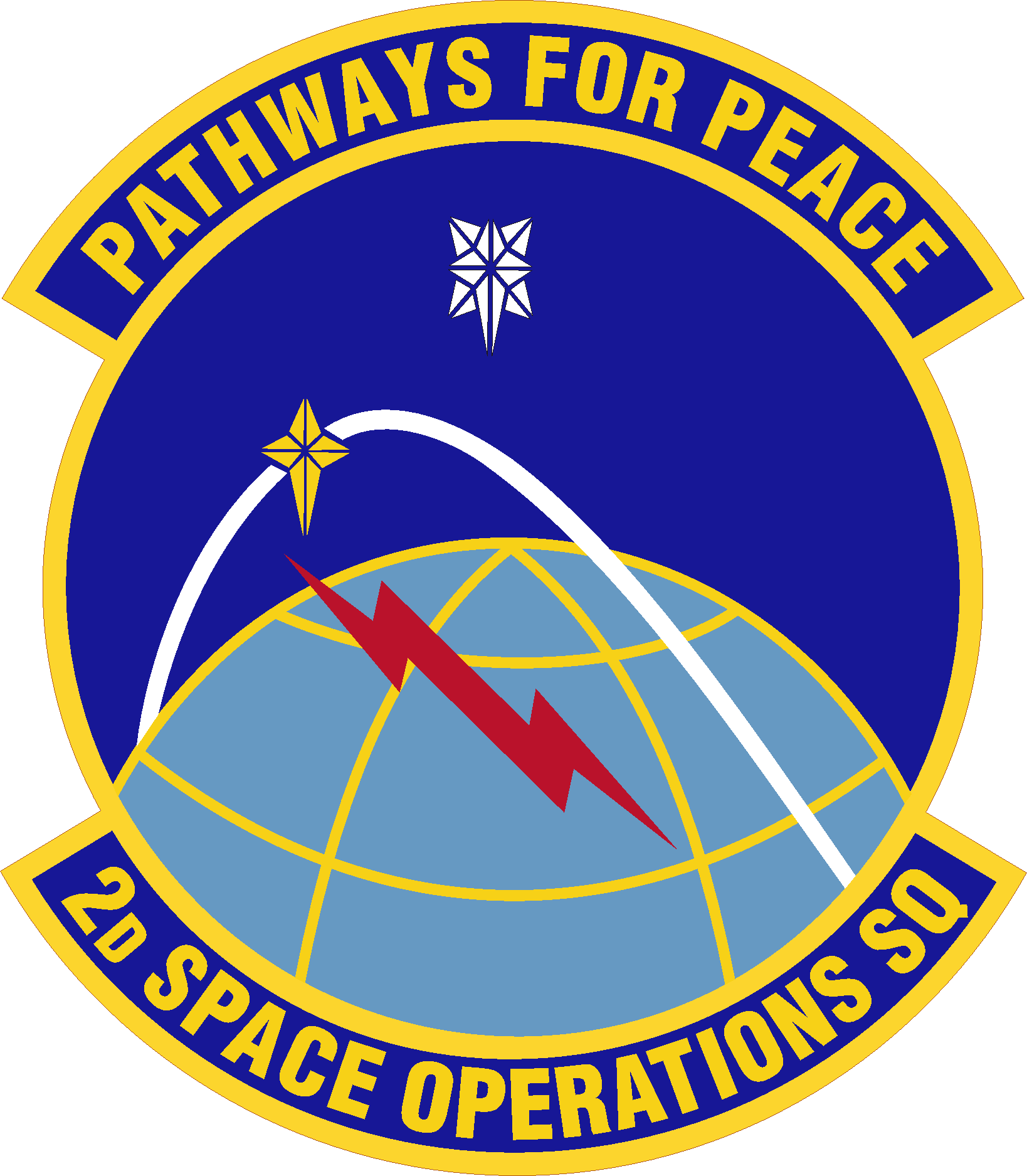
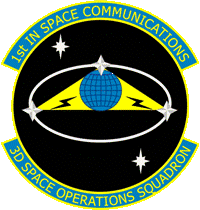
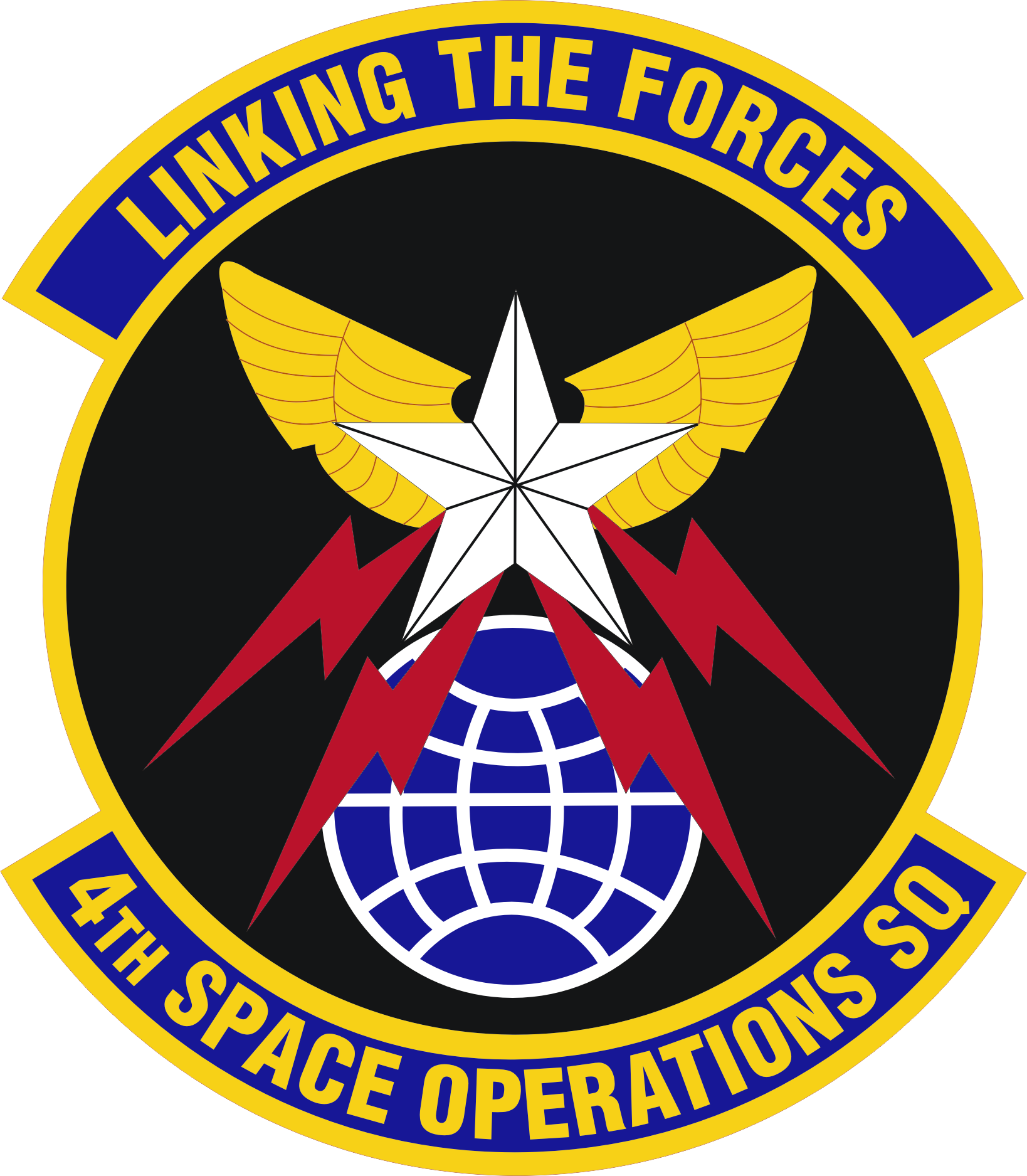
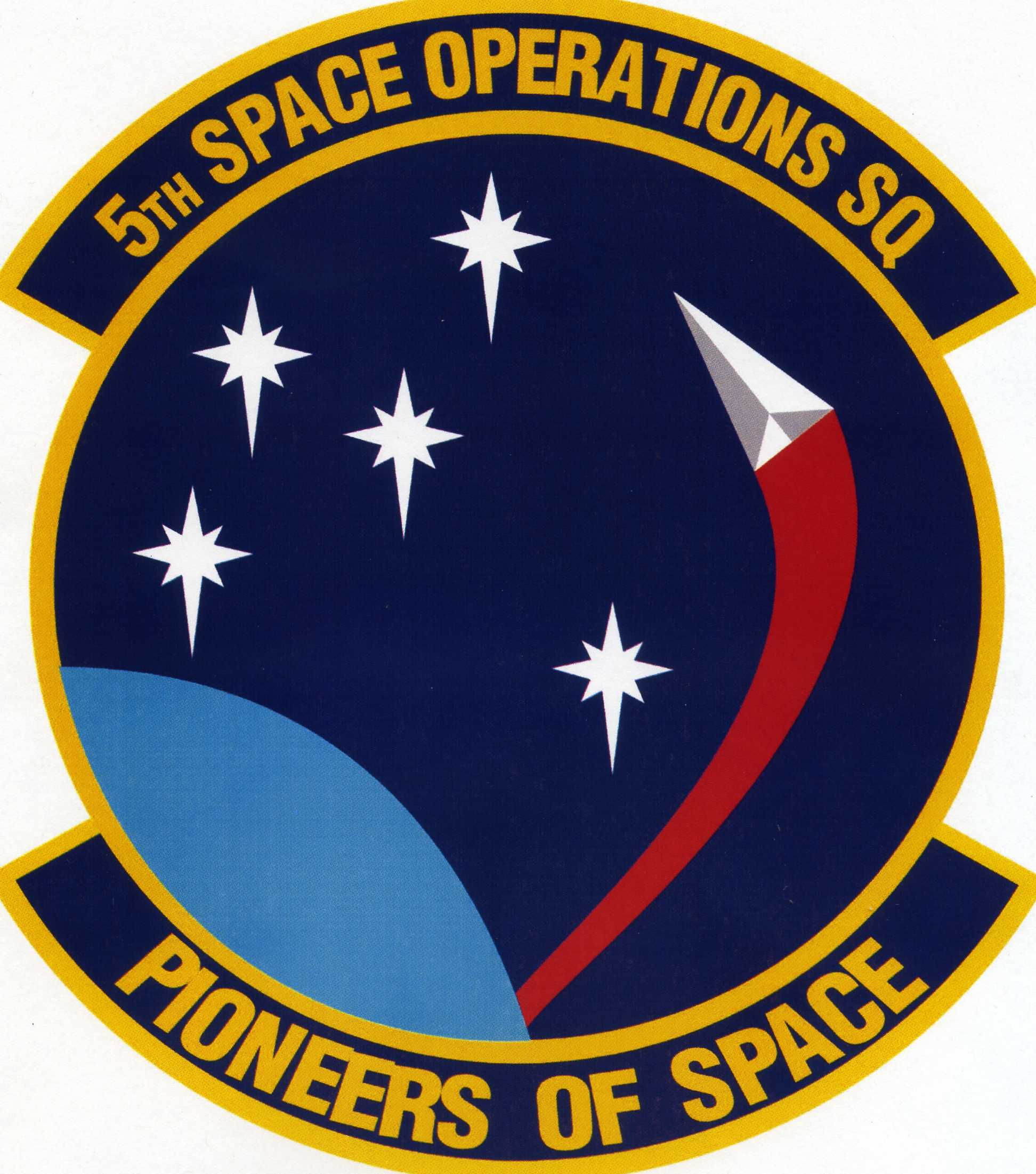
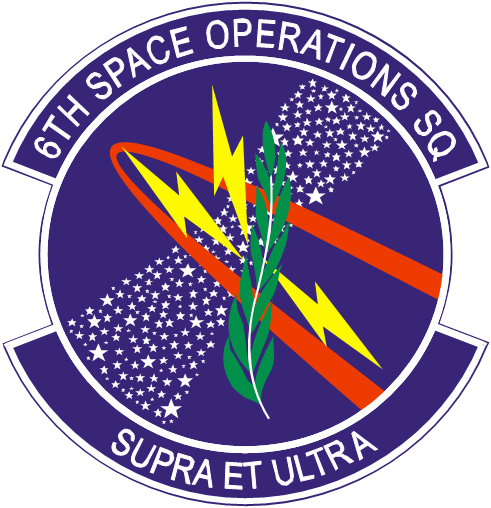
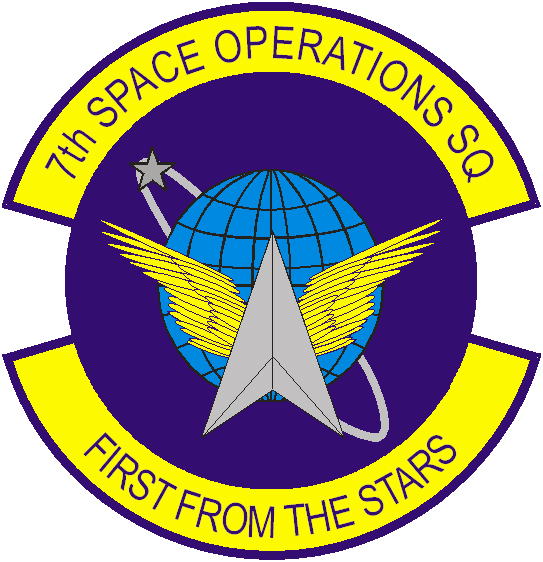
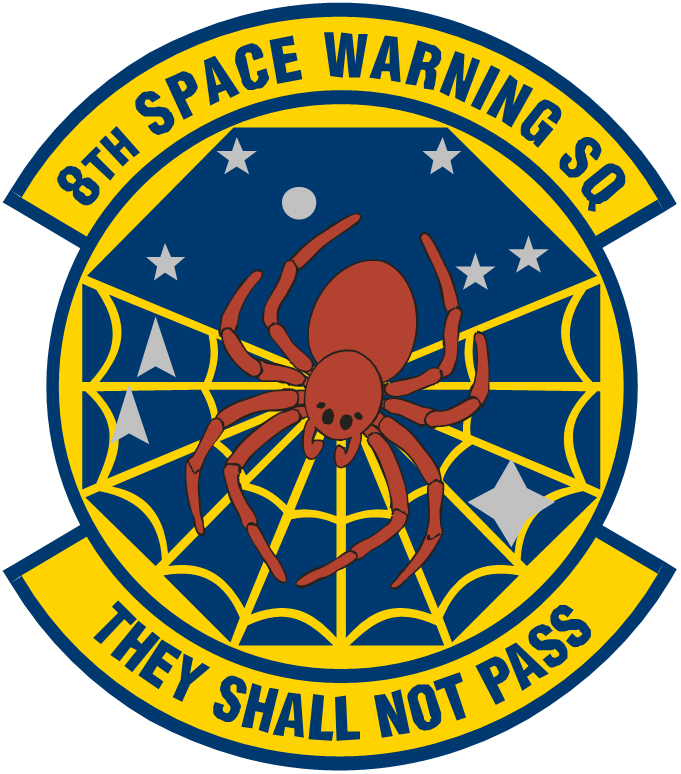
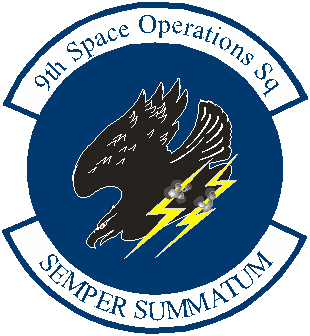
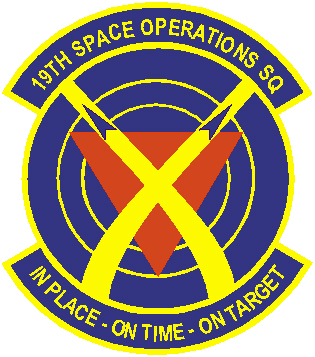
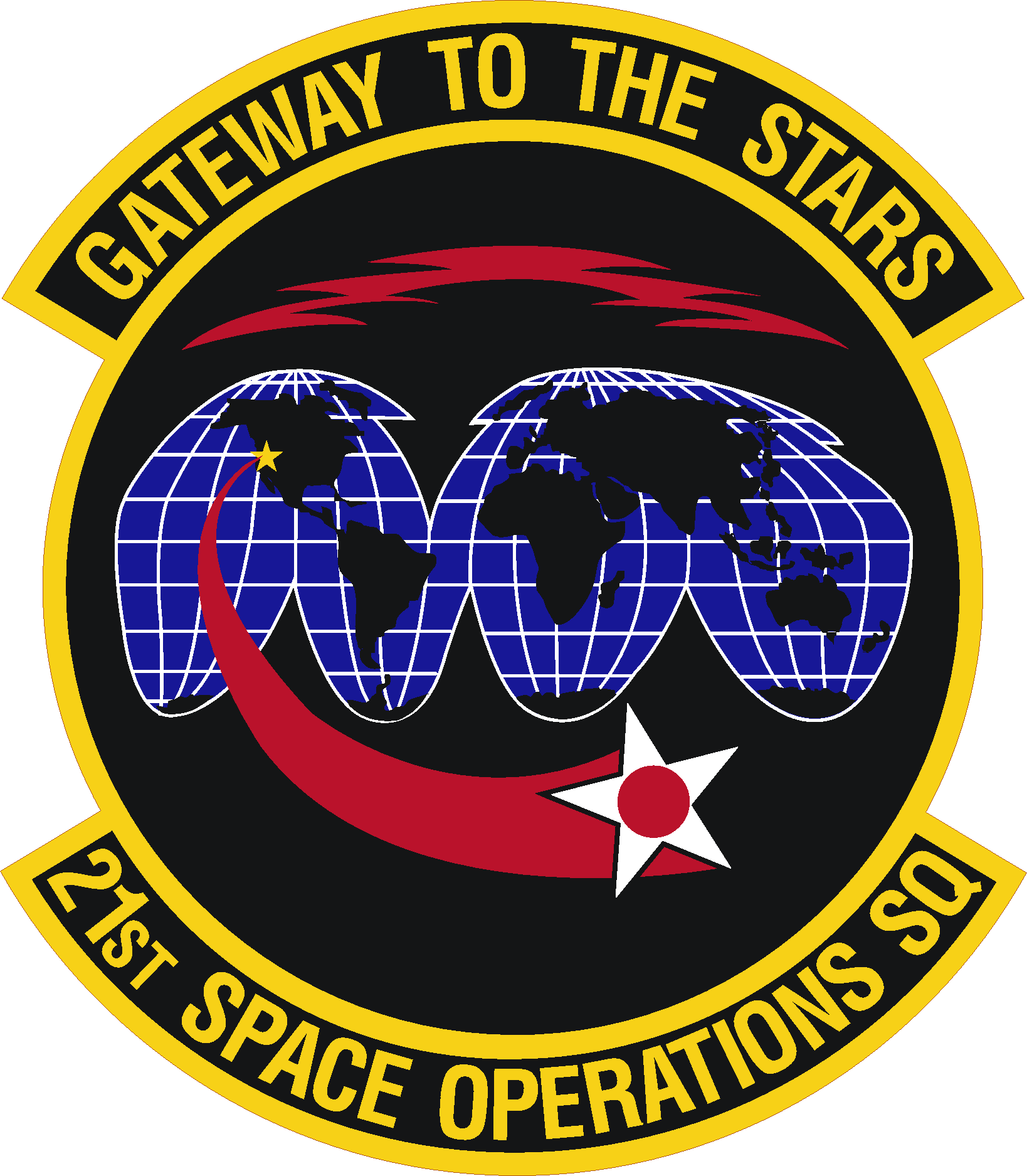
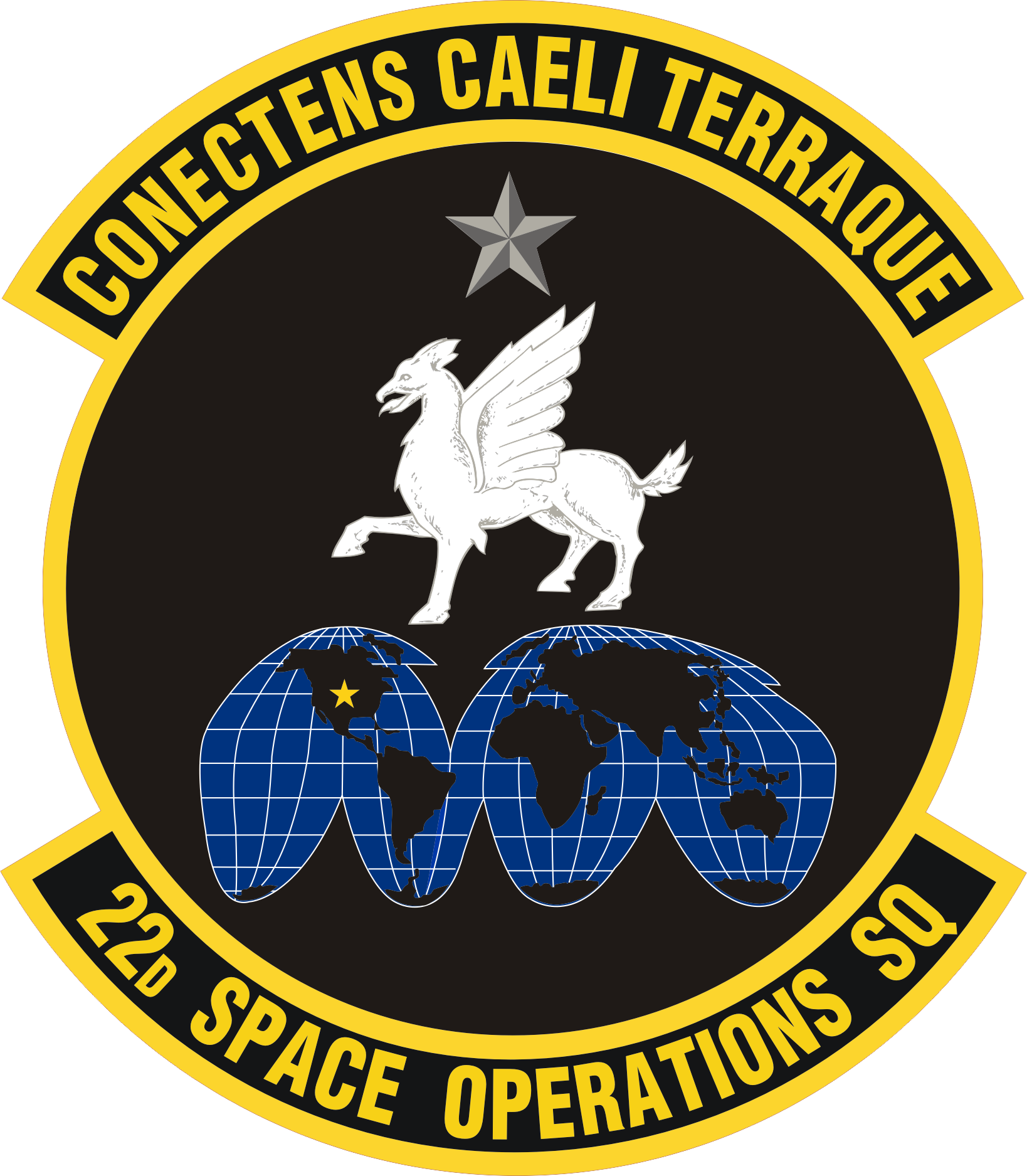
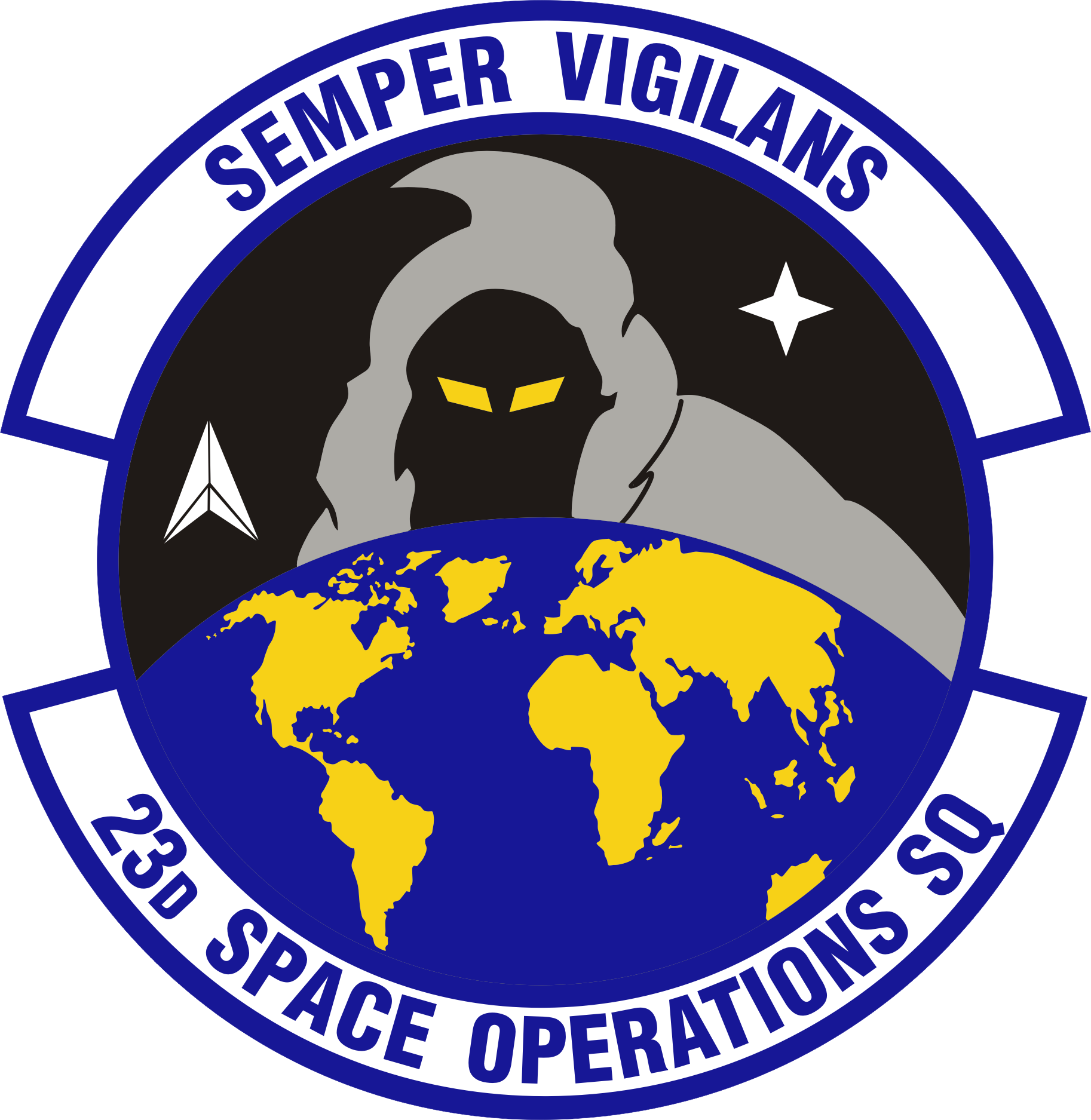
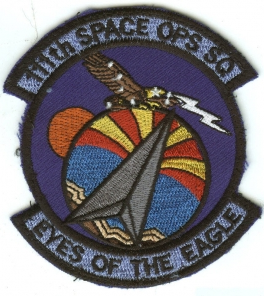
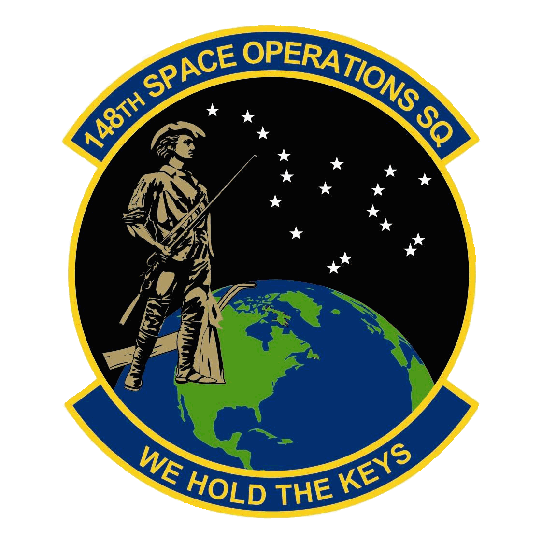
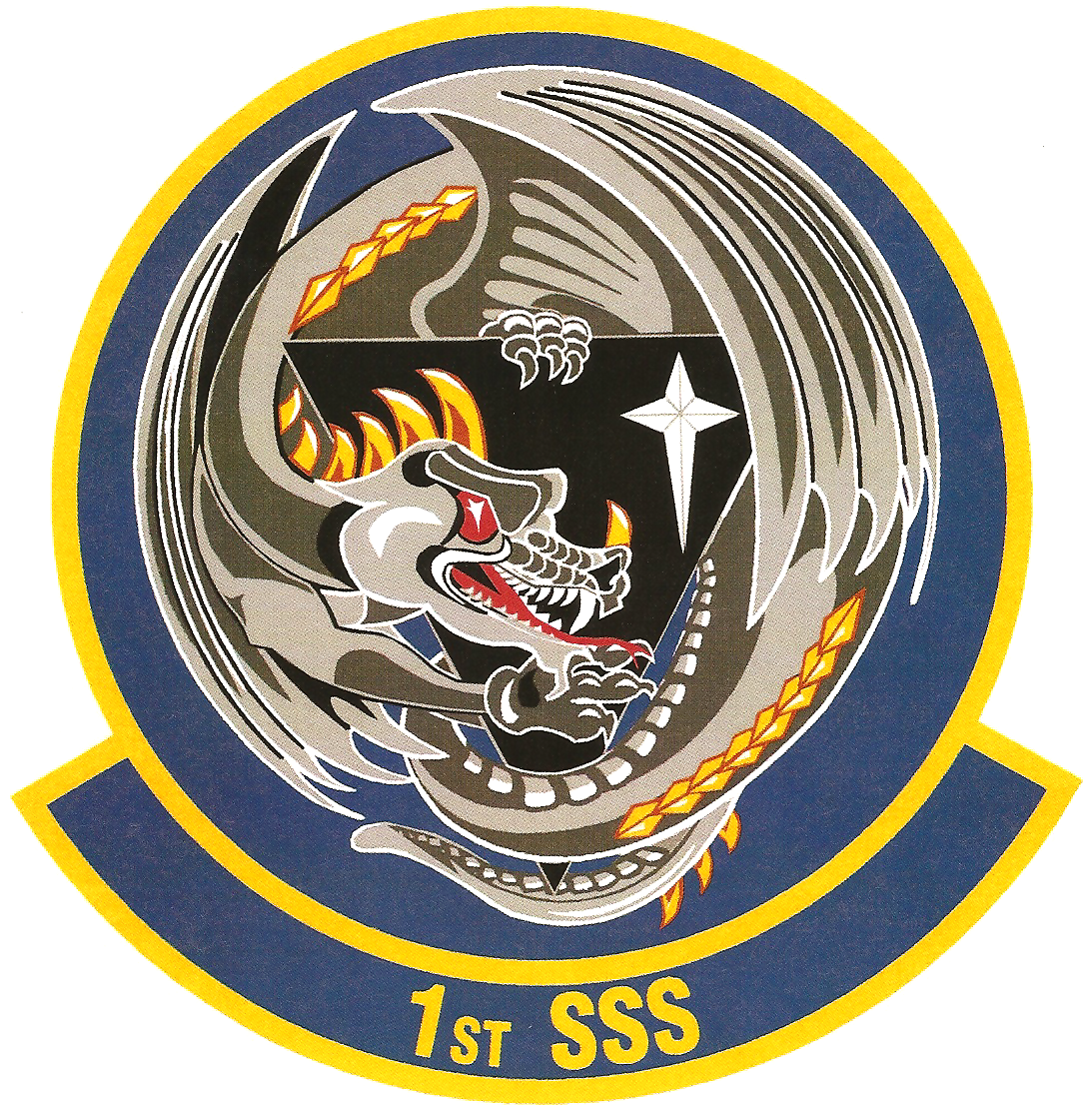
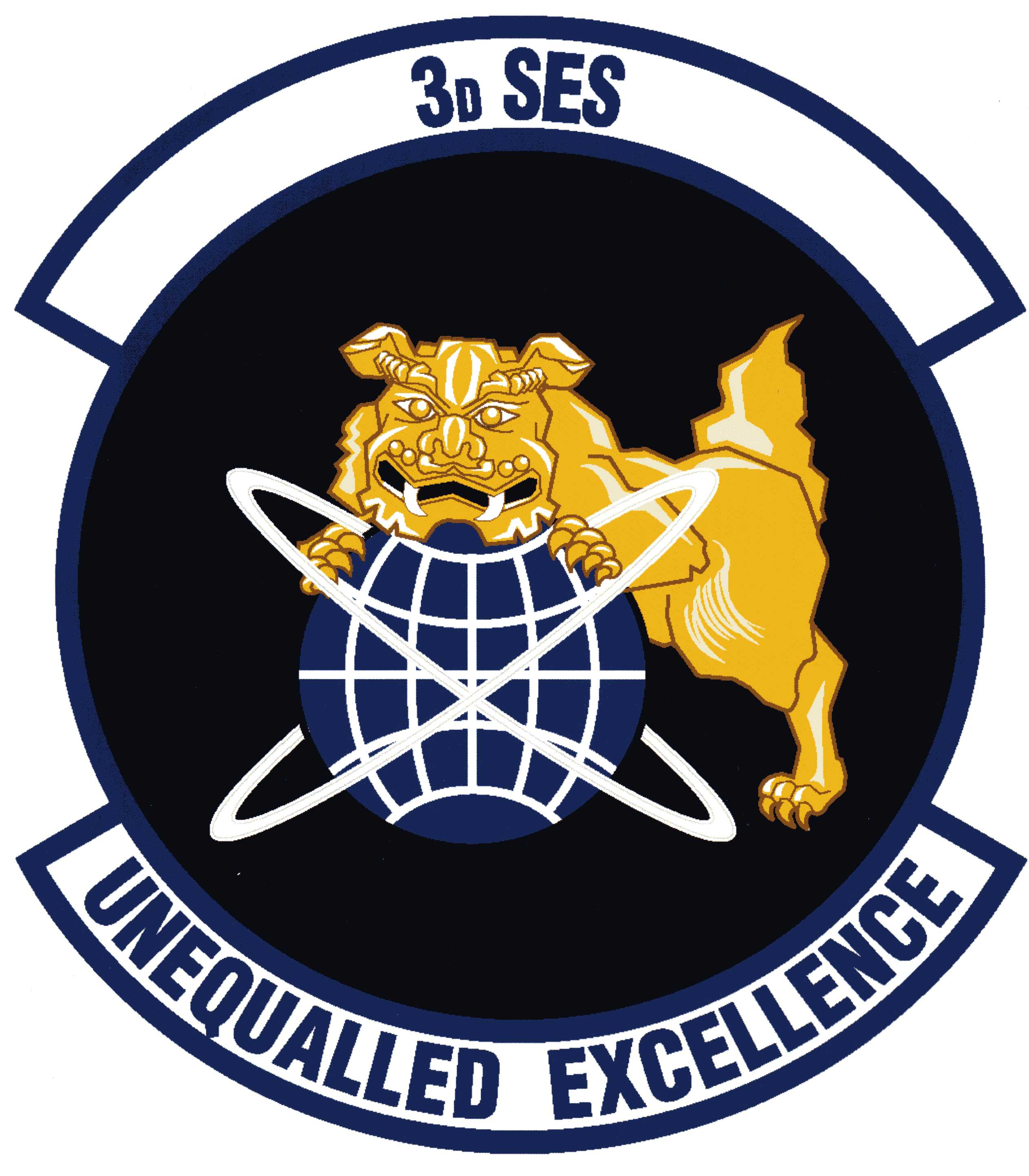
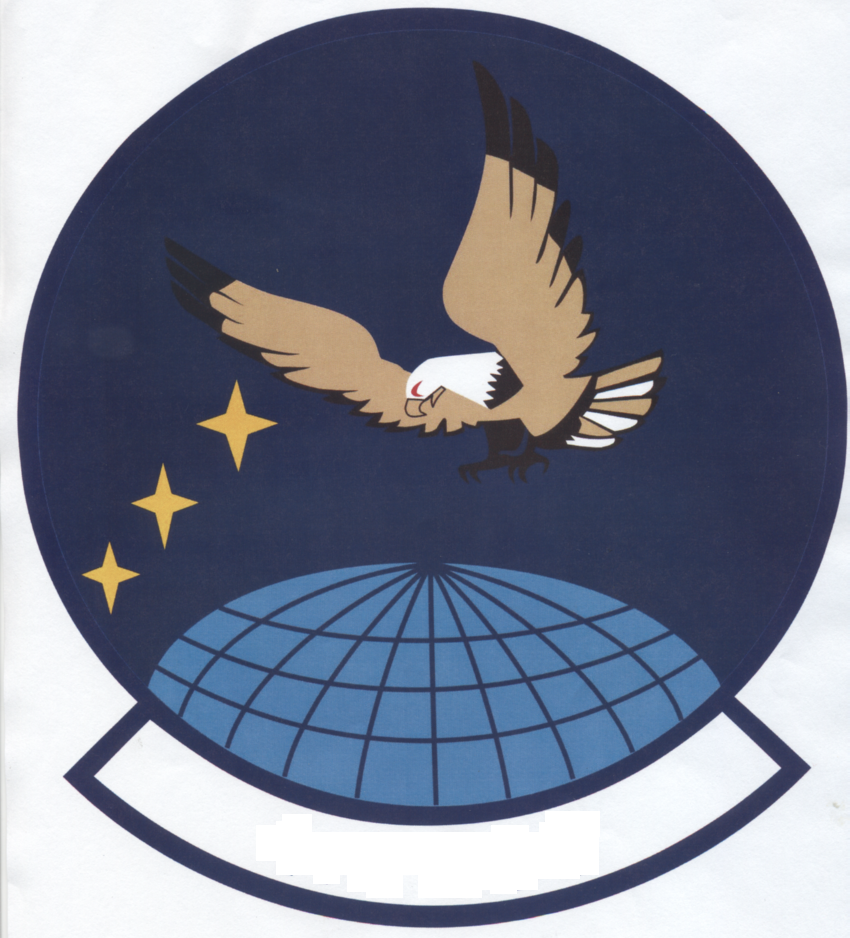
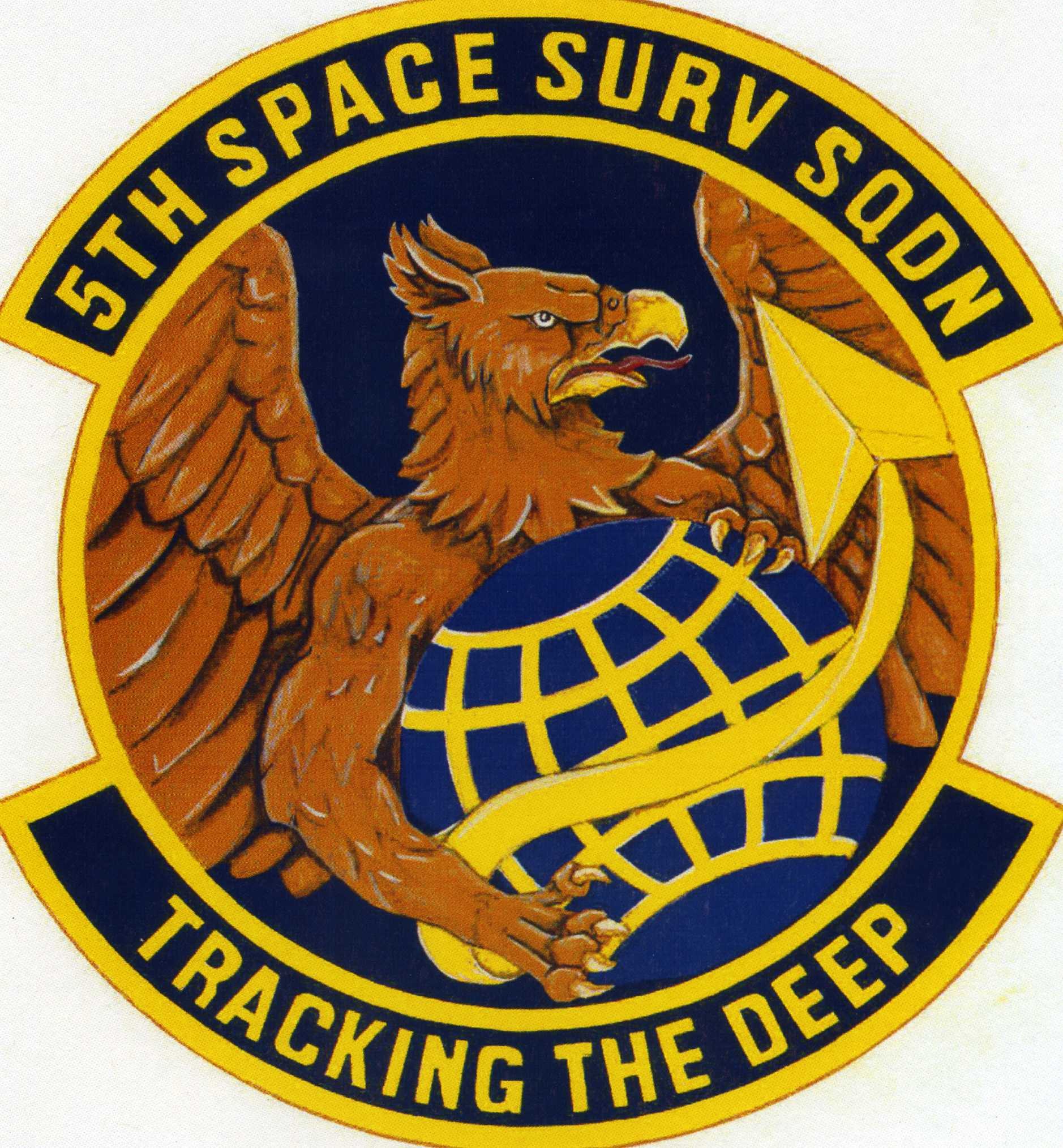
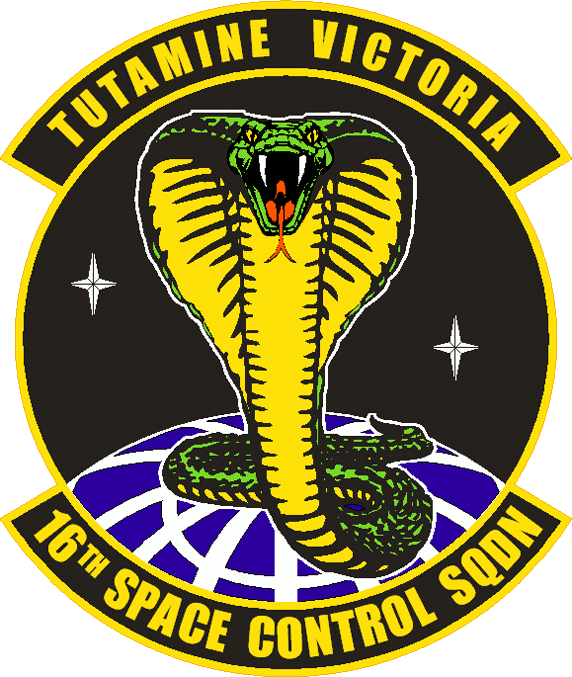
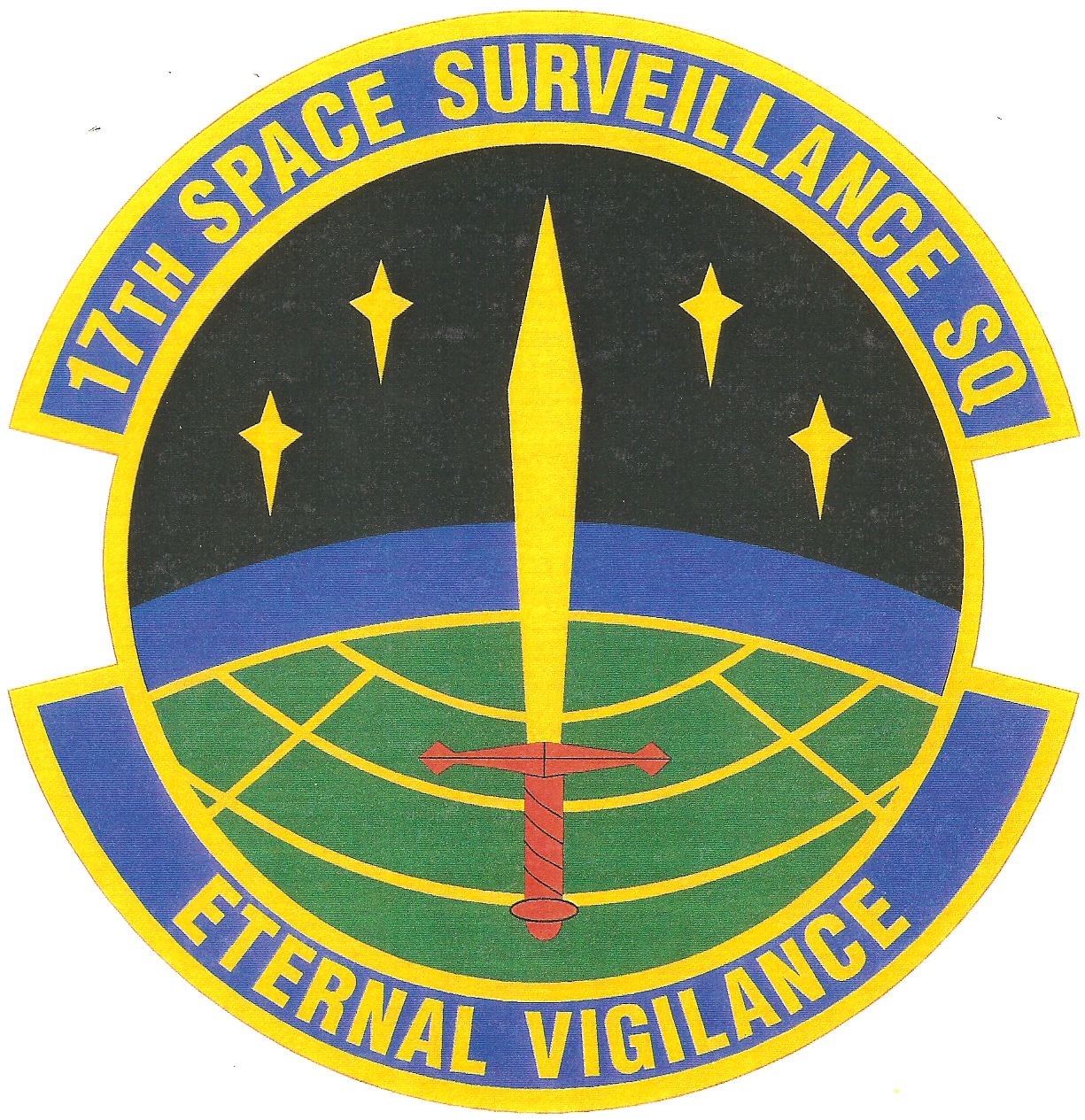
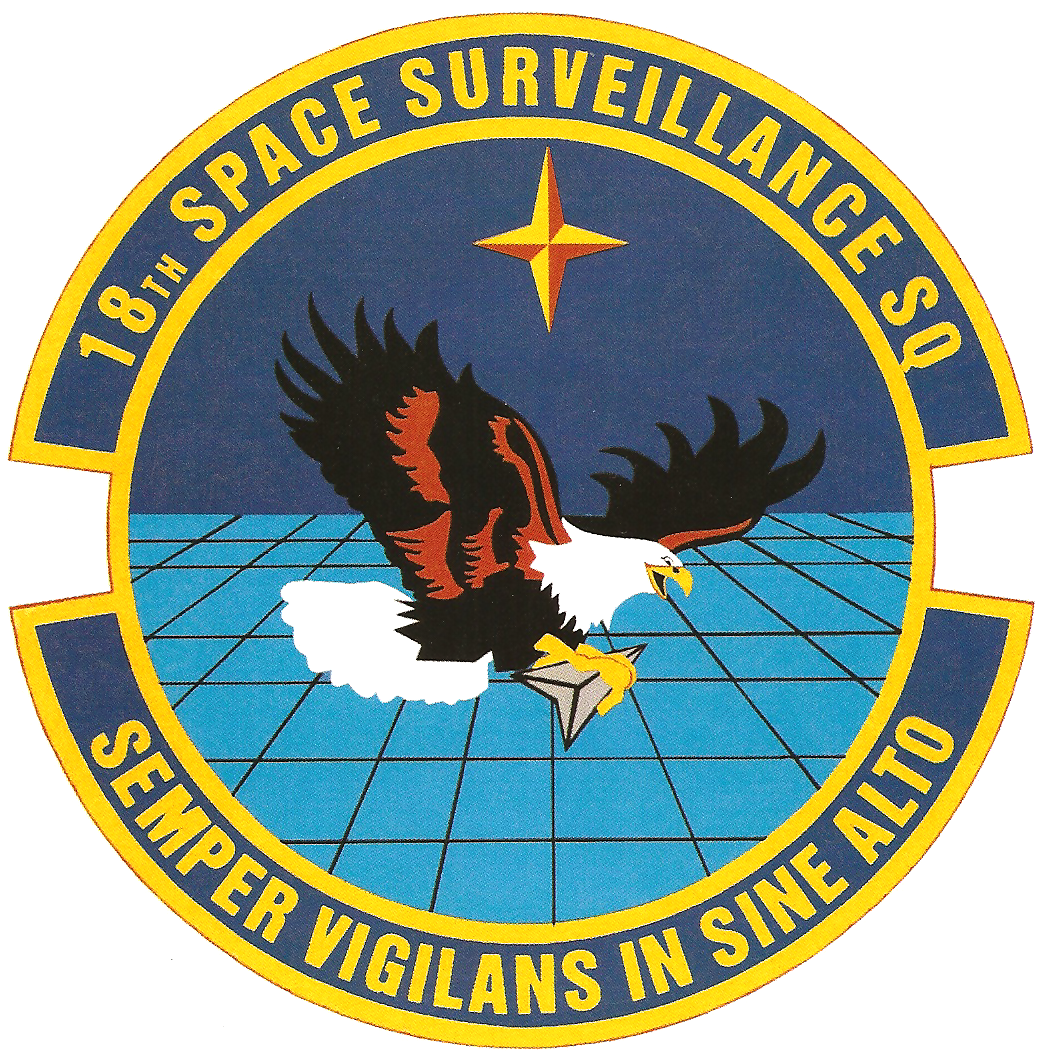
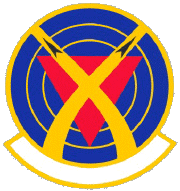
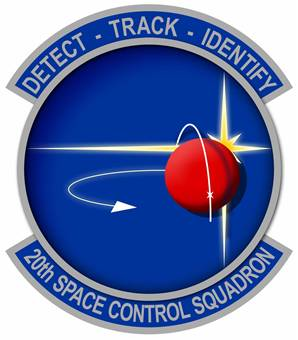
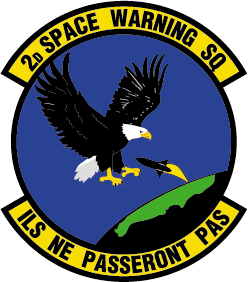
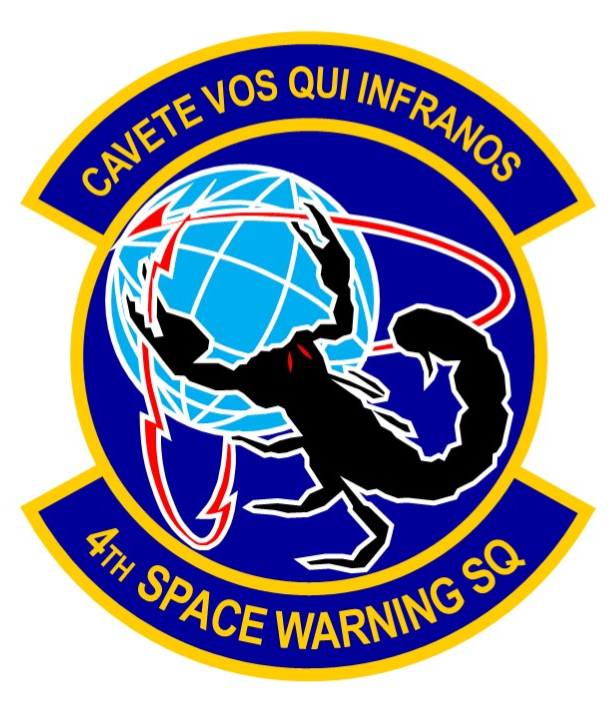
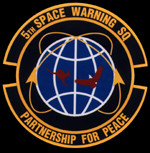
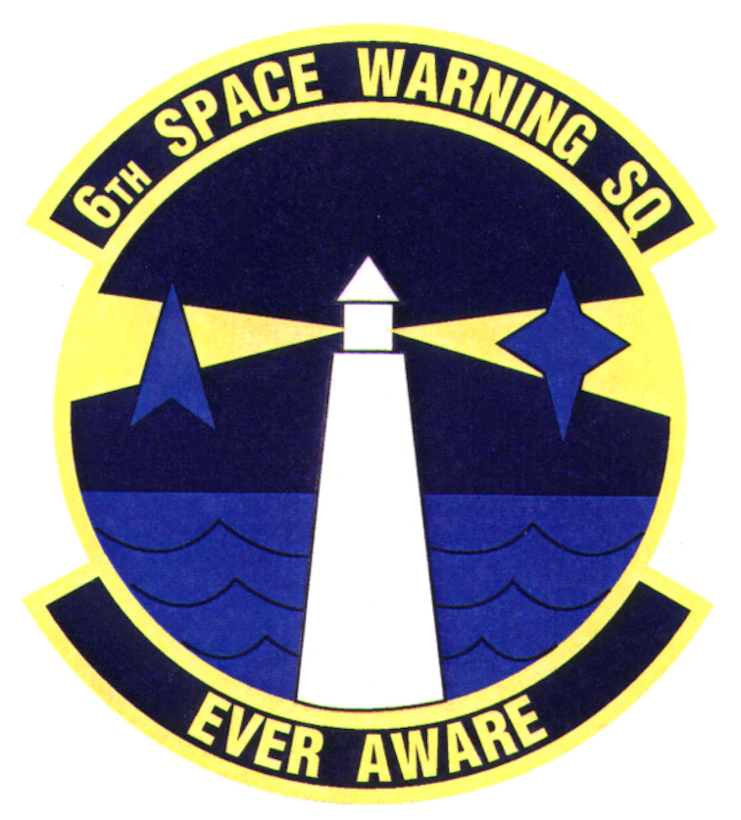
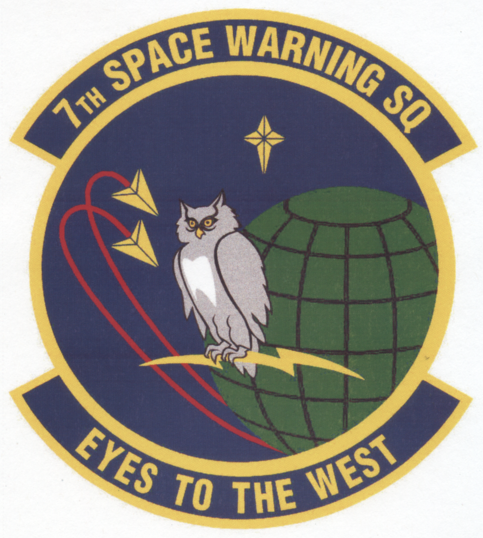
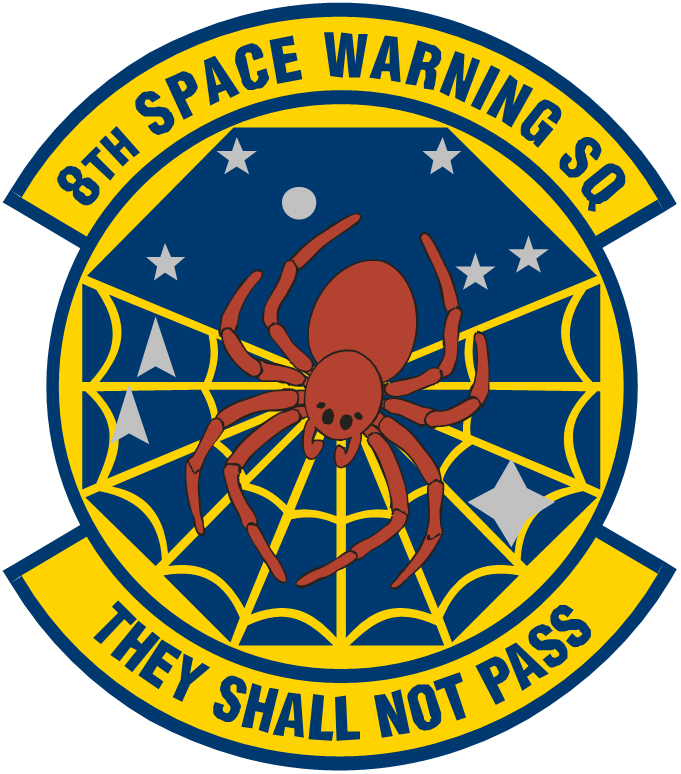
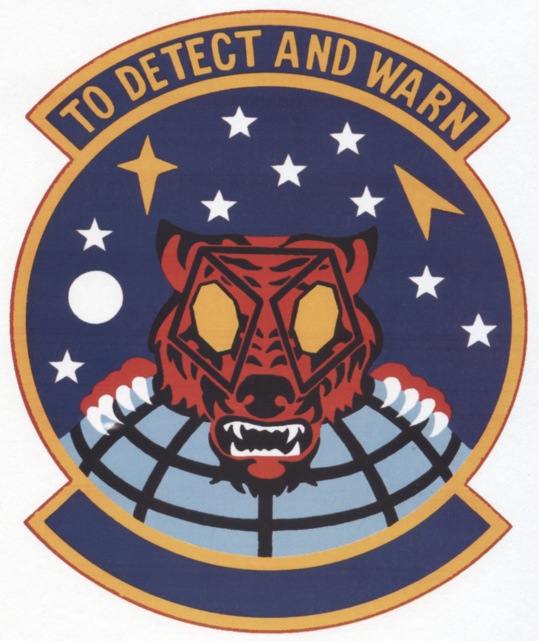
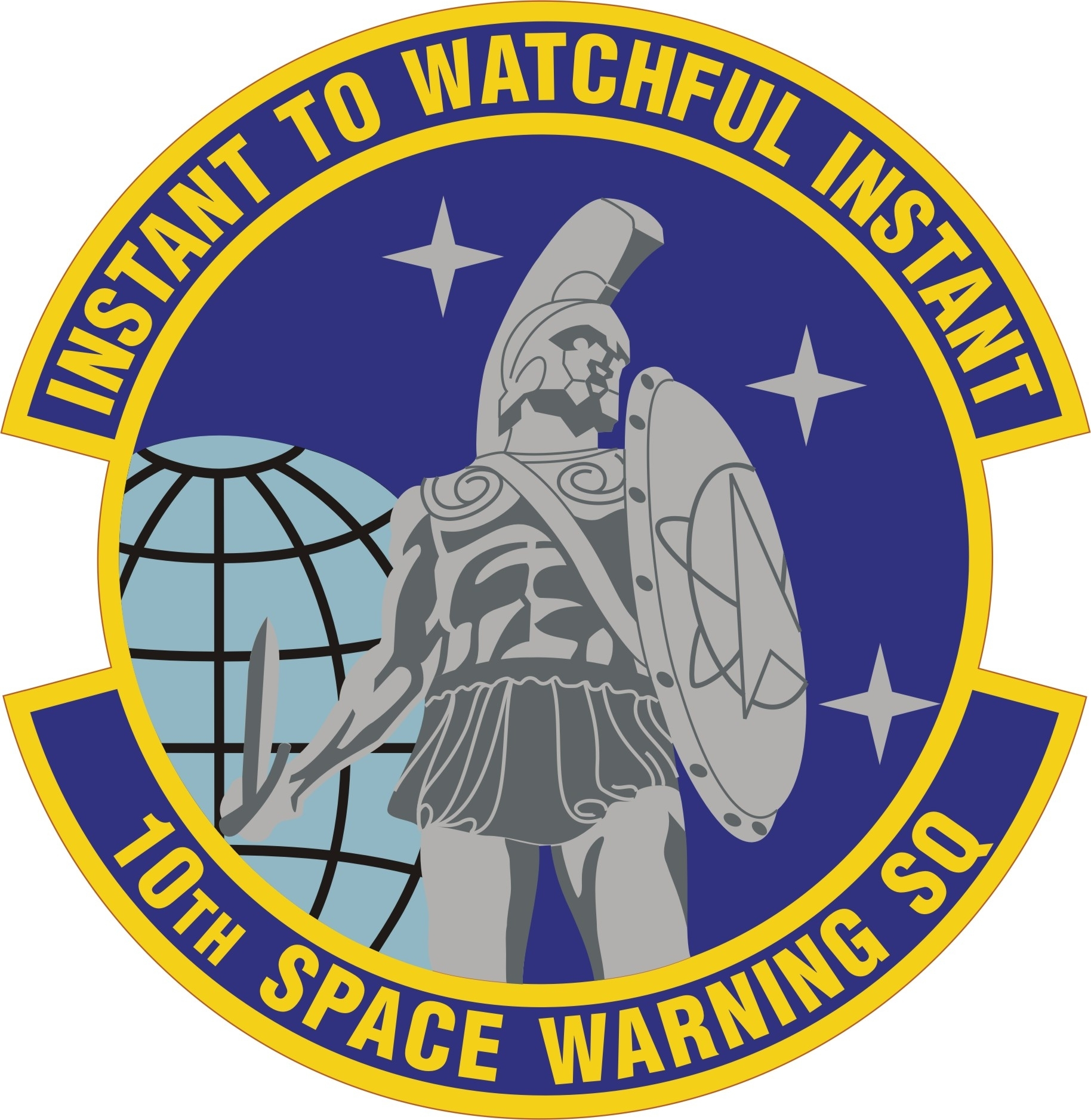
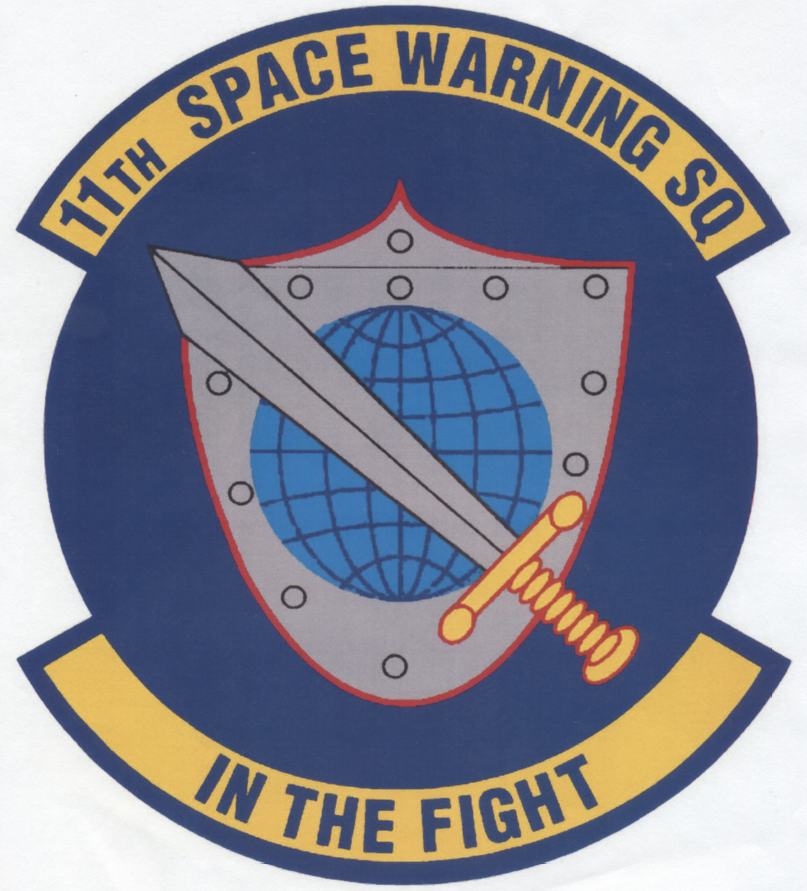
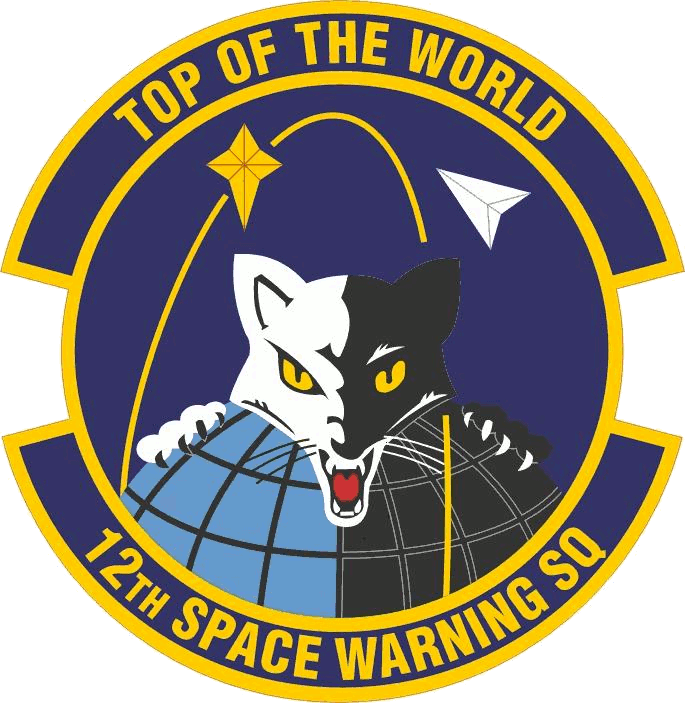
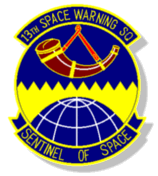
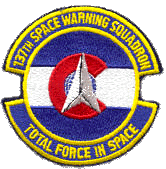
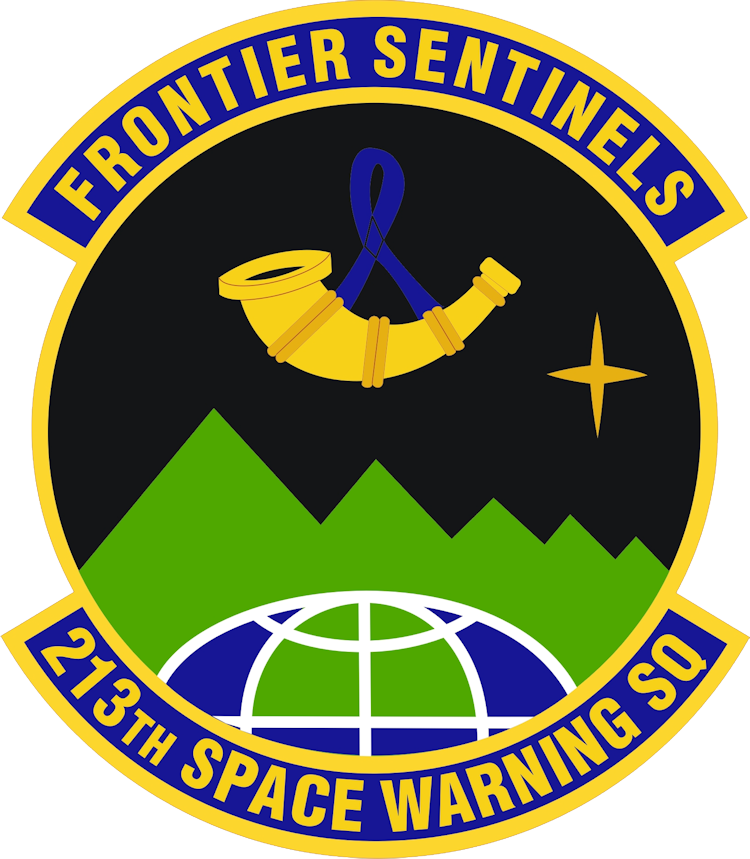
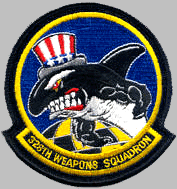
Squadron	Shield	Location	Nickname	System	Note
1st Space Control Squadron		Vandenberg AFB		Satellite Catalog
4th Space Control Squadron		Holloman AFB	"Space Pirates"	Counter Communications System
16th Space Control Squadron		Peterson AFB		RAIDRS
20th Space Control Squadron		Eglin AFB		AN/FPS-85 Phased-array radar
25th Space Range Squadron		Schriever AFB	"Executioners"	Space Test & Training Range
76th Space Control Squadron		Peterson AFB	"Lobos"	Counter Communications System
216th Space Control Squadron		Vandenberg SFB		Defensive space control and space situational awareness
380th Space Control Squadron		Peterson AFB	"Blue Squadron"	RAIDRS	Reserve Unit
Space Test and Development Squadrons
Squadron	Shield	Location	Nickname	System	Note
1st Air and Space Test Squadron		Vandenberg AFB
14th Test Squadron		Peterson AFB
17th Test Squadron		Peterson AFB
Responsive Space Squadron		Kirtland AFB		Operationally Responsive Space systems	Activated 2 Jun 2008
Launch Test Squadron		Kirtland AFB
Launch and Operations Support Squadron		Kirtland AFB			Activated 1 Aug 2006, inactivated 31 Mar 2008
Space Development Squadron		Kirtland AFB			Activated 2 Jun 2008
Space Test Operations Squadron		Kirtland AFB		C2/TT&C	Activated 2 Jun 2008
Space Test Squadron		Kirtland AFB
Space Experimentation Squadrons
Squadron	Shield	Location	Nickname	System	Note
3d Space Experimentation Squadron		Schriever AFB
Space Launch Squadrons
Squadron	Shield	Location	Nickname	System	Note
1st Space Launch Squadron		Cape Canaveral AFS		Delta II	Inactivated 2009
2d Space Launch Squadron		Vandenberg AFB		Atlas III/Titan IV	1990-2005, 2019–present
3d Space Launch Squadron		Cape Canaveral AFS		Atlas III/Titan IV	Inactivated 2005
4th Space Launch Squadron		Vandenberg AFB		EELV
5th Space Launch Squadron		Cape Canaveral AFS		EELV
Space Operations Squadrons
Squadron	Shield	Location	Nickname	System	Note
1st Space Operations Squadron		Schriever AFB		On-orbit C2 for DSP/GPS/MSX/ACE	Future C2 of Space Based Surveillance System
2d Space Operations Squadron		Schriever AFB		GPS
3d Space Operations Squadron		Schriever AFB		DSCS/WGS
4th Space Operations Squadron		Schriever AFB		Milstar
5th Space Operations Squadron		Onizuka AFS		DSCS III/NATO IV/Skynet/Inertial Upper Stage	Inactivated
6th Space Operations Squadron		Schriever AFB		DMSP	Reserve unit
7th Space Operations Squadron		Schriever AFB		On-orbit C2 for DSP/GPS/MSX	Reserve unit
8th Space Operations Squadron		Falcon AFB		DMSP	Redesignated 8th Space Warning Squadron
9th Space Operations Squadron		Vandenberg AFB		Joint Space Operations Center	Reserve unit
19th Space Operations Squadron		Schriever AFB		GPS	Reserve associate to 2 SOPS
21st Space Operations Squadron		Vandenberg Space Force Base	"Dust Devils"	AFSCN
22d Space Operations Squadron		Schriever AFB		AFSCN
23d Space Operations Squadron		New Boston AFS		AFSCN	Remote Tracking Station
111th Space Operations Squadron		Phoenix, AZ		Near-space operations	ANG unit
148th Space Operations Squadron		Vandenberg AFB		Milstar	ANG unit; associate to 4th Space Operations Squadron
Space Surveillance Squadrons
Squadron	Shield	Location	Nickname	System	Note
1st Space Surveillance Squadron		Griffiss AFB		Low Altitude Space Surveillance	Inactivated
3d Space Surveillance Squadron		Misawa AB		Deep Space Tracking System	Redesignated 3d Space Experimentation Squadron
4th Space Surveillance Squadron		Holloman AFB		Deep Space Tracking System	Renamed 4th Space Control Squadron
5th Space Surveillance Squadron		RAF Feltwell		Deep Space Tracking System	Redesignated Det 4, 18th Intelligence Squadron
16th Space Surveillance Squadron		Shemya AFS		AN/FPS-108 COBRA DANE	Renamed 16th Space Control Squadron
17th Space Surveillance Squadron		RAF Edzell	"Eternal Vigilance"	Low Altitude Space Surveillance	Inactivated
18th Space Surveillance Squadron		Edwards AFB		GEODSS	Inactivated
19th Space Surveillance Squadron		Pirinclik, Turkey		AN/FPS-17 radar	Inactivated
20th Space Surveillance Squadron		Eglin AFB		AN/FPS-85 radar	Renamed 20th Space Control Squadron
Space Weather Squadrons
Squadron	Shield	Location	Nickname	System	Note
55th Space Weather Squadron		Schriever AFB			Inactivated
Space Warning Squadrons
Squadron	Shield	Location	Nickname	System	Note
2d Space Warning Squadron		Buckley Space Force Base		SBIRS/DSP
4th Space Warning Squadron		Buckley Space Force Base	"Scorpions"	SBIRS/DSP
5th Space Warning Squadron		Woomera AS		DSP	Inactivated
6th Space Warning Squadron		Cape Cod Space Force Station	"Ever Aware"	PAVE PAWS
7th Space Warning Squadron		Beale AFB		PAVE PAWS
8th Space Warning Squadron		Buckley Space Force Base	"Spiders"	SBIRS/DSP	Previously at Eldorado AS with PAVE PAWS
9th Space Warning Squadron		Robins AFB		PAVE PAWS	Inactivated
10th Space Warning Squadron		Cavalier AFS		AN/FPQ-16 PARCS
11th Space Warning Squadron		Buckley Space Force Base		OBAC
12th Space Warning Squadron		Thule AB		PAVE PAWS	Previously used AN/FPS-50 BMEWS
13th Space Warning Squadron		Clear AFS		PAVE PAWS	Previously used AN/FPS-50 BMEWS
137th Space Warning Squadron		Greeley ANGB		SBIRS/DSP	Air National Guard unit
213th Space Warning Squadron		Clear AFS		PAVE PAWS	ANG Counterpart to 13SWS
Weapons Squadrons (Space & ICBM)
Squadron	Shield	Location	Nickname	System	Note
328th Weapons Squadron		Nellis AFB		Various	Teaches space-related curriculum at USAF Weapons School

== See also ==
- List of United States Air Force squadrons
