= 213th Space Warning Squadron =

Unit of the Alaska Air National Guard

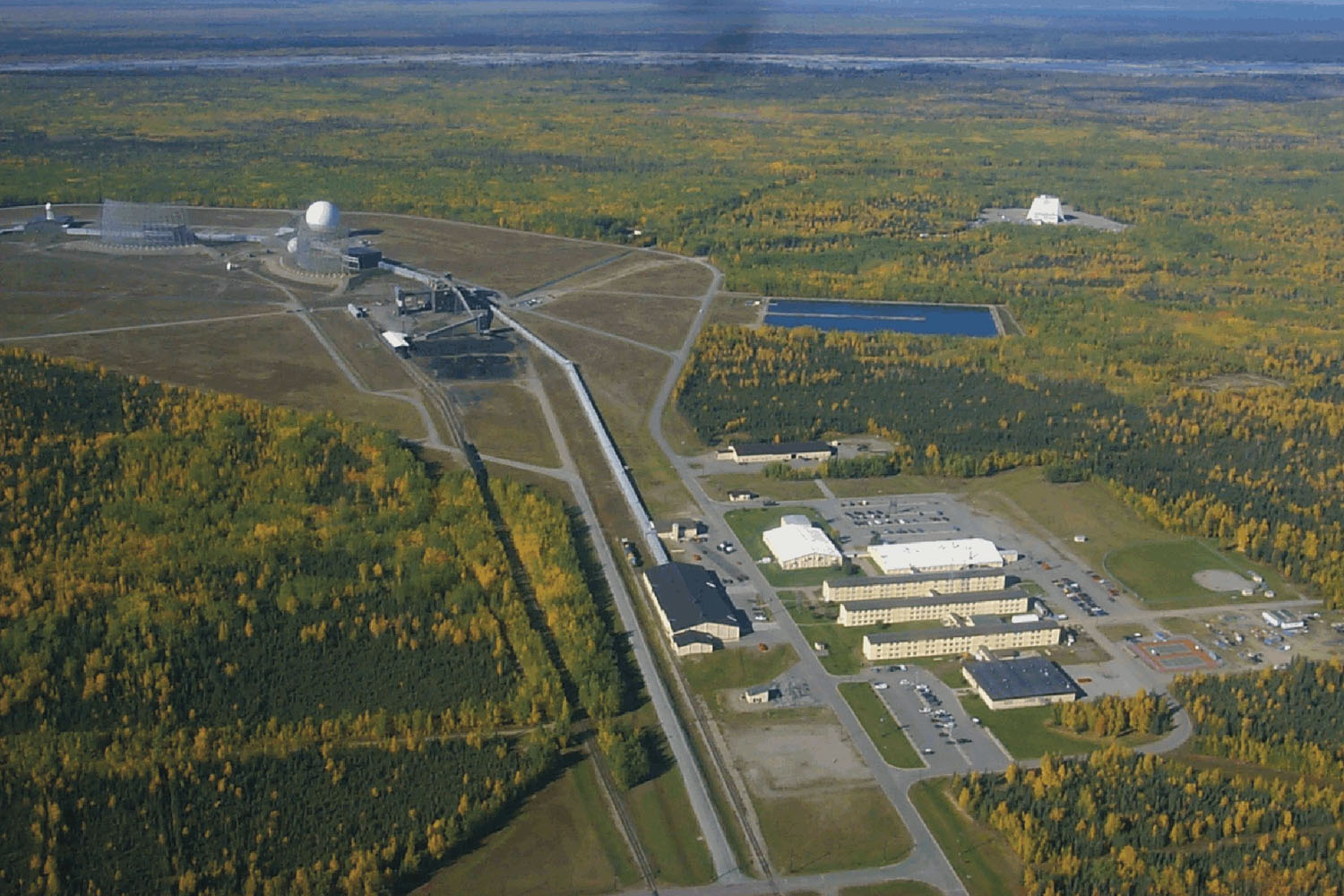
- Clear Air Force Station Alaska
- Active: 1967–present
- Country: United States
- Branch: Air National Guard
- Role: Missile Warning
- Part of: Alaska Air National Guard
- Garrison/HQ: Clear Air Force Station, Anderson, Alaska, USA
- Nickname: Frontier Sentinels
- Motto: Sentinels of Space (13th Missile Warning Squadron)
- Decorations: Air Force Outstanding Unit Award

Insignia
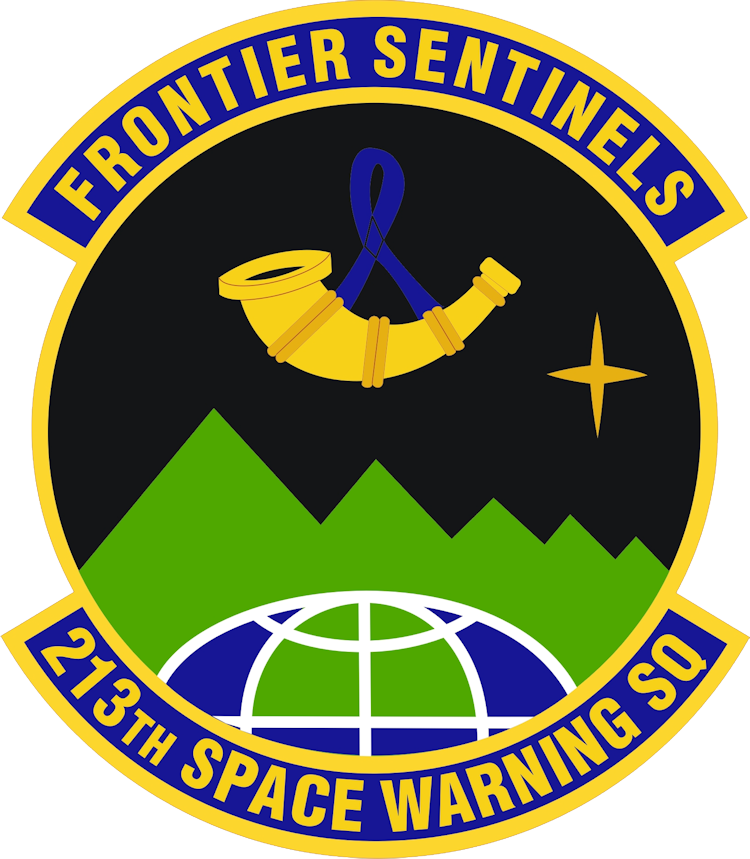
- 213th Space Warning Squadron emblem

The 213th Space Warning Squadron of the Alaska Air National Guard provides early warning of Intercontinental ballistic missiles and Submarine-launched ballistic missiles to the Missile Correlation Center of North American Aerospace Defense Command. The squadron is a geographically separated unit assigned to the 168th Wing at Eielson Air Force Base.

== Mission ==
The primary mission of the 213th Space Warning Squadron is to provide early warning of intercontinental ballistic missile and submarine-launched ballistic missile launches to the Missile Warning Center at North American Aerospace Defense Command (NORAD). The secondary mission of the squadron is to provide space surveillance data on orbiting objects to the NORAD Space Control Center.

== History ==
The Ballistic Missile Early Warning System (BMEWS) site at Clear Air Force Station began operation in November 1961, when Detachment 1, 71st Surveillance Wing took over the site from Air Force Systems Command. The detachment was composed of civilian contractors until 1964, when active duty United States Air Force personnel began to operate the site's tactical operations room. At the start of 1967, the detachment was replaced by the newly activated 13th Missile Warning Squadron.

In August 1967, a severe flood inundated the region surrounding Fairbanks, Alaska, and the squadron provided shelter to 216 refugees. The squadron was assigned its first female officer in 1973. By 1986, the squadron would be employing all-female crews. Because of a fire that destroyed part of a similar facility at Thule Air Base, Greenland, in 1981 the missile tracking radar and its radome were disassembled and replaced.

The radar at Clear was the last mechanically operated BMEWS site. In 1998 the radar began to be converted to a phased array radar by employing components of the PAVE PAWS submarine-launched ballistic missile detection site from the closed facility at Eldorado Air Force Station near Goodfellow Air Force Base, Texas. The new system, known as the Solid-State Phased-Array Radar System, achieved initial operating capability on 31 January 2001.

On 21 May 2004, the 213th activated at Clear Air Force Station. In 2006, the 213th Space Warning Squadron became the majority force provider to the mission of Clear Air Force Station by providing both space operations crews for the early warning radar and security forces for the installation. The early warning radar supports ballistic missile warning for threats to North America. Clear Air Force Station consists largely of Air National Guard members assigned to the 213th, but the smaller active duty squadron, 13th Space Warning Squadron, maintains responsibility for both the installation and execution of the mission.

== Lineage ==
- Constituted as the 13th Missile Warning Squadron on 1 November 1966 and activated (not organized)

Organized on 1 January 1967
Redesignated 13th Space Warning Squadron on 15 May 1992

- Redesignated 213th Space Warning Squadron, allotted to the Air National Guard, and federally recognized on 21 May 2004

=== Assignments ===
- Air Defense Command, 1 November 1966 (not organized)
- 71st Missile Warning Wing, 1 January 1967
- Fourteenth Aerospace Force, 30 April 1971
- Aerospace Defense Command, 1 October 1976
- 47th Air Division, 1 November 1979
- 1st Space Wing, 1 May 1983
- 21st Operations Group, 15 May 1992
- 168th Air Refueling Wing, 21 May 2004

=== Stations ===
- Clear Air Force Station, Alaska, 1 January 1967 – present

=== Awards ===
Award streamer	Award	Dates	Notes
	Air Force Outstanding Unit Award	1 June 1968 – 31 May 1970	13th Missile Warning Squadron
	Air Force Outstanding Unit Award	1 July 1971 – 30 June 1973	13th Missile Warning Squadron
	Air Force Outstanding Unit Award	1 May 1983 – 30 April 1984	13th Missile Warning Squadron
	Air Force Outstanding Unit Award	1 October 1995 – 30 September 1997	13th Space Warning Squadron
	Air Force Outstanding Unit Award	1 October 1997 – 30 September 1999	13th Space Warning Squadron
	Air Force Outstanding Unit Award	1 January 1998 – 31 December 1998	13th Space Warning Squadron

== See also ==
- List of United States Air Force space squadrons
