= Clear Space Force Station =

US Space Force station in Alaska

- Near Anderson, Alaska in the United States
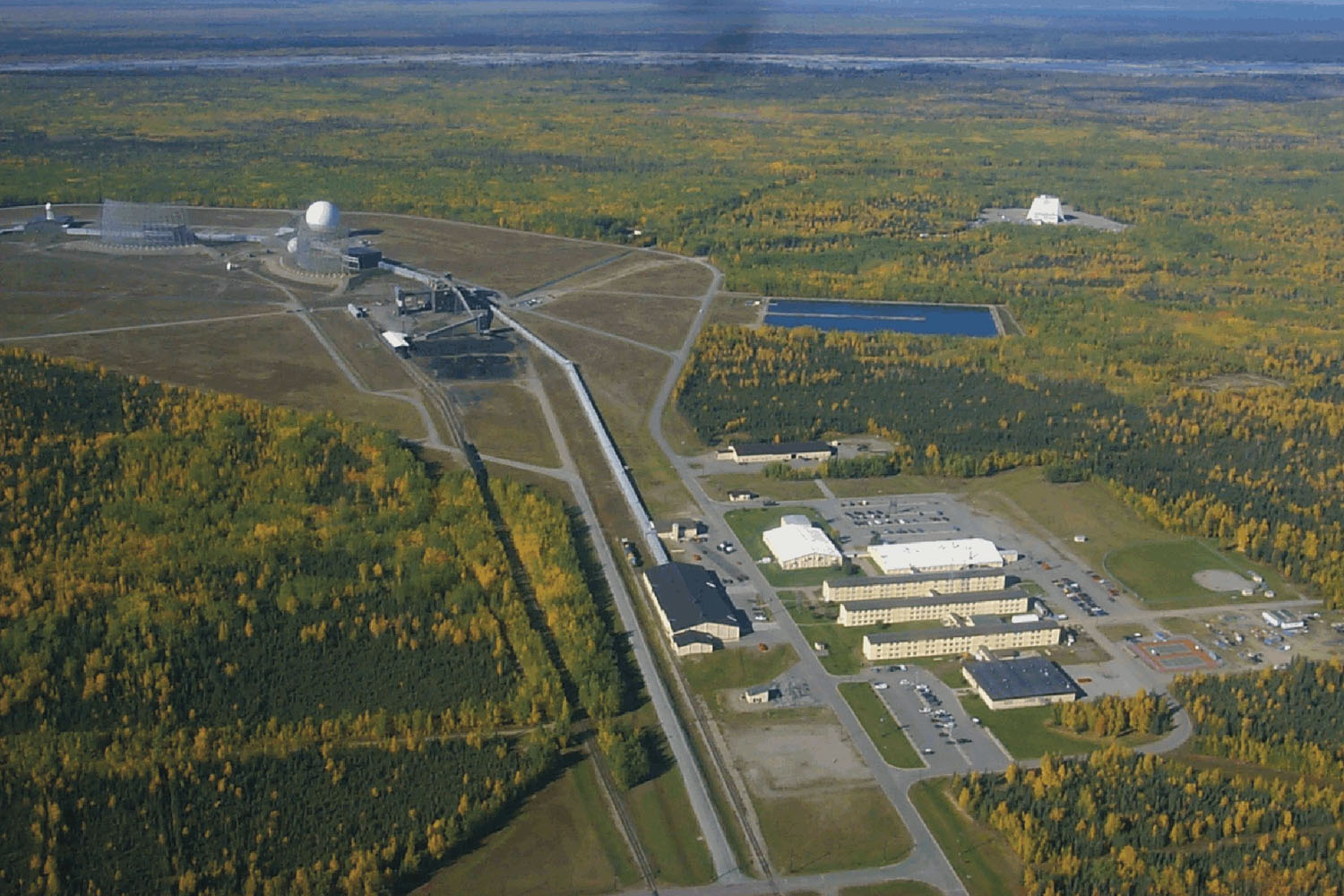
- An aerial image of Clear SFS in 1999.

- Emblem of Space Base Delta 2

Site information
- Type: US Space Force station
- Owner: Department of Defense
- Operator: United States Space Force
- Controlled by: Space Base Delta 2
- Condition: Operational
- Radar type: AN/FPS-123

Location
- Location in the United States
- Coordinates: 64°17′26″N 149°11′13″W

Site history
- Built: 1949 (as Clear Air Force Auxiliary Field)
- In use: 1949 – present

Garrison information
- Occupants: 13th Space Warning Squadron; 213th Space Warning Squadron

Clear Space Force Station is a United States Space Force radar station for detecting incoming ICBMs and submarine-launched ballistic missiles to NORAD's command center and to provide Space Surveillance data to the United States Space Force. Clear's AN/FPS-123 Upgraded Early Warning Radar is part of the Solid State Phased Array Radar System (SSPARS) which also includes those at Beale AFB, Cape Cod Space Force Station, RAF Fylingdales and Thule Site J. The "historic property" was one of the Alaska World War II Army Airfields and later a Cold War BMEWS site providing NORAD data to Colorado's BMEWS Central Computer and Display Facility (CC&DF).

In addition to the "original camp area" with buildings still in use today, areas of the station include the airfield (ICAO: PACL), the "SSPARS Site" the technical site (Utilador, BMEWS reflectors, support buildings, power plant), and the composite site (two permanent dormitories, a mess hall, recreation area, and administrative area). In addition to the Air National Guard unit, Clear has active duty USSF, Royal Canadian Air Force, civilian, and contractor personnel.

== History ==
PAVE PAWS and BMEWS coverage

The site was purchased by the Department of the Interior in 1949 for use as a gunnery range for Ladd Field. The site became Clear Air Force Auxiliary Field.

In May 1958 total costs for the planned BMEWS Site I at Thule and BMEWS Site II at Clear were estimated at ~$800 million. In October 1958 they were both estimated to be completed in September 1960. An additional 10-by-40-mile (16 km × 64 km) area was appropriated for the Clear site.

Clear is served by a spur of the Alaska Railroad, being about 15 kilometres (9.3 mi) south of Nenana and the Mears Memorial Bridge over the Tanana River that flows past Clear. This has transported coal for the power station and heavy equipment.

=== Clear Missile Early Warning Station ===
Clear Missile Early Warning Station construction began in August 1958 with 700 workers—i.e., a "construction" camp was being erected in September 1958 by "Patti-McDonald and Morrison-Knudsen" next to the railroad (for $1.7 million, 40,000 ft of railroad were moved by 1959.) Groundbreaking for radar structures was May 1959 ("Baker and Ford built a transmitter and computer building; a heat dissipation system; a radar transmitter building; wells and pumphouses; a fire station; and utilities") and the AN/FPS-50 pedestals were complete by June 2, 1959. In 1959 after the original White Alice Communications System contract, "the next segment of WACS... was series of TD-2 microwave installations to support... two routes [that] linked the Ballistic Missile Early Warning Site (BMEWS) at Clear AFB... one going down the southeast coast (the A route) to the Ketchikan-Seattle submarine cable*, and the other, going east to the Canada–US border (B Route) through Canada, down to the lower 48 which was Clear's Rearward Communications System to Murphy Dome (A Route) and the Gold King Creek AFS (B Route) with data for the Ent AFB CC&DF.

Three GE AN/FPS-50 Radar Sets were installed with antenna reflectors 165 by 400 feet (50 m × 122 m) that each weigh 1,000 short tons (910 t; 890 long tons). The "Building Two" middle transmitter building had the radar control room and room with the Sylvania AN/FSQ-28 Missile Impact Predictor Set.

The "Clear Msl Early Warning Stn, Nenana, AK" was assigned to Hanscom Field, Massachusetts, on April 1, 1961, and BMEWS Site II was completed July 1, 1961 (the date of IOC--Full operational capability was declared three months later.)

Clear transferred to Air Defense Command in November 1961. By mid-1962, BMEWS "quick fixes" for ECCM had been installed at Thule and Clear and by June 30, 1962, Ent AFB integration of BMEWS and SPADATS data was completed. On July 31, 1962, NORAD recommended a tracking radar at Clear to close the BMEWS gap with Thule for low-angle missiles (compared with those with the 15-65 degree angle for which BMEWS was designed) (North Dakota's Cavalier AFS radar built in 1975 currently monitors for Hudson Bay launches.)

=== Missile warning operations ===
Detachment 2 of the 71st Missile Warning Wing was responsible for operations by civilian contractor personnel until 1964, when Air Force personnel began permanently manning the Tactical Operations Room (TOR).

In 1964, the Good Friday earthquake struck, and Clear was unable to perform its mission for six minutes.

In 1966, the last of the five BMEWS tracking radars was installed, an RCA AN/FPS-92 Radar Set with an 84-foot (26 m) diameter antenna housed in a 42.7-meter (140 ft) diameter radome. The FPS-92 was an improved AN/FPS-49 Radar Set variant with radome blocks having two high-density 1 millimeter thick skins that cover a 15 centimeter thick Kraft-paper core (total of 1,646 hexagonal and pentagonal blocks (the hexagonal blocks were "66-inch panels".) The completion of the FPS-92 raised the final construction price of the missile warning system at Clear to $300 million. $62 million of this figure had been spent by the Alaska District of the Corps of Engineers.)

Clear provided emergency shelter for 216 flood refugees during August 1967, the same year many "temporary" buildings were replaced. Personnel at the installation subsequently provided measurements for a University of Alaska experiment which injected sulfur hexafluoride into the upper atmosphere to see if the Aurora Borealis could be affected. Clear had Bomb Alarm System equipment installed by the time the BAS was accepted on 10 February 1961. The BAS was deactivated in 1970. In 1975, the Secretary of Defense told Congress that Clear Air Force Station would be closed when the Shemya Island and Beale AFB radars became operational. After a Thule radome fire, Clear's FPS-92 radome was replaced in 1981 by first disassembling the tracker, constructing the new radome, and reconstructing the FPS-92. Clear's 1st all-female crew pulled its 1st shift on February 28, 1986 (the 1st female, Lt. Anderson was assigned in 1973.)

Beginning in 1987, ITT operated and maintained the Clear BMEWS under a USAF Space Command contract and in the 1990s, the Southwest Research Institute upgraded Clear's pulse modulator for the transmitter final-stage power amplifier.

=== Phased array radar ===
External images
- Dogsled near FPS-50 reflectors
- BMEWS radars after phased array was completed
- AN/FPS-132 Upgraded Early Warning Radar

On April 16, 1998, groundbreaking for installing 1987 AN/FPS-115 PAVE PAWS components from Texas (e.g., the array elements) was held at Clear for the more advanced Raytheon AN/FPS-120 with 2500 "solid state transmitter" modules. On December 15, 2000, the FPS-50 and −92 transmissions ceased (all of the Arecibo Observatory's Litton L-5773 klystrons were obtained as surplus from Clear's decommissioned BMEWS transmitters.) Clear's FPS-120 began 24-hour operations when Clear's SSPARS Site (separate from the BMEWS site) had Initial Operational Capability on January 31, 2001; the date the entire SSPARS became operational (SSPARS sites were modified in the Early Warning Radar Service Life Extension Program.)

On August 30, 2006, after a transition that began in 2001, the ANG's 213th Space Warning Squadron took on the early warning/space surveillance mission. BAE Systems began a 2007 contract for SSPARS maintenance, and the Clear FPS-120 was subsequently upgraded to an AN/FPS-132 Upgraded Early Warning Radar (UEWR) by Boeing Integrated Defense Systems "featuring processor and software improvements to enhance capability."

On 15 June 2021 it was renamed from Clear Air Force Station to Clear Space Force Station.

Long Range Discrimination Radar was being tested at the base in 2022.

== Based units ==
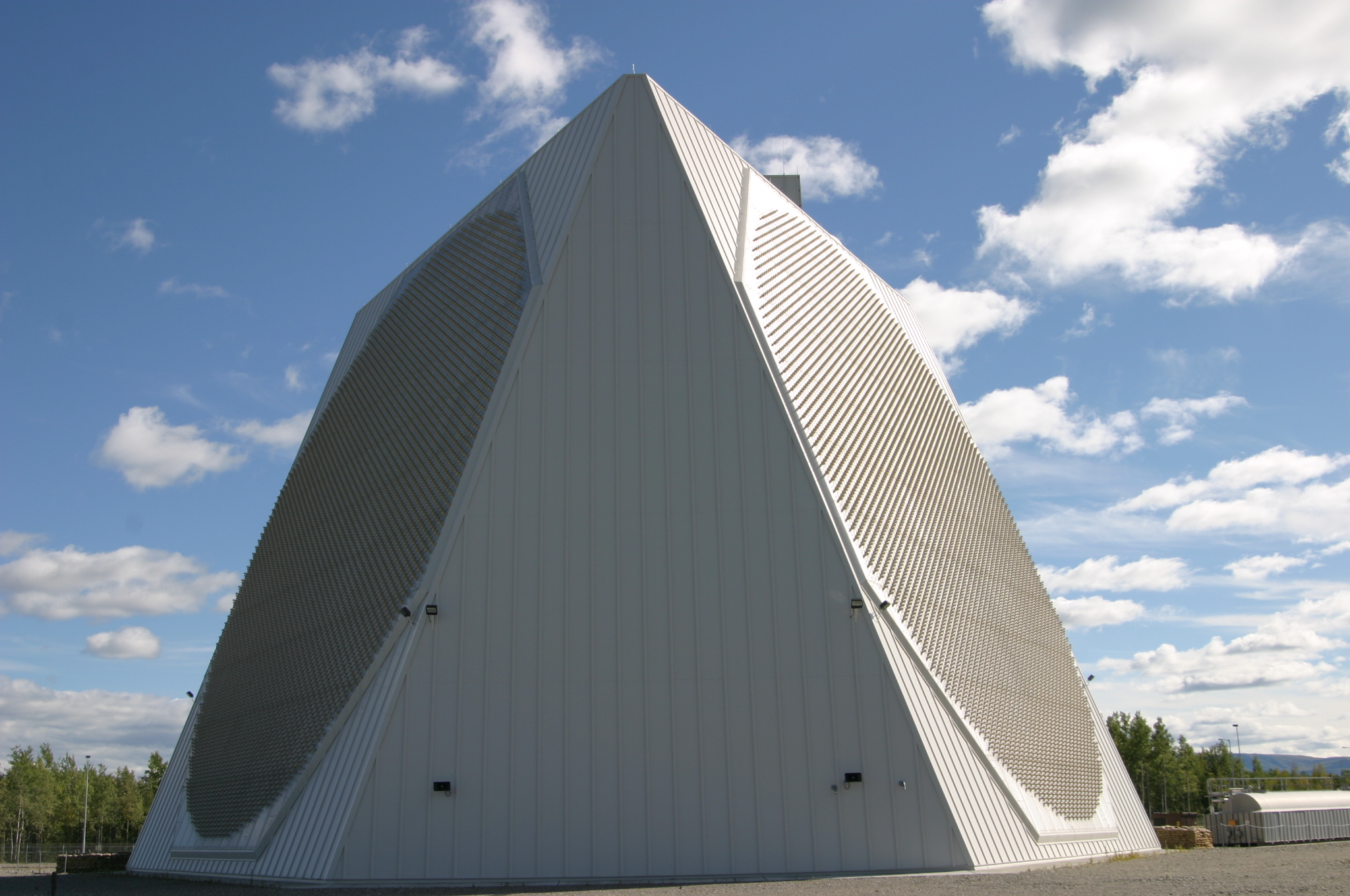
The 11-story tall phased array building

Units based at Clear Space Force Station.

Those marked as GSU are Geographically Separate Units, which although based at Clear, are subordinate to a unit based at another location.

=== United States Space Force ===
Space Force Combat Forces Command

- Space Delta 4
  - 13th Space Warning Squadron (GSU)

=== United States Air Force ===
Alaska Air National Guard

- 168th Wing
  - 168th Operations Group
    - 213th Space Warning Squadron (GSU)
    - 268th Security Forces Squadron (GSU)

== Units to which assigned ==
- 2006: 213th Space Warning Squadron
- 1983: 1st Space Wing (Air Force Space Command)
- 1979: 15th Air Force (Strategic Air Command)
- 1971: Fourteenth Aerospace Force (Aerospace Defense Command)
- 1967: 13th Missile Warning Squadron (Outstanding Unit Award in 1970 and 1973)
- 1961: Detachment 2, 71st Missile Warning Wing
- 1961: Electronic Systems Division
- 1949: Alaskan Air Command

== Amateur radio restrictions ==
The US Code of Federal Regulations specifies that amateur radio operators within 160 kilometers of Clear must not transmit with more than 50 watts of power on the 70-centimeter band.
