= 13th Space Warning Squadron =

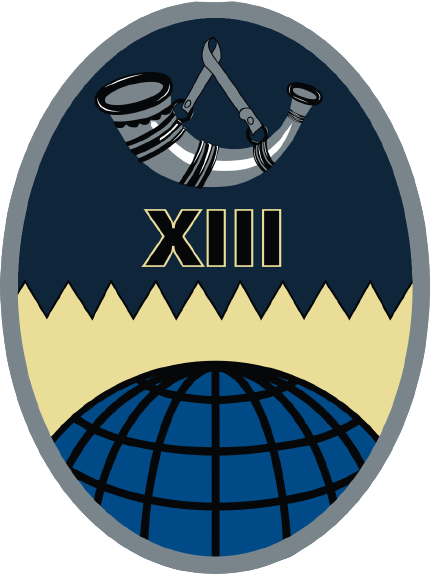
- 13th Space Warning Squadron emblem
- Active: 1967-Present
- Country: United States
- Branch: United States Space Force
- Type: Missile Warning
- Role: Combat Support
- Part of: Space Delta 4
- Garrison/HQ: Clear Space Force Station
- Motto: SENTINEL OF SPACE
- Decorations: AFOUA

Commanders
- Current commander: Lt Col Stephanie Flowers
- Notable commanders: Stephen Whiting

The 13th Space Warning Squadron (13SWS) is a missile warning unit assigned to the United States Space Force and located at Clear Space Force Station 5 miles (8 km) south of Anderson, Alaska

== Mission ==
The primary mission of the 13th SWS is to provide early warning of intercontinental ballistic missiles (ICBMs) and submarine-launched ballistic missiles (SLBMs) launches to the Missile Warning Center at North American Aerospace Defense Command. The secondary mission of the 13SWS is to provide space surveillance data on orbiting objects to the Space Control Center also located in the Cheyenne Mountain Complex.

== History ==
The 13th SWS is controlled by the Missile Warning Center, part of the NORAD, and by the Space Control Center, part of United States Strategic Command. Both agencies are located at the Cheyenne Mountain Operations Center in Colorado. Clear accomplishes these missions using the Solid State Phased Array Radar System (SSPARS) radar. Clear's radar was originally located at El Dorado Air Station, Texas as part of the PAVE PAWS program and was only recently transplanted to Alaska to replace the US' last mechanical missile warning radar site.

== Assignments ==
=== Major Command ===
- Air Force Space Command (1 May 1983–Present)
- Strategic Air Command (1 December 1979 – 1 May 1983)
- Air Defense Command (later Aerospace Defense Command) (1 November 1966 – 1 December 1979)

=== Wing/Group ===
- Space Delta 4 (later Mission Delta 4), 24 July 2020
- 21st Space Wing (15 May 1992–inactivation)
- 1st Space Wing (1 May 1983 – 14 May 1992)
- 47th Air Division, 1 December 1979;
- Alaskan ADCOM Region, 1 October 1976;
- Fourteenth Aerospace Force, 30 Apr 1971;
- 71st Missile Warning Wing, 1 January 1967
- Air Defense Command, 1 Nov 1966;

== Previous designations ==
- 13th Space Warning Squadron (15 May 1992–Present)
- 13th Missile Warning Squadron (1 November 1966 – 15 May 1992)

== Bases stationed ==
- Clear Missile Early Warning Station (later Clear AFS, Clear AS, and Clear Space Force Station), Alaska (1 January 1967–Present)

== Decorations ==
- Air Force Outstanding Unit Award
  - 1 October 1997 – 30 September 1999
  - 1 January 1998 – 31 December 1998
  - 1 October 1995 – 30 September 1997
  - 1 May 1983 – 30 April 1984
  - 1 July 1971 – 30 June 1973
  - 1 June 1968 – 31 May 1970

== List of commanders ==
- Lt Col Stephen Whiting, July 2004–July 2005
- Lt Col Torrence W. Saxe, June 2011–March 2012
- Lt Col Michael Sowa, ~2010
- Lt Col Matthew A. Morand, June 2012–May 2013
- Lt Col Jason Burch, June 2015
- Lt Col Joel Lane, 13 June 2017
- Lt Col Jeffrey Rutherford, 13 June 2018
- Lt Col Shawn P. Lee, 20 June 2019
- Lt Col Shahn Rashid, 2 July 2020
- Lt Col William Hassey, June 2021
- Lt Col Christopher Castle, 16 June 2022
- Lt Col Stephanie Flowers, June 2023
