= 3d Space Communications Squadron =

U.S. Space Force unit

3rd Satellite Communications Squadron
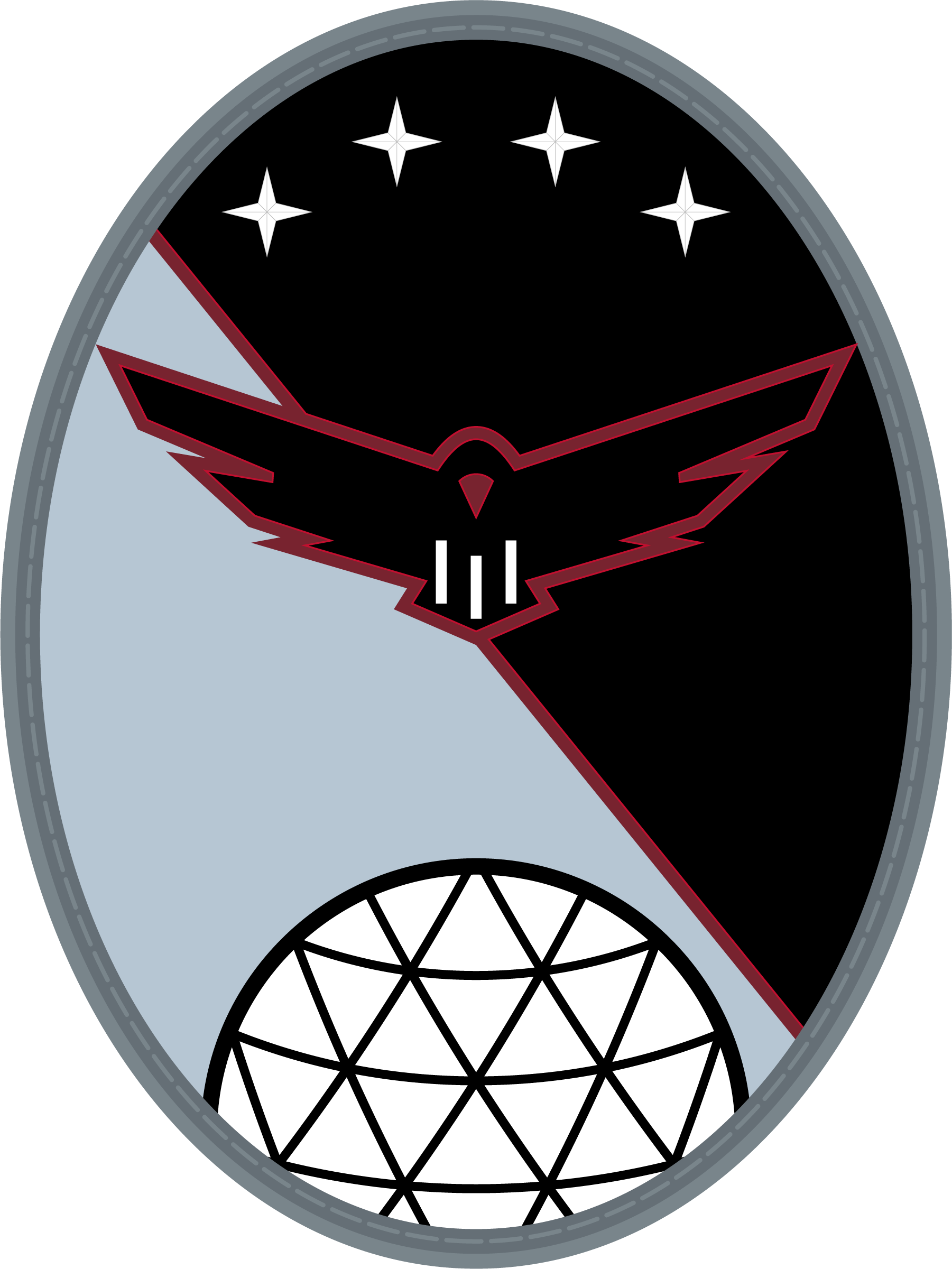
- 3 SCS emblem
- Active: 1983-2002, 24 March 2022–present
- Country: United States
- Branch: United States Space Force
- Type: Squadron
- Role: Space domain awareness
- Part of: Mission Delta 4
- Garrison/HQ: Buckley Space Force Base, Colorado, U.S.
- Nickname: Ravens
- Motto: ALWAYS VIGILANT
- Decorations: AFOUA

Commanders
- Current commander: Maj James Hur

The 3rd Satellite Communications Squadron (3 SCS) is a United States Space Force unit responsible for maintaining critical communication for missile warning. It is a part of Mission Delta 4 and headquartered at Buckley Space Force Base, Colorado. It was activated on 24 March 2022 after inactivating Space Delta 4, Detachment 1. Formerly it was a space communications squadron located at Kapaun AS, Germany.

== Previous Designations ==
- 3d Space Communications Squadron (1 May 1992 – 1 August 2002)
- 3d Communications Squadron (1 August 1986 – 1 May 1992)
- Detachment 6, 1st Space Wing (1 May 1983 – 1 August 1986)

== Assignments ==
=== Major Command ===
- Air Force Space Command (1 August 1986 – 1 August 2002)

=== Numbered Air Force ===
- 14th Air Force (1 July 1993 – 1 August 2002)

=== Wing/Group ===
- 21st Space Wing (15 May 1992 – 1 August 2002)
- 1st Space Wing (1 August 1986 – 15 May 1992)

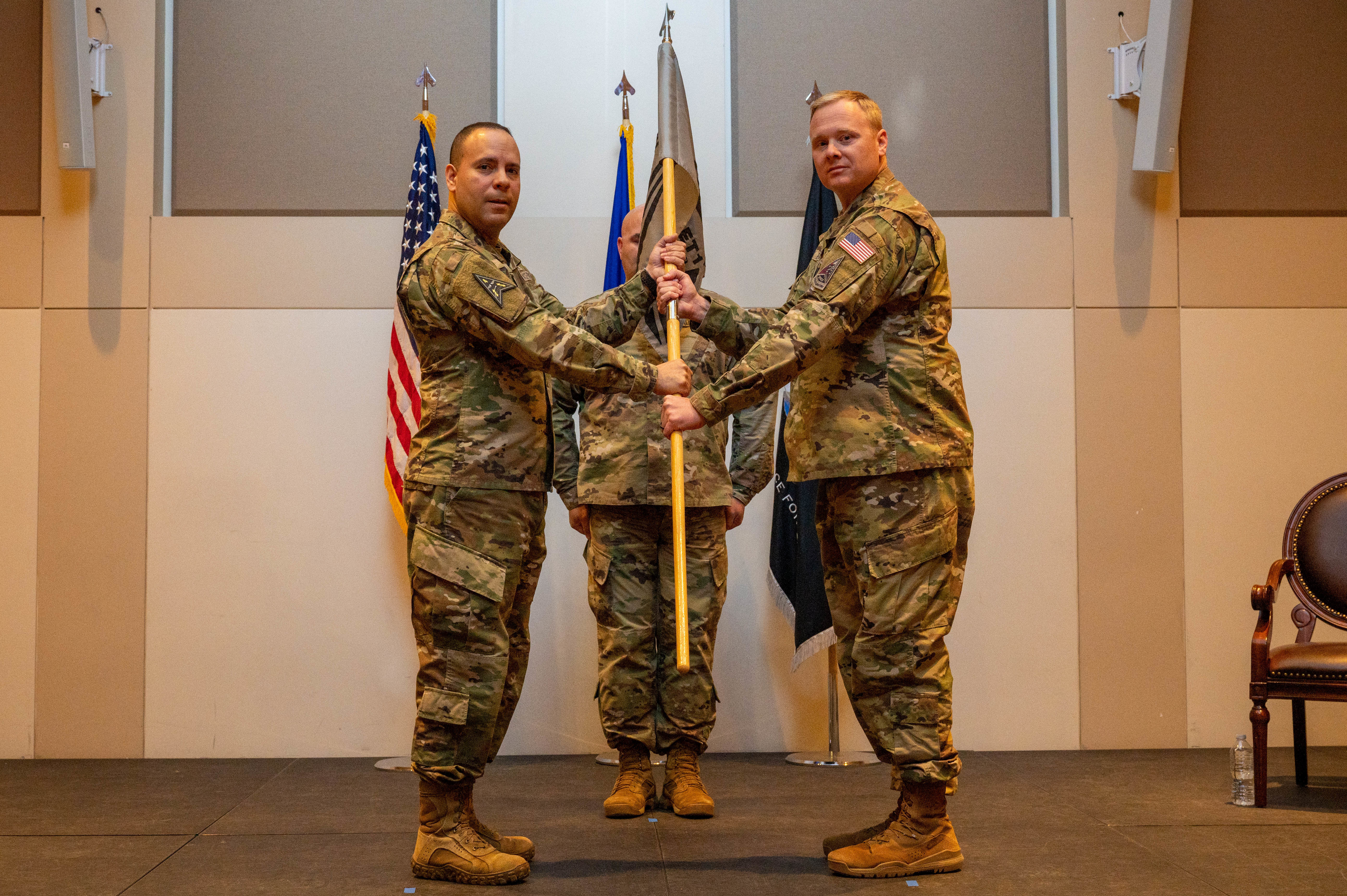
2024 reactivation

== Locations ==
- Kapaun AS, Germany (1 May 1983 – 1 August 2002)

== Commanders ==
- Lt Col Susan A. Goodrich (c. August 1994)
- Maj Luke Basham, 24 March 2022 – 23 June 2023
- Maj James Hur, 23 June 2023–present

== Decorations ==
- Air Force Outstanding Unit Award
  - 1 May 1983 – 30 April 1984 (as Det 6, 1st Space Wing)

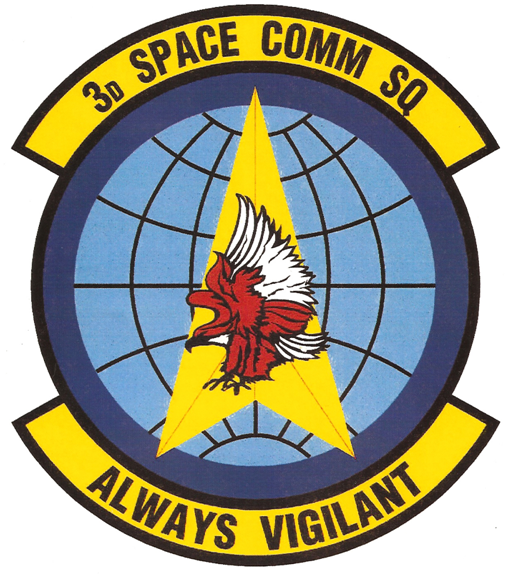
Previous emblem
