= 10th Space Warning Squadron =

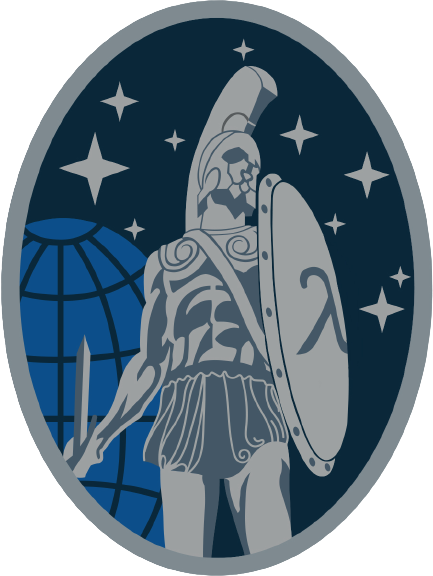
- 10th Space Warning Squadron emblem
- Active: 1986-Present
- Country: United States
- Branch: United States Space Force
- Type: Space Warning
- Role: Missile Warning
- Part of: Space Delta 4
- Garrison/HQ: Cavalier Space Force Station, North Dakota
- Nickname: Spartans
- Motto: INSTANT TO WATCHFUL INSTANT
- Decorations: ASOUA

Commanders
- Current commander: Lt Col Keith Marshall

Insignia
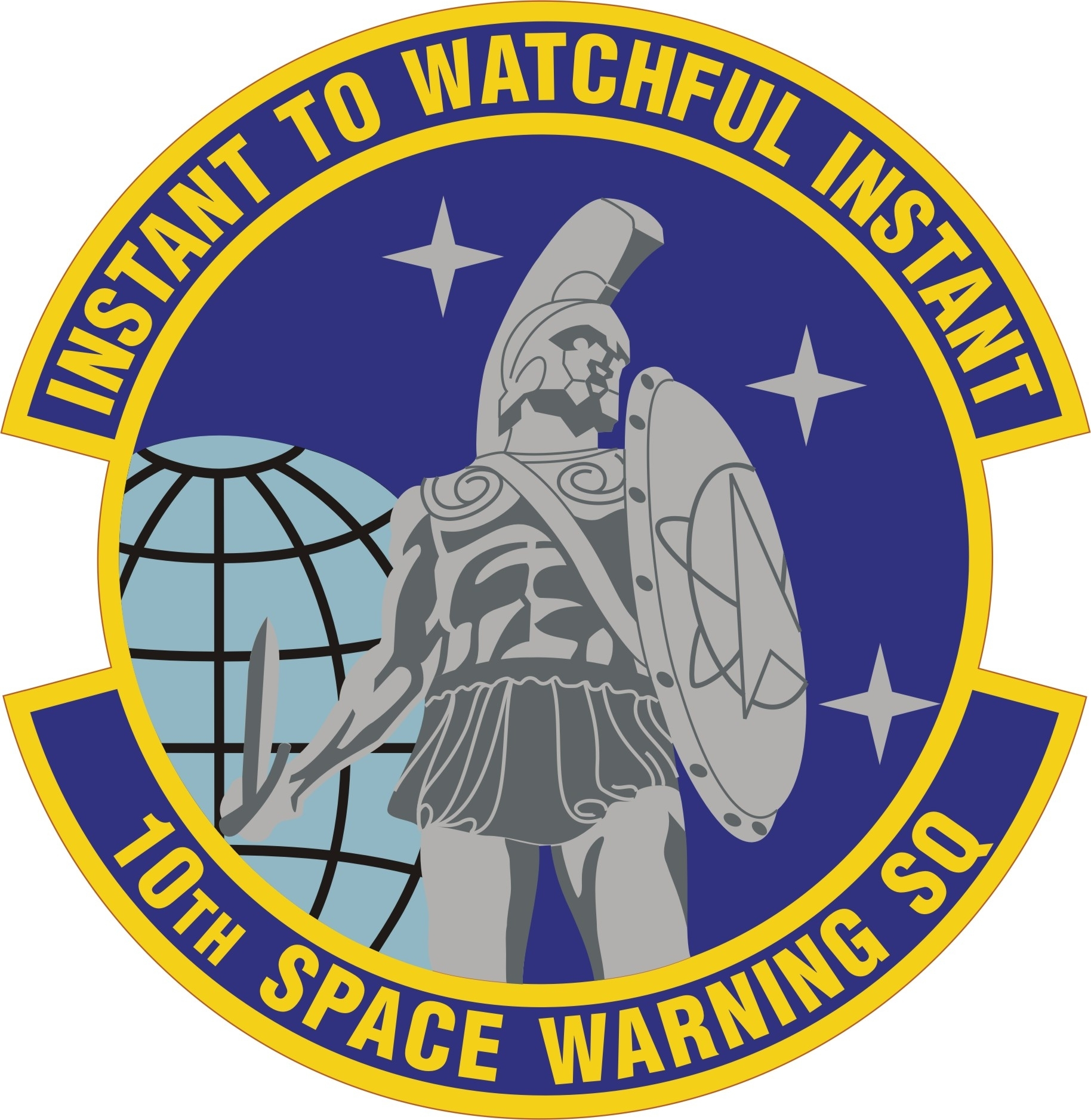
- Former 10th Space Warning Squadron emblem c.2020

The United States Space Force's 10th Space Warning Squadron (10 SWS), is a missile warning unit located at Cavalier Space Force Station, North Dakota operating the AN/FPQ-16 Perimeter Acquisition Radar Attack Characterization System.

== Mission ==
10 SWS provides tactical warning and attack assessment of sea-launched and intercontinental ballistic missiles launched against the continental United States and southern Canada. Additionally, 10 SWS provides surveillance, tracking and space object identification for the United States Space Command Space Surveillance Network (SSN).

== History ==
The unit was originally the acquisition radar portion of the United States' only operational anti-ballistic missile system, known as SAFEGUARD. Due to the 1972 Anti-Ballistic Missile Treaty (SALT II), components of the SAFEGUARD complex, with the exception of the PARCS radar at Cavalier Space Force Station, were deactivated in February 1976. The forerunner of the present day 10th SWS began passing tactical warning and attack assessment data to the Cheyenne Mountain Complex, Colo., in January 1977. In December 1979 the unit was transferred from Aerospace Defense Command to Strategic Air Command. The unit, as it exists today, joined Air Force Space Command in 1983 as Detachment 5, 1st Space Wing. On 10 July 1986, the unit was re-designated as the 10th Missile Warning Squadron, and was activated on 1 August 1986. It was renamed the 10th Space Warning Squadron on May 15, 1992, when the 1st Space Wing and 3d Space Support Wing were inactivated and the 21st Space Wing was activated. On 24 July 2020, with the establishment of Space Delta 4, the 21st Space Wing and all of its subordinates were fully integrated into the United States Space Force.

== Previous Designations ==
- 10th Space Warning Squadron (15 May 1992–Present)
- 10th Missile Warning Squadron (10 July 1986 – 15 May 1992)
- Detachment 5, 1st Space Wing (1983-10 July 1986)

== Assignments ==
=== Major Command ===
- Space Operations Command (24 July 2020-Present)
- Air Force Space Command (10 July 1983–24 July 2020)
- Strategic Air Command (1979–1983)
- Aerospace Defense Command (??-1979)

=== Numbered Air Force ===
- 14th Air Force (??-24 July 2020)

=== Wing/Group ===
- Mission Delta 4 (24 July 2020-Present)
- 21st Space Wing (15 May 1992–24 July 2020)
- 1st Space Wing (1983-15 May 1992)

== List of commanders ==
- Lt Col Donald T. Kidd, 19 August 1996 – 30 Mar 1998
- Lt Col Ling Yung, ~2005
- Lt Col Keith W. Balts, June 2007 – June 2009
- Lt Col Lorinda Frederick, 14 June 2011 – ~10 July 2013
- Lt Col Michelle R. Kneupper, 10 July 2013 – ~July 2015
- Lt Col John M. Koehler II, July 2015 – ~23 June 2017
- Lt Col Stephen A. Hobbs, 23 June 2017 – 11 June 2019
- Lt Col Ryan Durand, 11 June 2019 – 11 June 2021
- Lt Col Travis Kennebeck, 11 June 2021 – 15 June 2023
- Lt Col Michael Stobie, 15 June 2023 – 2 July 2025

== Decorations ==
- Air and Space Outstanding Unit Award
  - 1 October 2012 - 31 Sept 2014
  - 1 October 2005 - 31 Sept 2007
  - 1 January 2000 - 31 August 2000
  - 1 January 1999 - 31 December 1999
  - 1 January 1998 – 31 December 1998
  - 1 October 1997 – 30 September 1999
  - 1 October 1995 – 30 September 1997
  - 1 October 1992 - 30 September 1994
  - 1 December 1989 - 31 August 1991 (as 10th Missile Warning Squadron)
  - 1 October 1988 – 30 November 1989 (as 10th Missile Warning Squadron)
  - 1 May 1983 - 30 April 1984 (as Detachment 5, 1st Space Wing)
