= 21st Space Wing =

Inactive United States Air Force wing

21st Wing
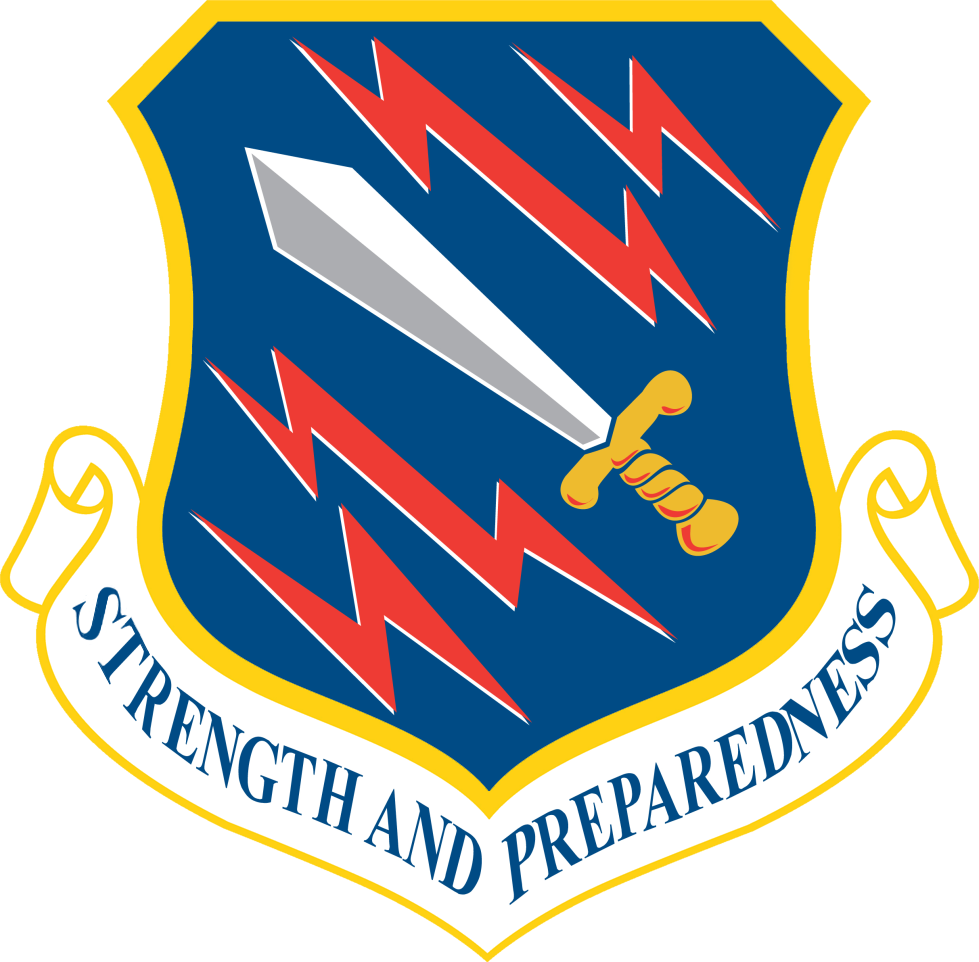
- Shield of the 21st Wing
- Active: 1 January 1953 (as 21st Fighter-Bomber Wing)–24 July 2020
- Country: United States
- Branch: United States Air Force
- Type: Wing
- Nickname: Knights
- Mottos: "Strength and Preparedness"
- Decorations: Distinguished Unit Citation Air Force Outstanding Unit Award

The 21st Space Wing (21 WG) is an inactive wing of the United States Air Force.

It was established in 1953 as the 21st Fighter-Bomber Wing, deploying to Europe to join NATO's Allied Command Europe, before being inactivated in 1958. It reactivated in 1958 as the 21st Tactical Fighter Wing, executing air defense operations over Japan and deterring North Korea, being inactivated in 1960. It was reactivated in 1966 as the 21st Composite Wing, and in 1979 redesignated the 21st Tactical Fighter Wing, performing air defense, close air support, and a variety of other missions in Alaska, before being redesignated the 21st Wing and being inactivated in 1991.

The 21st Wing was activated as a space wing on 15 May 1992, replacing the 1st Space Wing and 3rd Space Support Wing. It was inactivated on 24 July 2020 and replaced by the Peterson-Schriever Garrison, with the 21st Operations Group being redesignated as Space Delta 2, the 73 Space Group was redesignated as Space Delta 3, and its ground–based missile warning units, combined with overhead persistent infrared units of the 460th Operations Group, was redesignated as Space Delta 4.

== Operations ==
The 21st Space Wing was the United States Space Force's ground–based missile warning and space control wing. It was also the Space Force's, and prior to its transfer the Air Force's, most geographically dispersed wing, with forces spread across 22 locations. Its ground–based radars included the Precision Acquisition Vehicle Entry Phased Array Warning System (PAVE PAWS), Ballistic Missile Early Warning System (BMEWS), and Perimeter Attack Radar Characterization System (PARCS). At the time of its inactivation on 24 July 2020, the 21st Space Wing had 4,200 space professionals and airmen under its command.

The 21st Space Wing served as the host wing for Peterson Air Force Base, providing base support for the combined United States–Canadian North American Aerospace Defense Command, United States Space Command, United States Northern Command, elements of the United States Army's Space and Missile Defense Command, the United States Air Force's 367th Recruiting Squadron, and Air Force Reserve Command's 302nd Airlift Wing.

== Structure in 2020 ==
21st Operations Group (21 OG)

- 6th Space Warning Squadron (6 SWS), Cape Cod Air Force Station
- 7th Space Warning Squadron (7 SWS), Beale Air Force Base
- 10th Space Warning Squadron (10 SWS), Cavalier Air Force Station
- 12th Space Warning Squadron (12 SWS), Thule Air Base
- 13th Space Warning Squadron (13 SWS), Clear Air Force Station
- 18th Space Control Squadron (18 SPCS), Vandenberg Air Force Base
- 20th Space Control Squadron (20 SPCS), Eglin Air Force Base
  - Detachment 1, 20th Space Control Squadron, White Sands Missile Range
  - Detachment 2, 20th Space Control Squadron, Naval Support Facility Diego Garcia
  - Detachment 3, 20th Space Control Squadron, Air Force Maui Optical and Supercomputing observatory
- Operating Location – Fylingdales (OL-F), RAF Fylingdales
- 21st Operations Support Squadron (21 OSS)

21st Mission Support Group (21 MSG)

- 21st Civil Engineer Squadron (21 CES)
- 21st Communications Squadron (21 CS)
- 21st Contracting Squadron (21 CONS)
- 21st Force Support Squadron (21 FSS)
- 21st Security Forces Squadron (21 SFS)

21st Medical Group (21 MDG)

- 21st Healthcare Operations Squadron (21 HCOS)
- 21st Operational Medical Readiness Squadron (21 OMRS)

721st Operations Group (721 OG)

- 4th Space Control Squadron (4 SCS)
- 5th Space Control Squadron (5 SCS)
- 16th Space Control Squadron (16 SCS)
- 721st Operations Support Squadron (721 OSS)

821st Air Base Group (821 ABG), Thule Air Base

- 821st Support Squadron (821 SPTS)
- 821st Security Forces Squadron (821 SFS)

21st Comptroller Squadron (21 CPTS)

== Shield ==
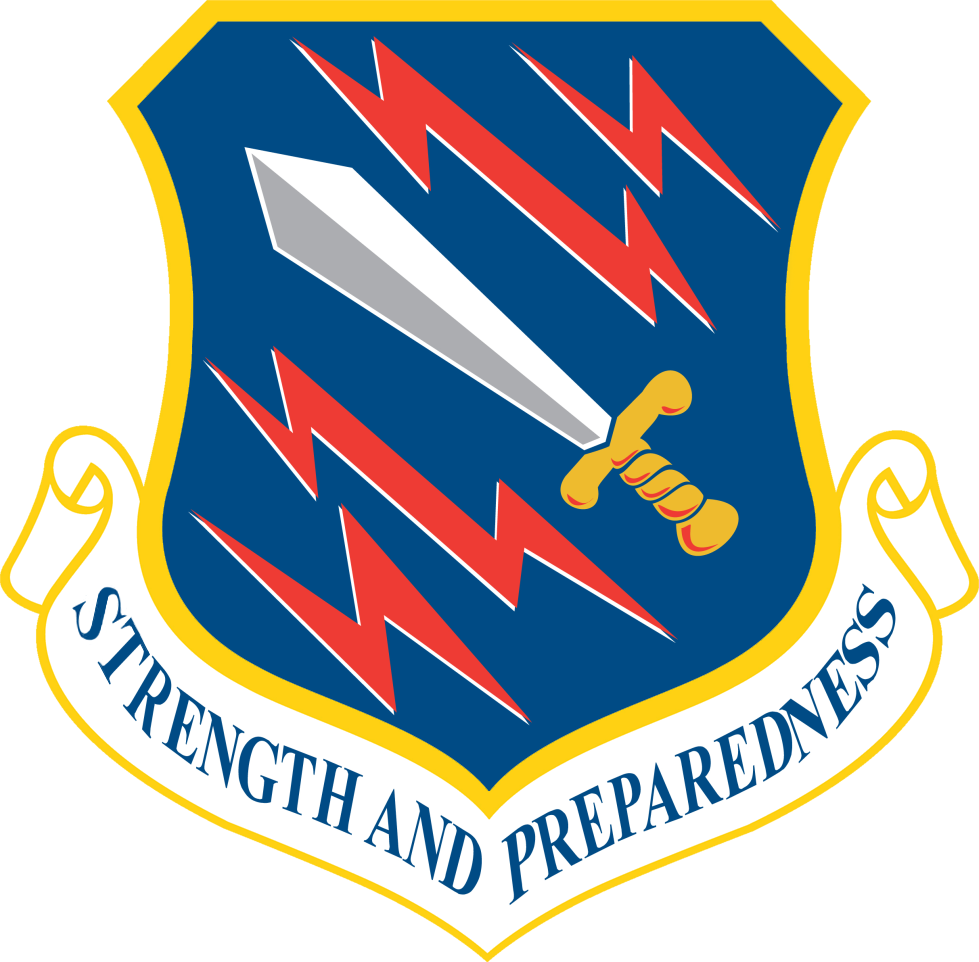
21st Space Wing shield

The 21st Space Wing shield was approved for use on 23 July 1957. The blue shield represents the sky, which is the 21st Space Wing's area of operations. The upraised sword represents the strength and readiness of the 21st Space Wing to perform its mission, in both peace and war. The lightning is symbol of the heavens beyond and the power of the 21st Space Wing. The blue, red, and yellow signify the three original fighter squadrons of the 21st Fighter-Bomber wing. The motto of the 21st Space Wing, "Strength and Preparedness" was derived from the original motto of the 21st Fighter-Bomber Wing, "Fortitudo et Preparatio."

== History ==
=== 21st Fighter-Bomber Wing (1953–1958) ===
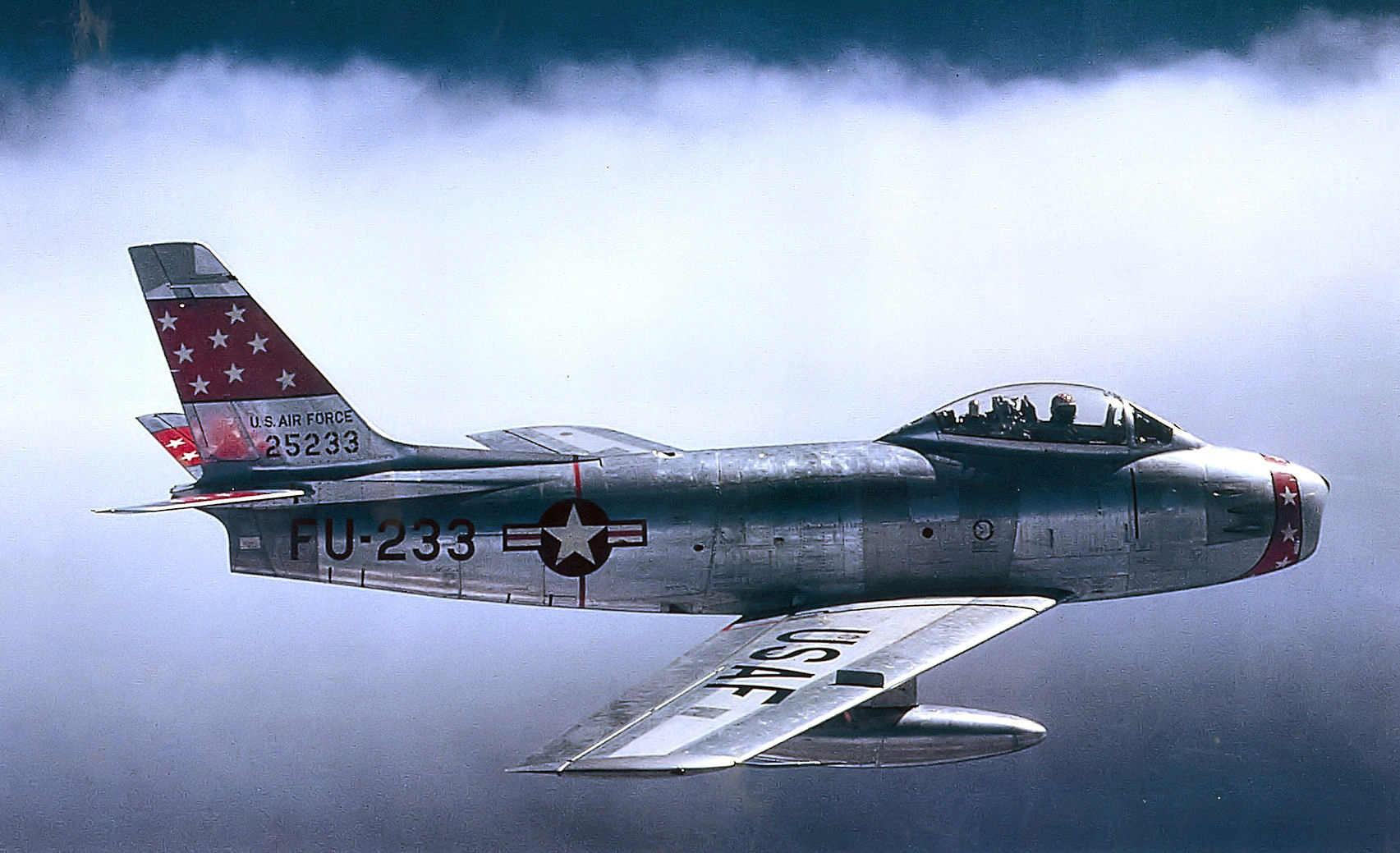
72nd Fighter-Bomber Squadron North American F-86F Sabre

On 1 January 1953 the 21st Fighter-Bomber Wing (21 FBW) was activated as a part of Tactical Air Command's Ninth Air Force at George Air Force Base, California. It directly commanded the 21st Fighter-Bomber Group, which oversaw the 72nd Fighter-Bomber Squadron, 416th Fighter-Bomber Squadron, and the 531st Fighter-Bomber Squadron. All fighter-bomber squadrons initially flew North American F-51 Mustang piston engine fighters, but within six months of activation upgraded to fly the North American F-86F Sabre jet fighter.

In September and October 1953, each of the 21st Fighter-Bomber Wing's squadrons rotated through a two-week arctic indoctrination program at Eielson Air Force Base, Alaska to prepare it for winter warfare operations. The 21st FBW also participated in defense diplomacy, sending six of its F-86F Sabres to participate in Project Willtour, visiting twelve different Central American, South American, and Caribbean states and performing joint training with their armed forces. In April and May 1954 the 21 FBW conducted Operation Boxkite, an exercise at North Field, South Carolina, which was designed to test the ability of a tactical wing to deploy to a forward base and sustain combat operations for thirty days.

On 22 June 1954 it was announced that the 21st Fighter-Bomber Wing would be transferred to Europe to reinforce NATO forces deterring the Soviet Union and Warsaw Pact. On 12 December 1954 it was reassigned to United States Air Forces in Europe's Twelfth Air Force and stationed at Chambley Air Base, France, however the airbase was not operational until June 1956. The fighter-bomber squadrons deployed in four tranches between November 1954 and January 1955, with flying units making stopovers at Labrador, Greenland, Iceland, and Scotland. When they arrived in France the fighter-bomber squadrons operated out of alternate airfields until Chambley AB could support flying operations.

In Europe the 21st Fighter-Bomber Wing conduced close air support exercises with United States Army Europe, as well as NATO's Northern Army Group and Central Army Group. They also took part in USAFE's gunnery meet at Wheelus Field, Libya and the "Carte Blanche" atomic warfare exercise. In 1956, the 21st Fighter-Bomber Wing also took second place at the gunnery meet at Nellis Air Force Base, Nevada and won the USAFE Award for Tactical Proficiency for January–June 1957.

Among the pilots of the 21st Fighter-Bomber wing was then First Lieutenant Michael Collins, who would later go on to become a NASA astronaut on Apollo 11, the first crewed mission to the Moon.

On 8 February 1958 the 21st Fighter-Bomber Wing was inactivated, with its assets distributed to various USAFE units.

=== 21st Tactical Fighter Wing (1958–1960) ===
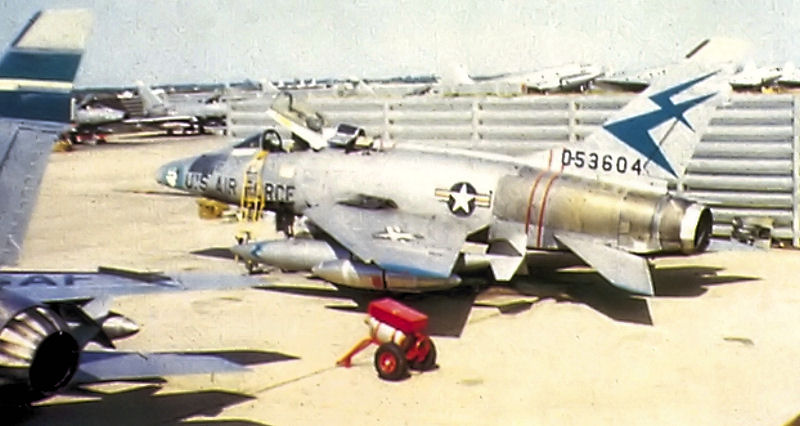
416 TFS F-100D at Kunsan AB, South Korea

On 1 July 1958 the 21st Tactical Fighter Wing (21 TFW) was reactivated at Misawa Air Base, Japan. Initially directly subordinated to Pacific Air Forces' Fifth Air Force, on 10 November 1958 the 21 TFW was reassigned to Fifth Air Force's 39th Air Division. The 21st Tactical Fighter Wing was composed of the 416th Tactical Fighter Squadron, 531st Tactical Fighter Squadron, 21st Armament and Electronics Squadron, 21st Field Maintenance Squadron, and the 21st Tactical Hospital.

The 21st Tactical Fighter Wing was tasked, along with the Japan Air Self Defense Force, with the air defense of northern Japan against Soviet Air Forces aircraft. The 21 TFW was also postured to perform strategic bombing against North Korea as enumerated in the Quick Strike contingency plan, if hostilities broke out again. At the time of reactivation both the 416th Tactical Fighter Squadron and 531st Tactical Fighter Squadron flew Republic F-84G Thunderjet fighter-bomber, however, the 531 TFS began transitioning to the North American F-100D Super Sabre, with the 416 TFS performing the warfighting mission in the interim. Once the 531 TFS became fully combat capable in April 1959 it assumed the warfighting mission and the 416 TFS began transitioning to the F-100D.

Even with two units transitioning to different platforms, the 21st Tactical Fighter Wing still managed to achieve an "Excellent" rating in the Fifth Air Force's tactical evaluation and operational readiness inspection in August and September 1959, achieving the best bomb score average in the history of the Fifth Air Force. These training successes were repeated in operations, with the 21st Tactical Fighter Wing regularly intercepting Soviet Air Forces Tupolev Tu-16 Badger and Myasishchev M-4 Bison bombers encroaching on Japanese airspace, with First Lieutenant Charles Ferguson of the 531st Fighter Squadron achieving the first ever interception of a M-4 Bison bomber on 1 October 1959 and others taking valuable air-to-air photos of the Tu-16 Badger bomber for Air Force intelligence.

In addition to conducting air defense operations, the 21st Tactical Fighter Wing also deployed forces to South Korea, deterring North Korea from resuming hostilities. On 7 August 1959, two F-100D's from the 531st Tactical Fighter Squadron conducted the first transpolar flight by American jet aircraft, flying from Weathersfield, England to Eielson Air Force Base, Alaska. On 18 June 1960 the 21st Tactical Fighter Wing was inactivated again, due to the United States placing a limit on the amount of fighter wings in the Air Force, resulting in a reorganization of Fifth Air Force. The assets of the 21st Tactical Fighter Wing were transferred among the rest of the assets of the 39th Air Division.

=== 21st Composite Wing (1966–1979), 21st Tactical Fighter Wing (1979–1991), and 21st Wing (1991) ===
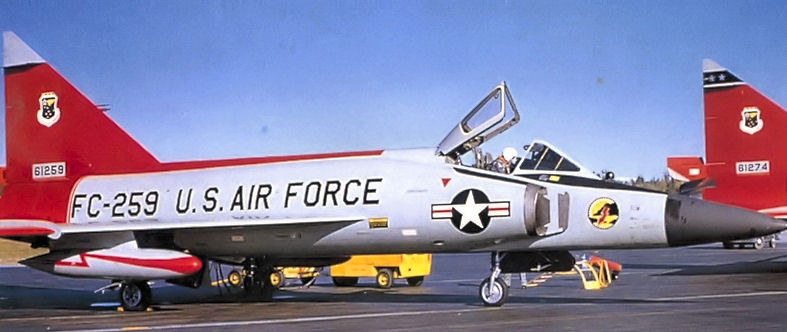
317th Fighter-Interceptor Squadron Convair F-102A Delta Dagger interceptor

On 8 July 1966 the 21st Composite Wing (21 CW) was reactivated at Elmendorf Air Force Base, Alaska and assigned to Alaskan Air Command, which also supported Continental Air Defense Command and the Alaskan NORAD Region. As a composite wing, it was assigned the missions of air defense, tactical airlift, and search and rescue.

The air defense mission was carried out by the 317th Fighter-Interceptor Squadron, which was equipped with the Convair F-102A Delta Dagger and TF-102 interceptors, two of which were always on alert at Elmendorf Air Force Base, Eielson Air Force Base, King Salmon Airport, and Galena Airport. 317 FIS was considered an elite unit, having been the only squadron to have won the Hughes Achievement Trophy for air defense three times. The 17th Troop Carrier Squadron, which was redesignated the 17th Tactical Airlift Squadron in 1967, conducted the airlift mission with Douglas C-124 Globemaster II and Lockheed C-130 Hercules tactical transports, performing resupply to Alaskan Air Command and Army air defense and space tracking radars. 17 TAS also stationed two cold-weather C-130s at Sondrestrom Air Base, Greenland to support the Distant Early Warning Line. The search and rescue mission was conducted by the 21st Operations Squadron and 5040th Helicopter Squadron, which flew the Piasecki H-21 helicopters. The 21st Operations Squadron also flew the Douglas C-47 Skytrain, Douglas C-54 Skymaster, Douglas C-118 Liftmaster, and Douglas C-124 Globemaster II transports to perform utility airlift. On 1 January 1970, the 21st Operations Squadron was inactivated, and the search and rescue mission was entirely turned over to the 5040th Helicopter Squadron, which also transitioned from the older H-21s to the Sikorsky HH-3E Jolly Green Giant. On 1 October 1971, the 5041st Tactical Operations Squadron was activating, operating a variety of aircraft, including the Douglas C-124 Globemaster II, Lockheed T-33 Shooting Star, North American T-39 Sabreliner, Douglas EC-118, Douglas VC-118, Martin B-57 Canberra, and Martin EB-57.

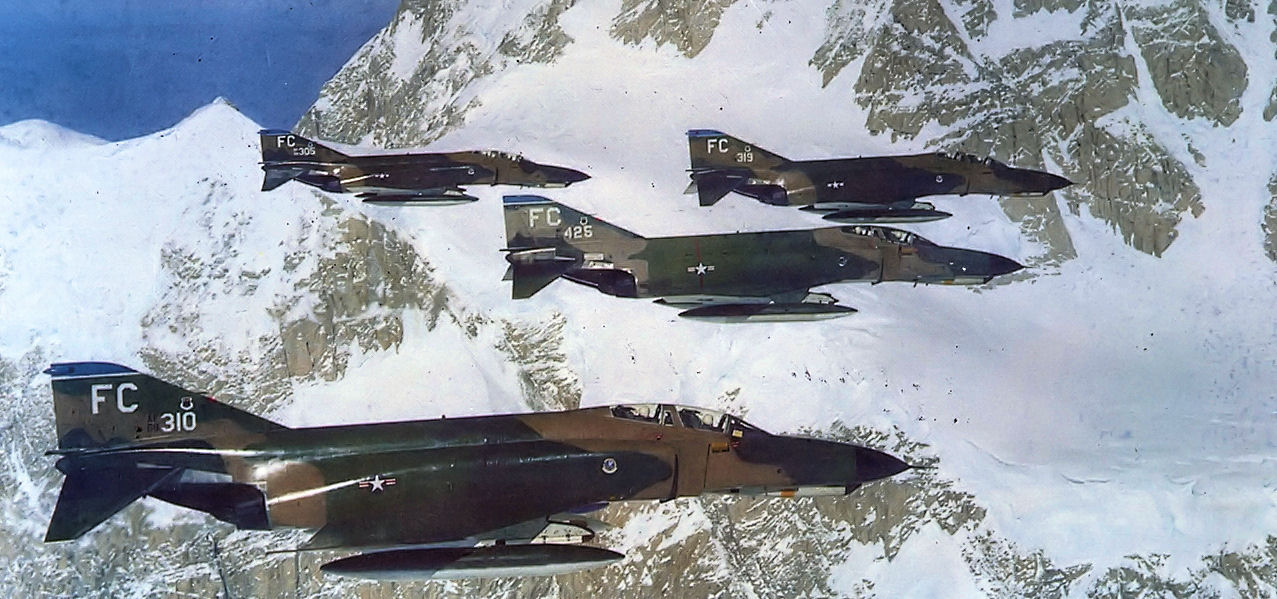
43rd Tactical Fighter Squadron F-4Es at Mount McKinley.

The technologically outdated F-102s were starting to become ineffective against Soviet Air Forces intruders, resulting in Alaska Air Command to try to upgrade them to more advanced F-4 Phantom IIs, however Tactical Air Command and Pacific Air Forces fighter squadrons tasked for the Vietnam War got first priority. Air Defense Command augmented Alaska Air Command by sending squadrons equipped with the Convair F-106 Delta Dart to Alaska on a rotational basis. In 1969, due to the age of their F-102 fighters, the 317th Fighter-Interceptor Squadron was inactivated. In 1970 the 43rd Tactical Fighter Squadron was assigned to the 21st Composite Wing and equipped with advanced McDonnell Douglas F-4E Phantom II. The 43rd Tactical Fighter Squadron, despite mechanical issues due to the Alaskan winter, also assumed the close air support mission role in support of the Army. Despite these issues the 43rd Tactical Fighter Squadron proved itself, conducting combat alerts, intercepts against Soviet Air Forces intruders, and combat exercises. In June 1972 the 43rd Tactical Fighter Squadron sent a detachment to Operation Cool Shoot at Tyndall Air Force Base, Florida and was awarded the Hughes Achievement Trophy in December of that year. 21 CW continued to compete in exercised during 1976, including Jack Frost, the Tactical Air Command Weapons System Evaluation Program at Eglin Air Force Base, Florida, and the William Tell fighter weapons competition in October and November at Tyndall AFB, where the 21st Composite Wing won the awards for the best F-4 crew, best maintenance crew, the Apple Splitter award for most drones destroyed, and the Top Gun award. 43 TFS won the Hughes Achievement Trophy again in 1977 and went to the Canadian Forces Air Command's Maple Flag in September 1978 and U.S. Air Force's Red Flag in April 1979.

In 1975 the 21st Composite Wing was divested of its helicopter and transport forces and inactivated the 5021st Helicopter Squadron, which were realigned under Military Airlift Command across the Air Force, however the 21 CW gained two airbase wings and responsibility for all of Alaska's air control and missile and space warning sites.

In 1977 the 343rd Tactical Fighter Group and 18th Tactical Fighter Squadron, equipped with F-4Es, was activated under the 21st Composite Wing. The 43rd Tactical Fighter Squadron was moved to the 343rd Tactical Fighter Group as well. The 18th Tactical Fighter Squadron assumed responsibility for close air support, while the 43rd Tactical Fighter Squadron specialized in the air defense mission. In October 1977 the 5041 Tactical Operations Squadron was inactivated as well.

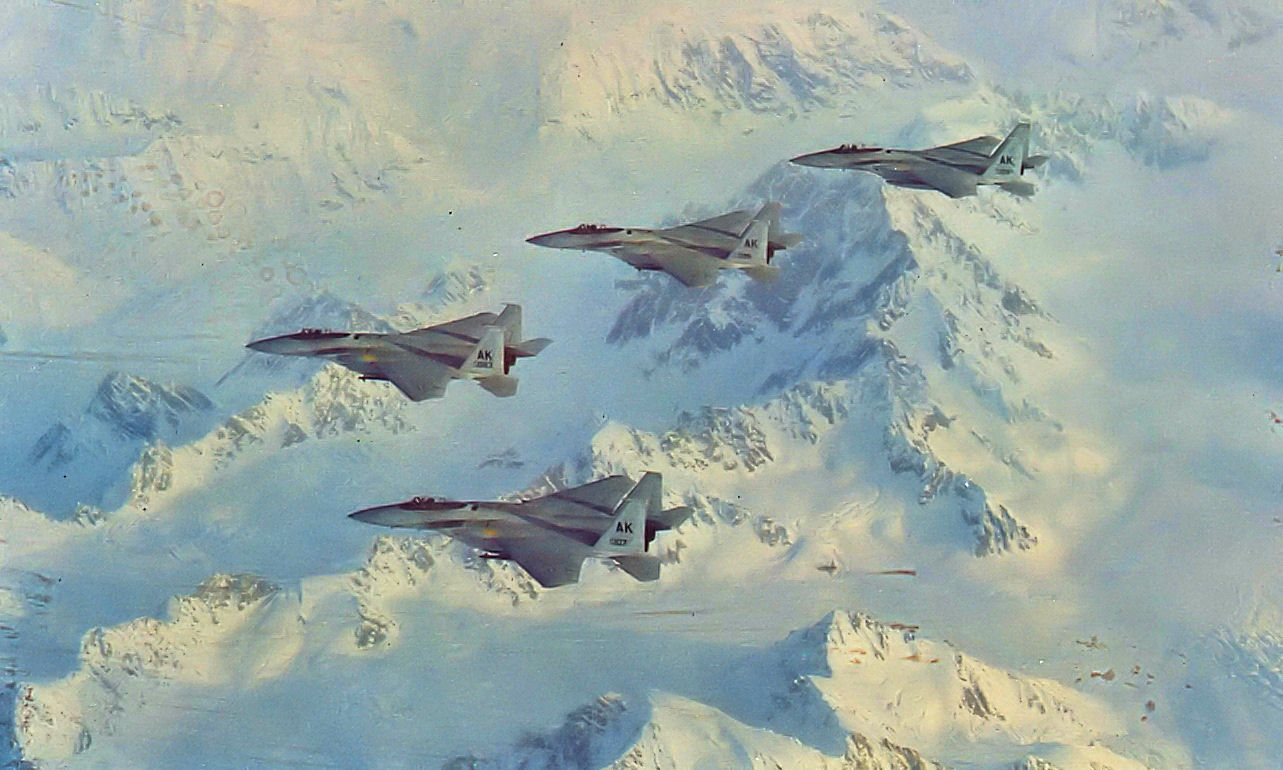
43rd Tactical Fighter Squadron F-15s over Alaska Range

On 1 October 1979 the 21st Composite Wing was redesignated as the 21st Tactical Fighter Wing (21 TFW), reorganizing it along the lines of a standard tactical fighter wing in response to a study initiated by its commander, Colonel Michael Nelson. All of the aircraft from the composite wing were dispersed to other units, except for its 40 F-4E fighters, 12 T-33 trainers, and a Beechcraft C-12 Huron. The F-4Es remained with the 43rd Tactical Fighter Squadron and 18th Tactical Fighter Squadron, while the T-33s and C-12 were assigned to the newly activated 5021st Tactical Operations Squadron. F-4Es from the 21st Tactical Fighter Wing deployed to Chongju Air Base, South Korea to participate in Exercise Team Spirit with the Republic of Korea Air Force. The 21st Tactical Fighter Wing also practiced dissimilar air combat training starting in March 1980, while also conducting combat air patrols, air interdiction operations, and composite force tactics training.

In March 1980, the 21st Tactical Fighter Wing received its first McDonnell Douglas F-15A Eagles for the 43rd Tactical Fighter Squadron. The 18th Tactical Squadron was moved to the 343rd Composite Wing, where it was equipped with A-10 Thunderbolt II ground attack planes. The 21st Tactical Fighter Wing became the first unit in the Air Force to reach Initial Operitonal Capability on the F-15 without any outside assistance. On 24 November 1982 it made its first intercept with the F-15A Eagle, intercepting a Soviet Air Forces Tupolev Tu-95. 21 TFW F-15s conducted several deployments and exercises, such as United States Readiness Command's arctic exercise Brim Frost, the 1985 Team Spirit exercises with the Republic of Korea Air Force and Japan Air Self Defense Force, and numerous training exercises with the Canadian Forces Air Command. Three F-15As of the 21st Tactical Fighter Wing also became the first Alaskan single-seat fighters to circle the North Pole.

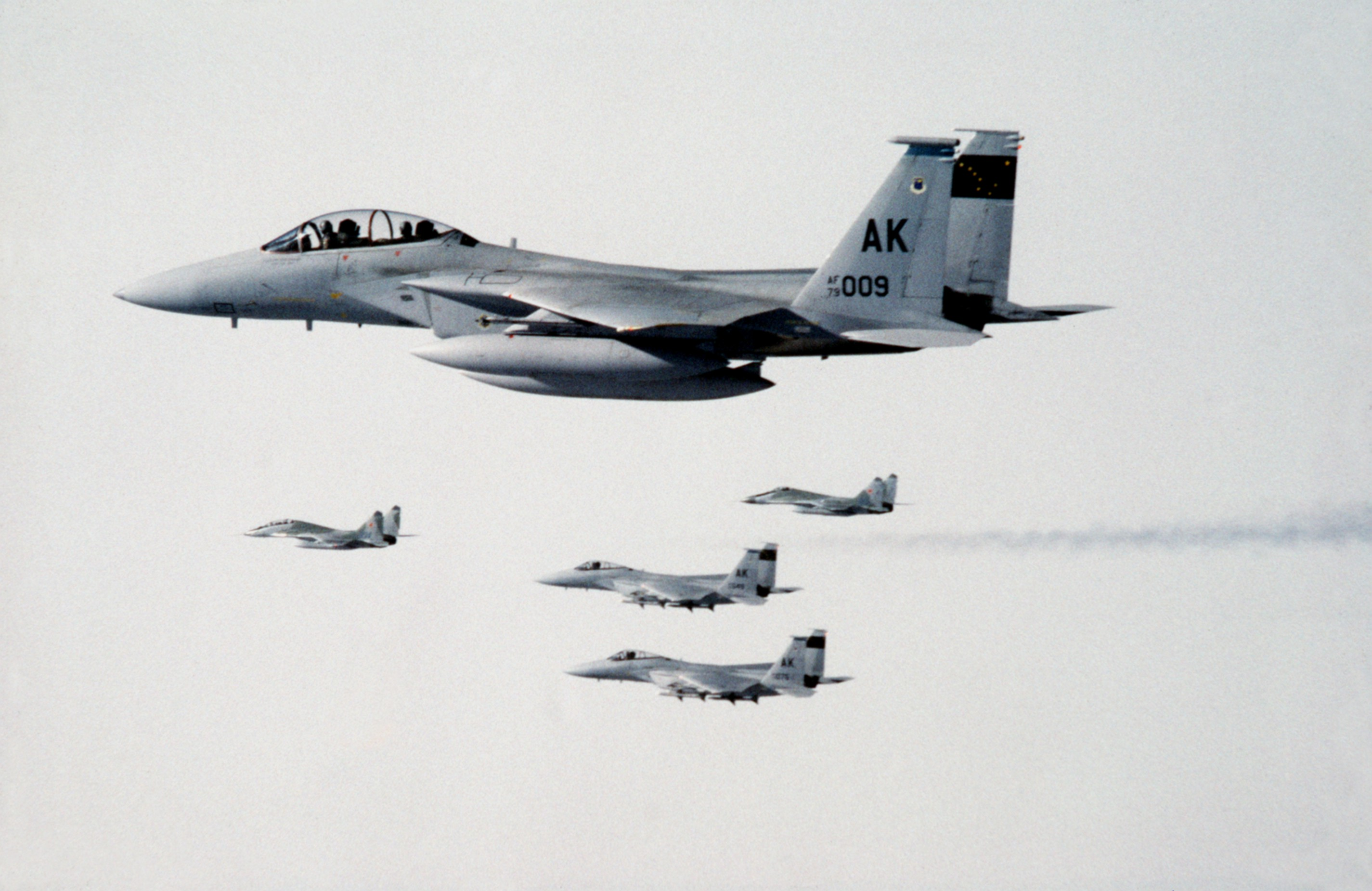
43rd Tactical Fighter Squadron F-15s escort Soviet Air Forces MiG-29s on their visit to America.

In May 1987, the 21st Tactical Fighter Wing received its first F-15C and F-15D Eagles, with the D variants replacing the T-33 as the unit's trainer and resulting in the inactivation of the 5021 Tactical Operations Squadron in 1988. The 21st Tactical Fighter Wing also hosted numerous dignitaries, such as President George H. W. Bush on his way to the state funeral of the Emperor of Japan Hirohito. In 1989, F-15Cs of the 21st Tactical Fighter Wing escorted the first two Soviet Air Forces Mikoyan MiG-29s to attend an airshow in North America.

In 1990, Alaskan Air Command became Pacific Air Forces' Eleventh Air Force. In May 1991, the 21st Tactical Fighter Wing activated the 90th Tactical Fighter Squadron which was equipped with McDonnell Douglas F-15E Strike Eagle strike fighters.

In 1991 the Air Force directed the implementation of the one wing, one base policy resulting in the redesignation of the 21st Tactical Fighter Wing as the 21st Wing (21 WG) on 26 September 1991, in preparation for its inactivation on 19 December 1991. Its flying units were consolidated under the 3rd Wing.

=== 21st Space Wing (1992–present) ===
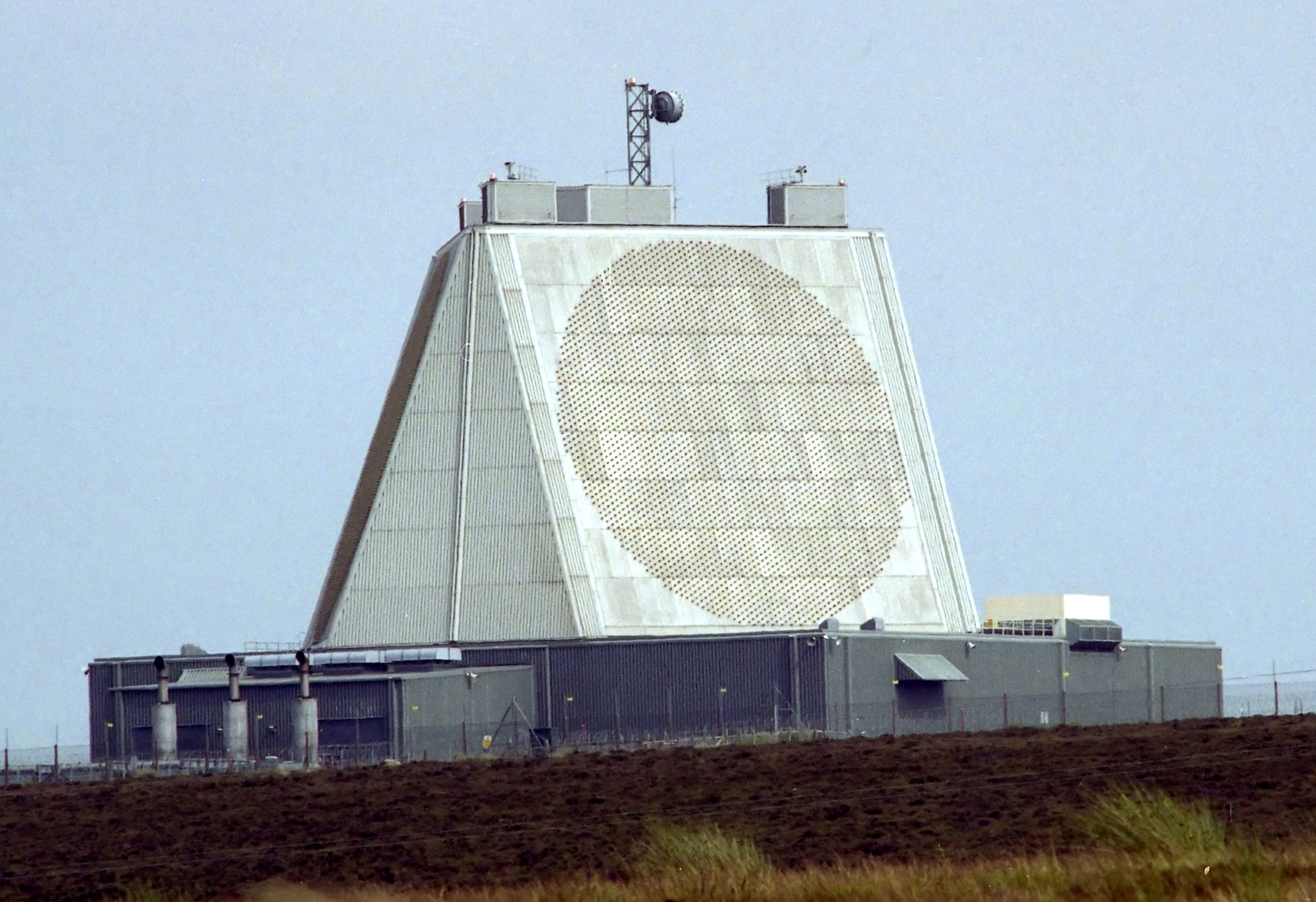
Solid State Phased Array Radar (SSPAR) at RAF Fylingdales, England

On 15 May 1992, the 21st Space Wing (21 SW) was reactivated at Peterson Air Force Base, Colorado and assigned to Air Force Space Command. The 21st Space Wing replaced Air Force Space Command's 1st Space Wing, which managed ground and space-based sensors, and the 3rd Space Support Wing, which was the host wing for Peterson Air Force Base and Cheyenne Mountain Air Force Station. Replacing the 1st Space Wing and 3rd Space Support Wing with the 21st Space Wing was part of a larger Air Force initiative designed to preserve early Air Force flying heritage, and bestowed upon the 21st Space Wing the history and honors of the World War II-era 21st Fighter Group and 21st Bombardment Group. On 20 September 1993, the 21st Space Wing was assigned to the Air Force Space Command's Fourteenth Air Force.

The 21st Space Wing's primary mission was missile warning, which was conducted via terrestrial and space-based sensors operated by the 21st Operations Group. The 2nd Space Warning Squadron, based at Buckley Air National Guard Base, and the 5th Space Warning Squadron, based Woomera Air Station, Australia, flew the Defense Support Program infra-red missile launch detection satellites. The 4th Space Warning Squadron, stationed at Holloman Air Force Base, operated the Defense Support Program's Mobile Ground Station, before having its mission transferred to the Air National Guard's 137th Space Warning Squadron in 1997. On 1 October 1994 the 11th Space Warning Squadron was activated at Falcon Air Force Base to provide accurate and timely missile warning to theater forces through the Attack and Launch Early Reporting to Theater (ALERT) system.

In addition to these space systems, the 21st Space Wing operated a number of terrestrial radar sites, spread across the world. The 6th Space Warning Squadron, stationed at Cape Cod Air Force Station, 7th Space Warning Squadron, stationed at Beale Air Force Base, 8th Space Warning Squadron, stationed at Eldorado Air Force Station, and 9th Space Warning Squadron, stationed at Robins Air Force Base all operated the Phased Array Warning System (PAVE PAWS), which had been in operation since the 1980s. The 10th Space Warning Squadron, stationed at Cavalier Air Force Station, operated the Perimeter Acquisition Radar Characterization System (PARCS), which served as part of the sea launched ballistic missile warning network for the Arctic region. The 12th Space Warning Squadron, stationed at Thule Air Base, Greenland, 13th Space Warning Squadron, stationed at Clear Air Force Station, Alaska, and a British detachment out of RAF Fylingdales operated the Ballistic Missile Early Warning System (BMEWS) radar network. The Ballistic Missile Early Warning System had been in operation since the 1960s, and was updated to the Solid State Phased Array Radar System (SSPAR), which became operational at Thule Air Base in 1987, RAF Fylingdales in 1992, and at Clear Air Force Station in 2001. Due to budgetary reasons the 8th Space Warning Squadron and 9th Space Warning Squadron, and there radar systems, were inactivated in July 1995.

In April 1995, the 21st Space Wing gained the 721st Space Group, which would later be redesignated the 721st Support Group, and in 2002 the 721st Mission Support Group, which oversaw operations at Cheyenne Mountain Air Force Station. On 26 April 1995, the 73rd Space Group, which was stationed at Falcon Air Force Base and conducted space surveillance operations, was inactivated and its mission was assumed by the 21st Space Wing. The assimilation of the 73rd Space Wing brought a number of space surveillance units into the 21st Space Wing. The 19th Space Surveillance Squadron, which was stationed at Pirinclik Air Force Station and operated the AN/FPS-79 radar to monitory space and missile launches from the former Soviet Union, Russian Federation, and Middle East. 19 SPSS, through earlier units, had monitored space and missile launches from the Soviet Union starting in 1955, including the launches of Sputnik 1 and Vostok 1. The 20th Space Surveillance Squadron, stationed at Eglin Air Force Base, operated the AN/FPS-85 radar, which was Air Force Space Command's first electronically steered radar. The 21st Space Wing also inherited the Ground-Based Electro-Optical Deep Space Surveillance System from the 73rd Space Group, which it operated through Detachment 1 at Socorro, New Mexico, Detachment 2 at Naval Support Facility Diego Garcia, and Detachment 3 at the Air Force Maui Optical and Supercomputing observatory, which conducted deep-space surveillance and space-object identification. Detachment 4 was activated at Morón Air Base, Spain to operate the Transportable Optical System (TOS) in September 1998, and was renamed the Morón Optical Surveillance System (MOSS) in April 1999. Morón would receive the El Raven telescope in November 2005 and the RO4 high-volume superior resolution camera in June 2006 to enhance its space control mission. The 3rd Space Surveillance Squadron, stationed at Misawa Air Base, Japan and the 5th Space Surveillance Squadron, stationed at RAF Feltwell operated the Deep Space Tracking System (DSTS). The 1st Space Surveillance Squadron, stationed at Griffiss Air Force Base, the 4th Space Surveillance Squadron, stationed at Lackland Air Force Base, 17th Space Surveillance Squadron, stationed at RAF Edzell, and Detachment 1, stationed at Osan Air Base, South Korea operated the Low Altitude Space Surveillance System (LASS). The 21st Space Wing also inherited a number of command and control units, including the included the 721st Mobile Command and Control Squadron, which operated the mobile command and control center, 1st Command and Control Squadron, which was at Cheyenne Mountain Air Force Station and tasked the worldwide space surveillance network and maintained the space catalog, 2nd Command and Control Squadron, which was stationed at Schriever Air Force Base and supported the passive space surveillance network, and the 3rd Command and Control Squadron, which was stationed at Offutt Air Force Base and was the alternate missile warning center.

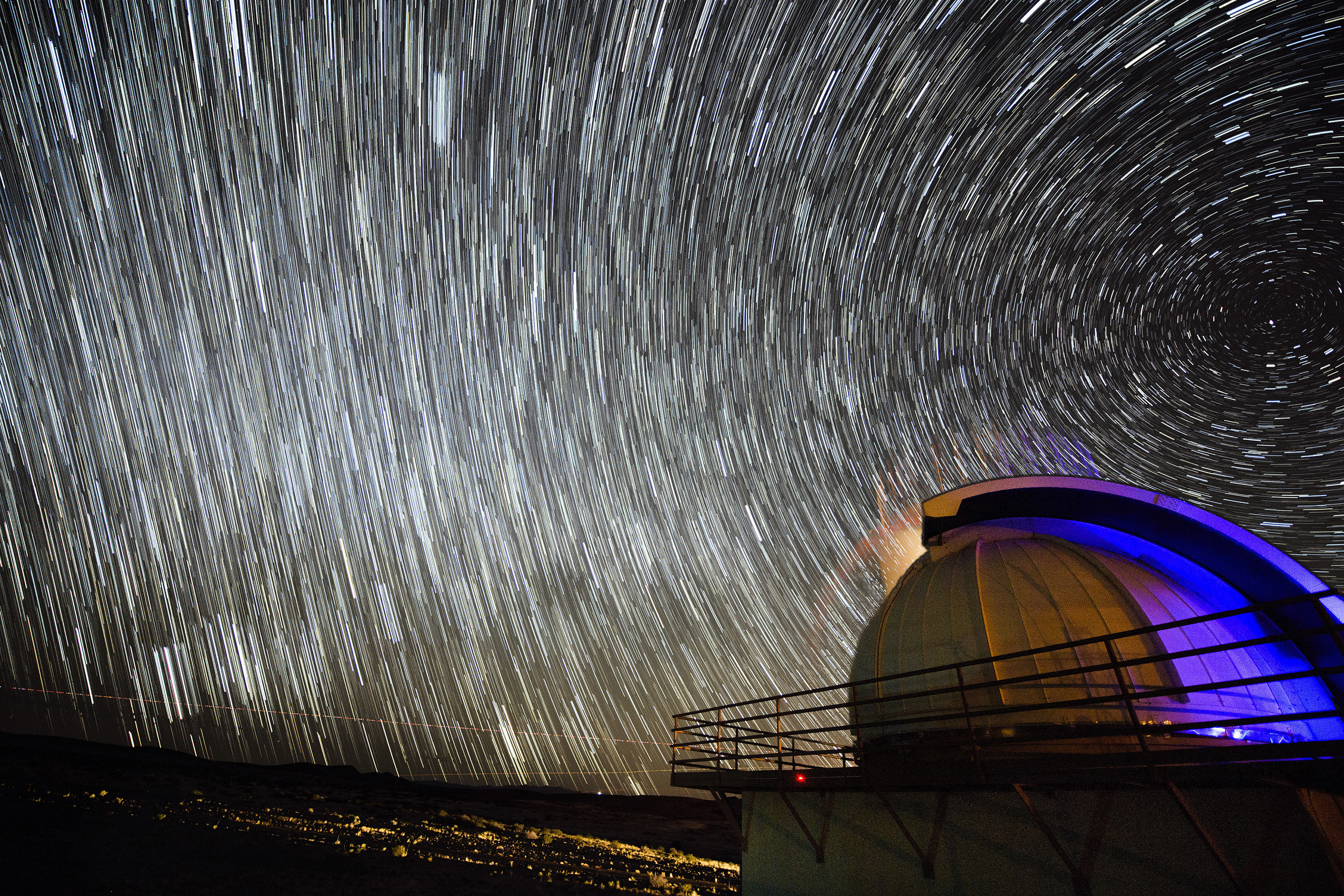
United States Space Surveillance Network telescope.

Due to the obsolescence of passive radar systems, the Deep Space Tracking System and Low Altitude Space Surveillance System was decommission, with 1 SPSS inactivating in 1995, 17 SPSS inactivating in 1996, Detachment 1 at Osan AB inactivating in 1997, 5 SPSS inactivating in January 2002, and 3 SPSS inactivating in February 2002. 19 SPSS and its Turkish radar site was inactivated in 1999. The 721st Mobile Command and Control Squadron was inactivated in 1998, but reactivated as the 153d Command and Control Squadron in support of United States Strategic Command. 2 CACS transferred to 14th Air Force in 1998. 3 CACS was inactivated in 1999 as the upgrades of Cheyenne Mountain Operations Center removed the need for an alternate missile warning center. In June 2008 1 CACS was realigned under the 614th Air and Space Operations Center.

In 1996, the 821st Space Group at Buckley Air National Guard Base was activated under the 21st Space Wing, to run the Defense Support Program satellites, separate from the 21st Operations Group. The Defense Support Program began to draw down as the 821st Space Group transitioned to the Space-Based Infrared System, resulting in the inactivation of the 5th Space Warning Squadron. The 21st Space Wing also lost its last renaming aviation mission with the transition of the 84th Airlift Flight and its Learjet C-21 transports to Air Mobility Command in 1997. In an attempt to achieve greater efficiencies the 21st Medical Group was inactivated and reassigned to the United States Air Force Academy as the 10th Medical Group in 1998.

During the September 11 attacks the 21st Space Wing went to a heightened alert, closing the blast doors at the Cheyenne Mountain Complex for the first time in history. The 21st Space Wing also deployed space forces across the world in support of Operation Enduring Freedom. In May 2001 the 11th Space Warning Squadron was reassigned from the 821st Operations Group to the 21st Operations Group and inactivated in September 2001. The 821st Operations Group and its three remaining component squadrons were inactivated in October 2001, with elements moving to the newly created 460th Air Base Wing, which oversaw Buckley Air Force Base, having transitioned from the Air National Guard to Air Force Space Command in October 2000. The activation of the 460 ABW saw 21 SW cease to be Buckley AFB's host wing. In December 2001, 2 SWS achieved initial operation capability on the Space Based Infrared System. In August 2004, the 21st Space Wing transitioned the Defense Support Program and Space Based Infrared System to the 460th Space Wing, ending the 21st Space Wing's spaceflight mission.

The 21st Space Wing began to focus more on counter-space capabilities, assuming the space control mission. In 2000, it activated the 76th Space Operations Squadron, which operated the Counter Communications System, achieving initial operational capability in September 2004. The 76th Space Operations Squadron was redesignated the 76th Space Control Squadron in recognition of its mission in January 2001, and all former space surveillance squadrons were redesignated as space control squadrons on 1 March 2003. The 4th Space Control Squadron began transitioning into the space control mission in July 2005, activating its first counter communications system in April 2006. In July 2014, 4 SPCS relocated from Holloman AFB to Peterson AFB and consolidated with 76 SPCS into a single squadron, which assumed the name 4th Space Control Squadron. The 16th Space Control Squadron was activated as a defensive space control unit in May 2007 at Peterson AFB.

As the space control mission grew, so did the requirement for space situational awareness. To this end, the four detachments of the 21st Operations Group, worked with the 20th Space Control Squadron at Eglin Air Force Base, 20 SPCS' Detachment 1 at Dahlgren, Virginia, and the Globus II at Vardø, Norway. In June 2002 the 821st Air Base Group was activated to provide base support at Thule Air Base, Greenland, freeing the 12th Space Warning Squadron to focus entirely on its operational mission. On 1 October 2002, the 21st Space Wing was aligned along the standard combat wing structure, redesignated the 21st Support Group as the 21st Mission Support Group and the 721st Support Group as the 721st Mission Support Group. On the same day it activated the 21st Maintenance Group and 21st Logistics Readiness Squadron. It also regained control of the 21st Medical Group from the Air Force Academy in October 2003, expanding it with the activation of the 21st Dental Squadron in July 2005 and the 21st Medical Squadron in June 2012. In February 2004, the 721st Civil Engineer Squadron was inactivated, but later was reactivated in June 2012.

As part of the Air Force's manpower reductions, in July 2004 the 18th Space Control Squadron was inactivated and its detachments were realigned under the 21st Operations Group. In August 2004, Detachment 1, 20th Space Control Squadron, was activated in order to operate the Navy Space System and Alternate Space Control Center. As art of Program Budget Decision 720 the 21st Maintenance Group was inactivated in May 2008. The 21st Communications Squadron was transferred to the 21st Mission Support Group, while other elements were moved into the 21st Operations Group or the 21st Space Wing Director of Staff. Elements of the 21st Mission Support Group also experienced changes, as the 21st Mission Support Squadron was redesignated as the 21st Force Support Squadron, and the 21st Services Squadron merged into the 21st Force Support Squadron on 15 July 2008 as part of a larger Air Force restructuring. Detachment 1, 20 SPCS at Dahlgren inactivated in April 2010, and Detachment 4, 21 OG at Morón AB inactivated in March 2013.

In April 2013, the 13th Space Warning Squadron began oversight of the Cobra Dane radar site in Alaska. Members of the 21st Space Wing were deployed to support Operation Enduring Freedom and Operation Inherent Resolve. These included Airman First Class Matthew Seidler, a member of the 21st Civil Engineering Squadron, Explosive Ordinance Disposal Flight, who was killed in action on 5 January 2012 and Captain David Lyon, an officer of the 21st Logistics Readiness Squadron and member of the United States Air Force Academy's class of 2008, was killed in Afghanistan on 27 December 2013.

The 21st Space Wing also earned numerous awards, including the General Robert T. Herres Award for Best Space Wing in and General Thomas S. Moorman Jr. Award for Air Force Space Command's Best Operational Wing in 2013. The 21st Space Wing also made increased strides in activating the new Space Fence and Long Range Discrimination Radar. Detachment 4, 21st Operations Group was activated on 8 December 2015, while the remaining GEODSS 21 OG detachments transferred to the 20th Space Control Squadron on 20 April 2016. On 22 July 2016 the 18th Space Control Squadron was reactivated at Vandenberg Air Force Base.

On 20 December 2019, the 21st Space Wing, along with the rest of Air Force Space Command became part of the United States Space Force. The Fourteenth Air Force was redesignated as Space Operations Command, which the 21st Space Wing remained assigned to. On 21 Oct 2020, Space Operations Command was redesignated back to Fourteenth Air Force and returned to the United States Air Force. On the same day, Space Operations Command (formerly, Air Force Space Command) was activated on 21 Oct 2020. On 24 July 2020, the 21st Space Wing was inactivated for a final time, being replaced by the Peterson-Schriever Garrison, while its space domain awareness units were reassigned to Space Delta 2, the 73 Space Group became Space Delta 3, responsible for electronic warfare, and its missile warning squadrons were transferred to Space Delta 4, which used to be the 460th Operations Group at Buckley AFB.

== Commanders ==
=== Commander, 21st Fighter-Bomber Wing ===
No.	Commander		Term		
No.	Portrait	Name	Took office	Left office	Duration
1	James B. Buck	Colonel; James B. Buck	1 January 1953	27 April 1953	116 days
2	Robert R. Rowland	Colonel; Robert R. Rowland	27 April 1953	29 June 1956	3 years, 63 days
3	Robert N. Baker	Colonel; Robert N. Baker	29 June 1956	8 February 1958	1 year, 224 days

=== Commander, 21st Tactical Fighter Wing ===
No.	Commander		Term		
No.	Portrait	Name	Took office	Left office	Duration
1	Frank J. Collins	Colonel; Frank J. Collins	1 July 1958	21 April 1959	294 days
2	William W. Ingenhutt	Colonel; William W. Ingenhutt	21 April 1959	28 September 1959	221 days
3	Dean Davenport	Colonel; Dean Davenport	28 September 1959	18 June 1960	203 days

=== Commander, 21st Composite Wing ===
No.	Commander		Term		
No.	Portrait	Name	Took office	Left office	Duration
1	Donald H. Lynch	Colonel; Donald H. Lynch	8 July 1966	30 June 1968	1 year, 358 days
2	Charles W. Johnson, Jr.	Colonel; Charles W. Johnson, Jr.	30 June 1968	23 September 1969	1 year, 146 days
3	Kenneth D. Dunaway	Colonel; Kenneth D. Dunaway	23 September 1969	15 January 1970	53 days
4	John A. Nelson	Colonel; John A. Nelson	15 January 1970	1 September 1970	290 days
5	Kenneth D. Dunaway	Colonel; Kenneth D. Dunaway	1 September 1970	23 July 1971	264 days
6	James R. Larkins	Colonel; James R. Larkins	23 July 1971	9 August 1971	17 days
7	James R. Brickel	Colonel; James R. Brickel	9 August 1971	12 July 1972	338 days
8	David T. Stockman	Colonel; David T. Stockman	12 July 1972	4 June 1973	327 days
9	Charles F. Loyd	Colonel; Charles F. Loyd	4 June 1973	1 July 1974	1 year, 27 days
10	Fredrick C. Eaton	Colonel; Fredrick C. Eaton	1 July 1974	1 July 1975	1 year, 0 days
11	Edward L. Tixier	Colonel; Edward L. Tixier	1 July 1975	29 April 1977	1 year, 302 days
12	John T. Wotring	Colonel; John T. Wotring	29 April 1977	16 April 1979	1 year, 352 days
13	Michael A. Nelson	Colonel; Michael A. Nelson	16 April 1979	1 October 1979	168 days

=== Commander, 21st Tactical Fighter Wing ===
No.	Commander		Term		
No.	Portrait	Name	Took office	Left office	Duration
1	Michael A. Nelson	Colonel; Michael A. Nelson	1 October 1979	20 February 1981	1 year, 142 days
2	Jerry D. Cobb	Colonel; Jerry D. Cobb	20 February 1981	15 April 1982	1 year, 54 days
-	Robert W. Hibarger	Colonel; Robert W. Hibarger; Acting	15 April 1982	22 April 1982	7 days
3	Evan J. Griffith, Jr.	Colonel; Evan J. Griffith, Jr.	22 April 1982	16 April 1984	2 years, 1 day
4	Wilfred K. Abbott	Colonel; Wilfred K. Abbott	16 April 1984	10 July 1984	55 days
5	Pat R. Paxton	Colonel; Pat R. Paxton	10 July 1984	19 March 1985	282 days
6	William R. Povilus	Colonel; William R. Povilus	19 March 1985	17 October 1986	1 year, 212 days
7	Stuart L. Alton	Colonel; Stuart L. Alton	17 October 1986	23 August 1988	1 year, 311 days
9	Harold S. Storer, Jr.	Colonel; Harold S. Storer, Jr.	23 August 1988	20 March 1990	1 year, 209 days
10	Donald J. Creighton	Colonel; Donald J. Creighton	20 March 1990	26 September 1991	1 year, 251 days

=== Commander, 21st Wing ===
No.	Commander		Term		
No.	Portrait	Name	Took office	Left office	Duration
1	Rodney P. Kelly	Colonel; Rodney P. Kelly; Acting	26 September 1991	20 December 1991	24 days
2	Donald J. Creighton	Colonel; Donald J. Creighton	20 December 1991	2 February 1992	44 days

=== Commander, 21st Space Wing ===
No.	Commander		Term		
No.	Portrait	Name	Took office	Left office	Duration
1	Ronald D. Gray	Brigadier General; Ronald D. Gray	15 May 1992	1 September 1993	1 year, 109 days
2	Donald G. Cook	Brigadier General; Donald G. Cook	1 September 1993	10 January 1995	1 year, 131 days
3	Gerald F. Perryman Jr.	Brigadier General; Gerald F. Perryman Jr.	10 January 1995	7 June 1996	1 year, 149 days
4	Franklin J. Blaisdell	Brigadier General; Franklin J. Blaisdell	7 June 1996	19 June 1998	2 years, 12 days
5	Jerry M. Drennan	Brigadier General; Jerry M. Drennan	19 June 1998	22 August 2000	2 years, 64 days
6	C. Robert Kehler	Brigadier General; C. Robert Kehler	22 August 2000	15 May 2002	1 year, 266 days
7	Duane W. Deal	Brigadier General; Duane W. Deal	15 May 2002	11 March 2004	1 year, 301 days
8	Richard E. Webber	Brigadier General; Richard E. Webber	11 March 2004	10 November 2005	1 year, 244 days
9	Jay G. Santee	Colonel; Jay G. Santee	10 November 2005	28 June 2007	1 year, 230 days
10	John W. Raymond	Colonel; John W. Raymond	28 June 2007	20 August 2009	2 years, 53 days
11	Stephen N. Whiting	Colonel; Stephen N. Whiting	20 August 2009	28 June 2011	1 year, 312 days
12	Chris D. Crawford	Colonel; Chris D. Crawford	28 June 2011	26 July 2013	2 years, 28 days
13	John E. Shaw	Brigadier General; John E. Shaw	26 July 2013	12 June 2015	1 year, 321 days
14	Douglas A. Schiess	Colonel; Douglas A. Schiess	12 June 2015	11 July 2017	2 years, 29 days
15	Todd R. Moore	Colonel; Todd R. Moore	11 July 2017	10 July 2019	1 year, 364 days
16	Thomas G. Falzarano	Colonel; Thomas G. Falzarano	10 July 2019	12 May 2020	307 days
17	Sam Johnson	Colonel; Sam Johnson	12 May 2020	24 July 2020	73 days
