= AN/FPQ-16 PARCS =

United States Space Force phased-array radar system

AN/FPQ-16
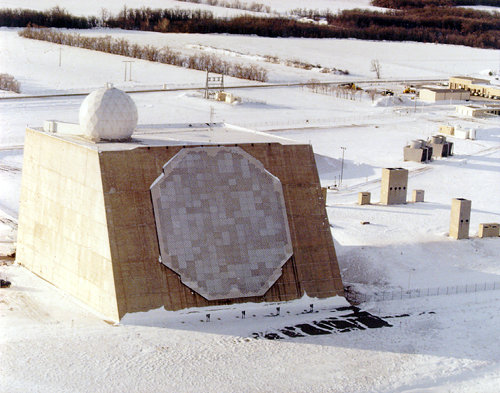
- PARCS at Cavalier Space Force Station
- Country of origin: United States
- Manufacturer: General Electric
- Introduced: 1975; 51 years ago
- No. built: 1
- Type: Passive electronically scanned array
- Range: 2,000 mi (3,200 km)

The AN/FPQ-16 Perimeter Acquisition Radar Attack Characterization System (PARCS) is a powerful United States Space Force passive electronically scanned array radar system located in North Dakota. It is the second most powerful phased array radar system in the US Space Force's fleet of missile warning and space surveillance systems, behind the more modern PAVE PAWS phased array radar.

PARCS was built by General Electric as the Perimeter Acquisition Radar (PAR), part of the US Army's Safeguard Program anti-ballistic missile system. PAR provided early warning of incoming ICBMs at ranges up to 2,000 miles (3,200 km), feeding data to the interceptor station, equipped with a shorter-range radar. The PAR and other systems were collectively known as the Stanley R. Mickelsen Safeguard Complex. With the signing of the ABM Treaty in 1972, the U.S. was limited to a single ABM base protecting missile fields. A second partially completed PAR in Montana, about 60 miles (97 km) north of Great Falls, between Conrad and Chester, near Tiber Reservoir, was abandoned in-place. In 1975 the House Appropriations Committee voted to close Mickelsen and shut down Safeguard, which occurred in July 1976.

After Mickelsen was shut down, the Air Force's Aerospace Defense Command took over the PAR site re-activating it in 1977 in the early warning role. It was later transferred to Strategic Air Command. The site was known as the Concrete Missile Early Warning System (CMEWS) after the nearby town of Concrete. But when that town's post office closed in 1983 it became Cavalier Air Force Station, renamed Cavalier Space Force Station in 2021. The satellite tracking role was later added, and in that mission PARCS monitors and tracks over half of all earth-orbiting objects. PARCS was initially slated for closure in 1992, but was instead upgraded with newer electronics to become EPARCs.

EPARCS is operated by the 10th Space Warning Squadron, Space Delta 4, and maintained by Summit Technical Solutions, LLC. In addition to contractors, NORAD has U.S. and Canadian military members assigned to the facility.

== Description ==
In accordance with the Joint Electronics Type Designation System (JETDS), the "AN/FPQ-16" designation represents the 16th design of an Army-Navy electronic device for fixed ground radar special or combination equipment. The JETDS system also now is used to name all Department of Defense electronic systems.

=== Radar ===
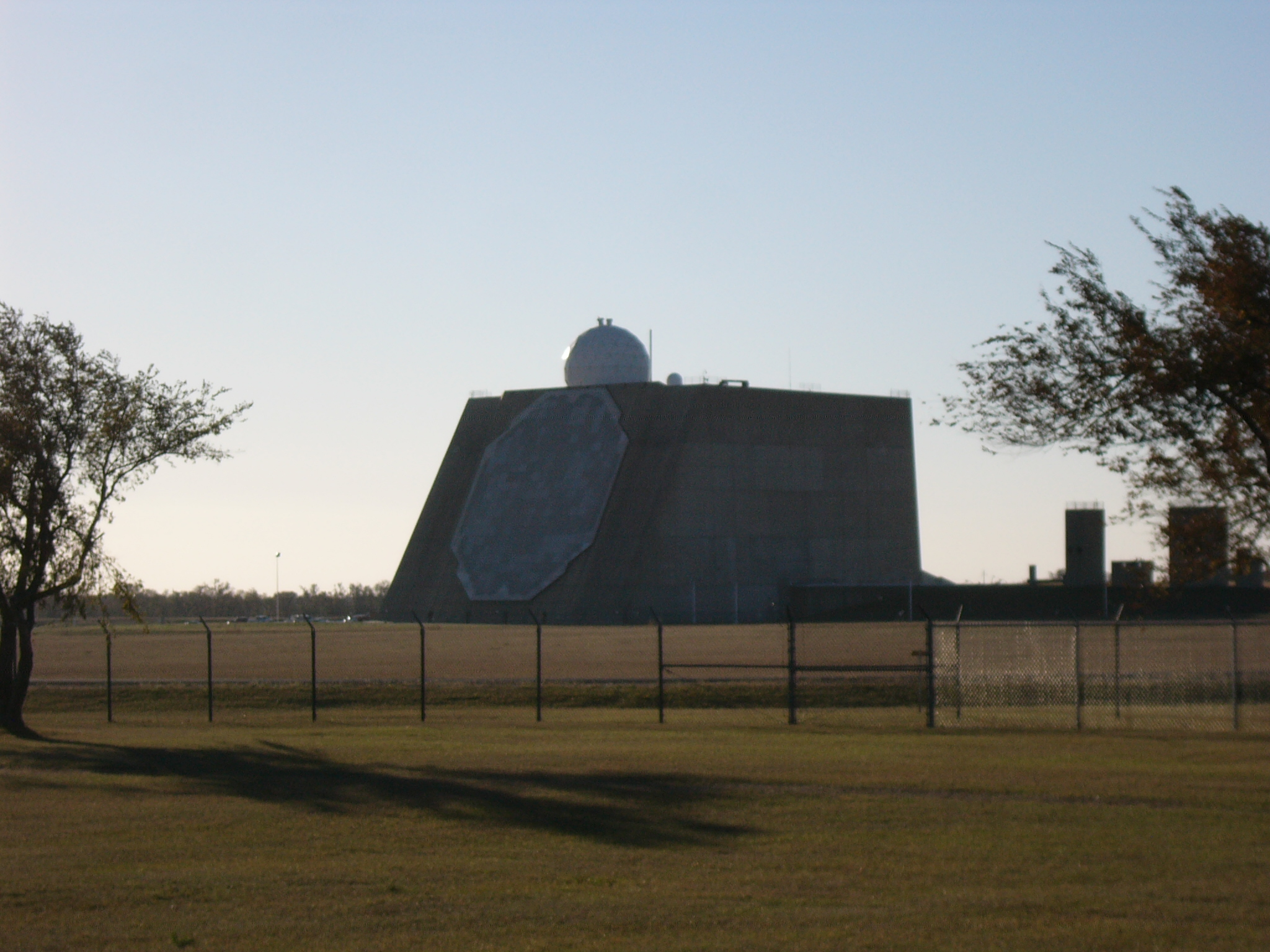
PARCS seen from the north-west. The main antenna is centered. The radome on the roof protects a satellite communications antenna. The buildings on the right contain the power plant.

The PAR could originally acquire an object the size of a basketball 9.4 inches (24 cm) at 2,100 mi (3,300 km), e.g., a warhead from a submarine-launched ballistic missile launched in Hudson Bay; and the resolution at similar range was enhanceable to less than 3.5 inches (9 cm). Original PAR equipment included:

- a Beam Forming Network (BFN), the phased array of 6,888 elements—originally 6,144 GE crossed-dipoles of beryllium copper mounted on the building's sloping wall. Each element consists of a support rod and two crossed dipoles, bent back at 45 degrees to form an arrow head shape.
- a "phase shifter platform" was inside of the PAR Building's sloped wall, Under computer control this shifted the phase of the current feed to the individual antenna elements, allowing the beam to be instantly pointed in any direction. A "microstrip high power UHF phaser" was later developed for the BFN.
- a Beam Steering Computer with Sensor Control System Program for steering/controlling the BFN
- a Beam Power Supply with Power Supply Control set
- a duplex Digital Data Group for timing signals in the electronic equipment
- a Radar Maintenance Console to allow monitoring of antenna beam shape
- a Radar Return Generator for simulation of intermediate frequency (IF) signals into the signal processor's IF input.

=== Other systems ===
In addition to the PAR, the system includes a 14 megawatt electricity system with five, 16 cylinder diesel/natural gas Cooper Bessemer engines for 5 GE generators. A small "antenna measuring radar" with radome was on the building's top which was later replaced by a satellite communications antenna. EPARCS also includes an electrical substation and heat sink.

The PAR Data Processor—with Central Logic and Control including redundant Processor, Program Store, and Variable Store units—provided missile/satellite track data for communications equipment to transfer to NORAD, etc. and was listed as a separate procurement item from the Perimeter Acquisition Radar by the Congressional Record. For the Advanced Data Communication Control Procedure, the ADCCP communication processor invented in the 1980s by Lynn O Kesler "translates messages between" the PARCS data transmission controller and the Cheyenne Mountain Complex.ADCCP communication processor

== History ==
=== MAR ===
The PAR design traces its history to the Nike-X ABM program of the early 1960s. Nike-X was an attempt to address problems with the earlier LIM-49 Nike Zeus ABM system, which could only attack three or four missiles at a time due to its use of mechanically steered radars. The Weapons Systems Evaluation Group predicted that the Zeus system could be penetrated with a 90% probability simply by firing four warheads at it, a small cost to destroy a base that would hold as many as a hundred missiles.

Bell Labs proposed replacing the Zeus radars with a phased array system in 1960, and were given the go-ahead for development in June 1961. The result was the Zeus Multi-function Array Radar (ZMAR), an early example of an active electronically steered array radar system. MAR was made of a large number of small antennas, each one connected to a separate computer-controlled transmitter or receiver. Using a variety of beamforming and signal processing steps, a single MAR was able to perform long-distance detection, track generation, discrimination of warheads from decoys, and tracking of the outbound interceptor missiles.

MAR allowed the entire battle over a wide space to be controlled from a single site. Each MAR, and its associated battle center, would process tracks for hundreds of targets. The system would then select the most appropriate battery for each one, and hand off particular targets for them to attack. One battery would normally be associated with the MAR, while others would be distributed around it. Remote batteries were equipped with a much simpler radar whose primary purpose was to track the outgoing Sprint missiles before they became visible to the potentially distant MAR. These smaller Missile Site Radars (MSR) were passively scanned, forming only a single beam instead of the MAR's multiple beams.

=== PAR ===
The cost of the MAR system was so great that it could only realistically be used at high-value sites like large cities. Smaller cities would be left undefended in the original Nike-X concept. Starting in 1965 some effort was put into the concept of an autonomous Sprint base using a cut-down MAR, TACMAR. Further work led instead to an upgraded MSR, TACMSR. The MSR didn't have the range needed to alert the base in time to respond, which led to the spring 1965 idea of a very long-range early warning radar whose primary purpose was to alert bases around the country. The system had only rudimentary tracking capabilities and no decluttering system, these tasks would be handed off to the radars the PAR alerted. This allowed the radar to have a relatively low resolution, which in turn allowed it to be built using conventional and inexpensive VHF electronics. As the radar would be used only during the opening phases of the attack, it was not hardened against explosions, greatly lowering construction costs.

As the cost of deploying Nike-X began to grow with the increase in Soviet ICBM numbers, the Army and Bell began exploring smaller deployments with more limited missions. Among these was the idea of a much lighter Nike-X system consisting solely of autonomous MSRs and early-warning PARs. This led to contractor studies for the PAR system. Bell Labs completed a specifications document in October 1966, and General Electric won the following development contract in December. Under this model the PAR would not only be used for initial detection, but also help generate accurate tracks so the MSRs would know precisely where to look for their assigned targets. This demanded higher resolution than the original VHF design, although not as high as the MAR's microwave frequencies.

In April 1967 the decision was made to move to UHF frequencies. This would not only allow a reasonably sized radar to offer the required resolution, but also helped with a serious problem known as nuclear blackout, which would render large areas of the sky opaque to radar. This was acceptable for early warning; by the time the warheads were going off the PAR would already have served its purpose, but this would not be acceptable under the cut-down MSR model. It was known that the effect lasted for shorter periods at higher frequencies, so by moving to UHF the PAR would have a clear view more rapidly, without the expense of the microwave-frequency MAR. Experiments at the Prince Albert Radar Laboratory suggested that this would also improve performance in the presence of aurora. However, due to a number of technical factors, this also meant that four times as much power would be required to reach the same detection performance. Some of this cost was offset by the move from separate transmit/receive arrays used on the MAR and early PAR to a single array, a possibility due to the frequencies being used.

=== Nike-X becomes Sentinel ===
As data from high-altitude nuclear tests carried out in 1962 were studied, a new type of anti-warhead attack was developed. Outside the atmosphere the massive amount of X-rays generated by a warhead's explosion can travel long distances, whereas at low altitude they quickly interact with air molecules within a few tens of meters. When these X-rays strike metal they rapidly heat it, causing a shock wave to form that can cause the heat shield on a reentry vehicle to break up. The advantage to this approach is that the effect works over an area on the order of several kilometers, which allows a single missile to attack an incoming warhead in spite of it being protected by a cloud of decoys. In contrast, Sprint and the even earlier Nike Zeus had to explode within about a hundred meters of the target to be effective, which was extremely difficult to arrange at long range, even without decoys.

This led to new studies on systems using an upgraded version of Zeus, originally known as Zeus EX but later renamed LIM-49 Spartan, with range on the order of 400 miles (640 km). These could offer protection across the entire US from a much smaller number of bases than a defense based on Sprint alone. This concept emerged as the Sentinel program, which was effectively, a less-dense, less-expensive, long-range version of Nike-X. In this system, PAR was not only used for early detection and track generation, but was now responsible for long-range guidance of the Spartan as it passed out of the range of the MSRs, requiring further upgrades and making them even more important in the overall battle. The system as a whole also had to have greatly improve data communications as targets would be handed off from radar to radar.

In the end, PAR looked a lot like a less-capable version of the original MAR it had intended to replace. In September 1967, General Electric was given the go-ahead to begin development of a production PAR system.

=== Sentinel becomes Safeguard ===
As strategic balance and budget issues continued to weigh on the decision to deploy an ABM, Sentinel was itself cancelled. On 14 March 1969, President Richard Nixon announced it would be replaced by the Safeguard Program, which would deploy a small number of Sprint-heavy sites around the Air Force's LGM-30 Minuteman missile bases. The idea now was to provide protection to the bases against any attempted sneak attack, ensuring the Minuteman missiles would survive and thus present a credible deterrent force. The decision to deploy the first two of potential twelve sites passed in the Senate in August 1969 by a single vote, that of vice president Spiro Agnew.

Sites were selected for the first two phases of Safeguard deployment, Phase I at Malmstrom AFB in Montana and Grand Forks AFB in North Dakota, and Phase II at Whiteman AFB, Missouri and Warren AFB, Wyoming. Only the Phase I sites required PAR, the Phase II sites would use the Phase I PARs for their early warning. GE released the PAR design for manufacture in early 1970, and the North Dakota site was selected to act as the R&D site for PAR.

=== Construction and closure ===
Construction on PAR-1 in North Dakota began in April 1970, and PAR-2 in Montana in May. Extensive testing was carried out over the next year at GE's Syracuse offices, while the US Army Corps of Engineers installed the heavy equipment. Work continued until August 1972 when the Strategic Arms Limitation Talks (SALT) agreements were signed. As part of SALT, the ABM Treaty required both countries to limit the number of deployment sites protected by an anti-ballistic missile (ABM) system to one each. Work on PAR-2 in Montana stopped, and the partially complete building stands to this day.

Major construction on PAR-1 was completed on 21 August 1972, and test operations commenced. Antenna alignment was completed in August 1973, and the first successful tracking of a satellite and a radio star took place that month. The test period ran for two full years before the official Equipment Readiness Date was declared on 27 September 1974. Through this period, construction on the MSR and missile batteries was continuing, and the entire Mickelsen base reached its Initial Operational Capability (IOC) in April 1975. The complex was declared fully operational on 1 October 1975.

The very next day, the House Appropriations Committee voted to shut down Mickelsen and end the Safeguard program. A follow-up bill in November allowed funds to continue operations at PAR-1. The MSR was shut down in February 1976 and the missiles began to be removed.

=== CMEWS ===
PAR was leased to the US Air Force in September 1977, who began operations in October 1977. The USAF designated the base as the Concrete Missile Early Warning System (CMEWS) after the nearby community of Concrete. When the post office in Concrete closed in 1983, the base was renamed as Cavalier Air Force Station and the radar itself became PARCS. Assigned in 1983 to pass "tactical warning and attack assessment data” from PARCS to the Cheyenne Mountain Complex was the 1st Space Wing's Detachment 5 (1986 10th Missile Warning Sq, 1992 10th Space Warning Squadron).

=== Enhanced PARCS ===
The Enhanced Perimeter Acquisition Radar Attack Characterization System (EPARCS) was established by 1989 (the "AN/FPQ-16" had become a Major Defense Acquisition Program) and was planned to be closed in September 1992. Instead in 1993, ITT Federal Services took over operations and maintenance from PRC, Inc. A Historic American Engineering Record was prepared and deposited with the Library of Congress.

Since receiving a $6.7 million operations, maintenance, and logistics contract in 2003, BAE Systems has maintained the radar and other EPARCS subsystems (an extension was granted in 2012).

Deployment of the Solid State Phased Array Radar System (SSPARS) replaced BMEWS and upgraded AN/FPS-115 PAVE PAWS with solid state power amplifiers (e.g., with a 1987 AN/FPS-120 at Thule); but for the EPARCS with "obsolete radar technology" in 1994 and for Cobra Dane in Alaska, L-3 Communications was contracted to supply 2004-9 TWTs. Late in the 2000s the USAF began upgrading SSPARS to use Boeing AN/FPS-132 Upgraded Early Warning Radars (UEWR)—e.g., replacing the 1992 AN/FPS-126 at RAF Fylingdales. In 2010, a committee assessed the status of the EPARCS Making Sense of Ballistic Missile Defense: An Assessment of Concepts and Systems for U.S. Boost-Phase Missile Defense in Comparison to Other Alternatives and by 1 February 2012, "the USAF embarked on a modernisation programme for its AN/FPQ-16" as with the Clear AFS "UEWR modernization [began] in FY12" for replacing Clear's AN/FPS-123.

After receiving a $35.5 million operations, maintenance, and logistics contract with the Air Force in 2017, Summit Technical Solutions is the current contractor maintaining the radar system.

External images
- phased array under construction with equipment in front (without antenna measuring radar)
- 1972 PAR Building (Time magazine)

== See also ==
- Nuclear weapons and the United States
- PAVE PAWS
- Ballistic Missile Early Warning System
- Missile Defense Alarm System
- Defense Support Program
- United States Space Surveillance Network
- List of radars
- List of military electronics of the United States
