= 9th Space Warning Squadron =

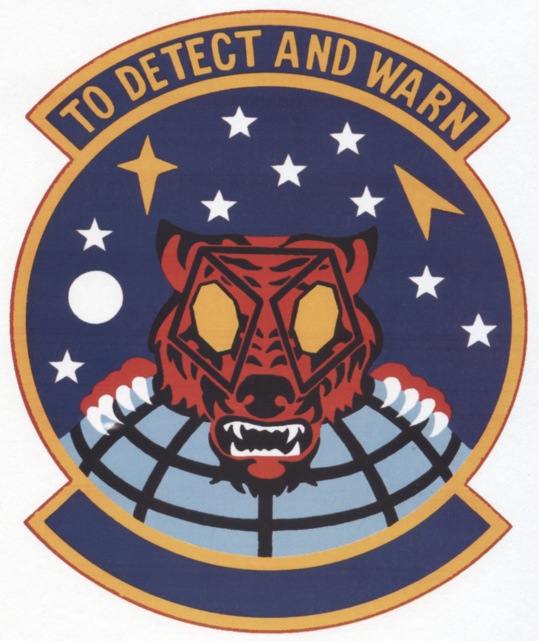
- 9th Space Warning Squadron emblem
- Active: 1986-1995
- Country: United States
- Branch: United States Air Force
- Type: Space Operations
- Role: Missile Warning
- Part of: 14 AF/21 SW
- Garrison/HQ: Robins AFB, Georgia

The United States Air Force's 9th Space Warning Squadron (9 SWS) was a United States Air Force missile warning unit located at Robins AFB, Georgia.

== History ==
The 9th Space Warning Squadron was originally constituted as the 9th Missile Warning Squadron (9 MWS) on 4 January 1985, and activated at Robins AFB on 1 July 1985. The 9 MWS controlled the Southeast facing AN/FPS-123 PAVE PAWS radar site, providing warning to detect sea-launched and intercontinental ballistic missiles. The site went mission operational on 10 November 1986. Later use of the radar included support for the USAF space surveillance network by providing satellite vehicle surveillance, tracking, and radar space object identification. With these added mission areas, the unit was redesignated 9th Space Warning Squadron (9 SWS).

As the likelihood of sea-based missile attacks from the Gulf of Mexico decreased, and the low probability of missile attacks from the South, the United States Air Force decided to close southern-facing PAVE PAWS sites at Robins AFB and Eldorado AS, Texas. Two radar faces, one each from Robins AFB and Eldorado AS, were moved to Clear AFS, Alaska as part of the BMEWS upgrade in 1998.

== Assignments ==
=== Major Command ===
- Air Force Space Command (4 Jan 1985-1995)

=== Wings/Groups ===
- 21st Space Wing (15 May 1992 – 1995)
- 1st Space Wing (1 Nov 1985 – 15 May 1992)

== Previous designations ==
- 9th Space Warning Squadron (15 May 1992 – Present)
- 9th Missile Warning Squadron (4 Jan 1985 – 15 May 1992)

== Equipment Operated ==
- AN/FPS-123 PAVE PAWS (1986–1995)

== See also ==
- PAVE PAWS
- Ballistic Missile Early Warning System
- phased-array radar
