= Edward L. Tixier =

United States Air Force general

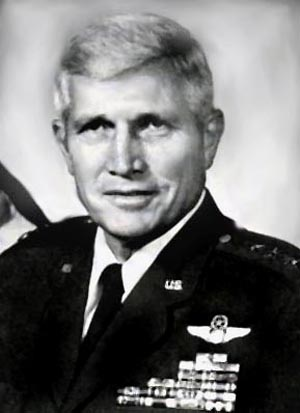
- Born: July 7, 1929; Clayton, New Mexico
- Died: June 3, 1999 (aged 69); Dripping Springs, Texas
- Military career
- Allegiance: United States
- Branch: United States Air Force
- Service years: 1953–1988
- Rank: Lieutenant general
- Commands: United States Forces Japan; Fifth Air Force; 20th Air Division; 21st Composite Wing
- Conflicts: Vietnam War
- Awards: Defense Distinguished Service Medal (2); Defense Superior Service Medal; Legion of Merit (2); Distinguished Flying Cross (2)

Edward Lewis Tixier (July 7, 1929 – June 3, 1999) was a lieutenant general in the United States Air Force who served as commander of United States Forces Japan and Fifth Air Force from 1984 until his retirement in 1988. He also served as deputy assistant secretary of defense for Near Eastern and South Asian Affairs from 1983 to 1984. Born in Clayton, New Mexico, Tixier attended the United States Military Academy and University of New Mexico was commissioned through ROTC in 1953. He died from a blood disorder in 1999.
