= 1st Space Wing =

Former US Air Force unit

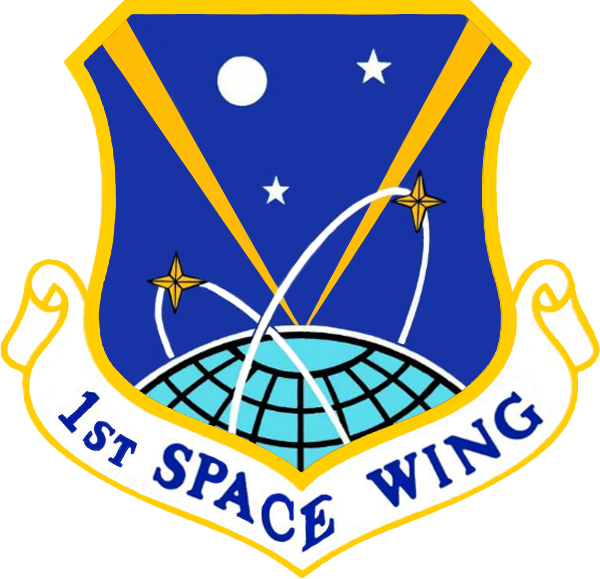
Emblem

The 1st Space Wing was a wing of the United States Air Force active from 1983 to 1992 at Peterson Air Force Base, Colorado as part of Air Force Space Command.

The Wing was constituted on 18 Oct 1982 and activated on 1 January 1983 with assignment to Space Command (later, Air Force Space Command).

It was inactivated on 15 May 1992 along with the 3d Space Wing, also at Peterson AFB, and the 21st Space Wing, a unit with a more historic lineage, took their place.

Its lineage continues with Space Base Delta 1 under the United States Space Force.

== Subordinate units ==
=== Groups ===
- 1st Space Support Group
- 12th Missile Warning Group (??)
- 47th Communications Group (??)
- 73d Space Surveillance Group (from AFSPC 1 Jun 1991 – 27 Feb 1992 to AFSPC)
- 4000th Satellite Operations Group (1981–83), later 1000th Satellite Operations Group (1983–1992)

=== Squadrons ===
- 1st Command and Control Squadron (??-??)
- 2d Communications Squadron (??)
- 3d Communications Squadron (??)
- 4th Satellite Communications Squadron, Mobile (??)
- 5th Defense Space Communications Squadron (??)
- 6th Missile Warning Squadron (??)
- 7th Missile Warning Squadron (??)
- 8th Missile Warning Squadron (??)
- 9th Missile Warning Squadron (??)
- 10th Missile Warning Squadron (??)
- 12th Missile Warning Squadron (??)
- 13th Missile Warning Squadron (??)
- 16th Surveillance Squadron (??)
- 17th Surveillance Squadron (??)
- 18th Surveillance Squadron (??)
- 19th Surveillance Squadron (??)
- 20th Missile Warning Squadron (??)
- 1025th Satellite Communications Squadron, Mobile (1 Nov 1985-1 Aug 1986 at Holloman AFB)

== Emblem ==
=== Blazon ===
Azure, from chief two rays pilewise or, terminating at base on a demi-globe light blue edged and grid-lined sable, surmounting the rays and globe are two uneven ellipses saltirewise argent, each intersected with a mullet of four points of the second and delineated of the fourth; positioned between the rays at dexter chief a globe and at sinister a mullet of five points and below them a smaller mullet of the same all of the fifth, all within a diminished bordure of the second.

=== Significance ===
The globe represents the earth as viewed from space; the earth being both the origin and control point for all man-made space activities. The lines of latitude and longitude emphasize the global nature of Air Force space operations. The two uneven ellipses represent both low and high orbital paths traced by satellites in earth orbit shown as four-point stars. The two yellow rays depict space surveillance and communications capability from ground base sensors. The larger of the two stars represents the Space Command, and the smaller and closest star to earth represents the 1st Space Wing of the Space Command. The two stars also along with the distinctive blue shading and small globe symbolize the space environment.

== See also ==
- 2d Space Wing
- 3d Space Wing
