= 3rd Satellite Communications Squadron =

U.S. Space Force unit

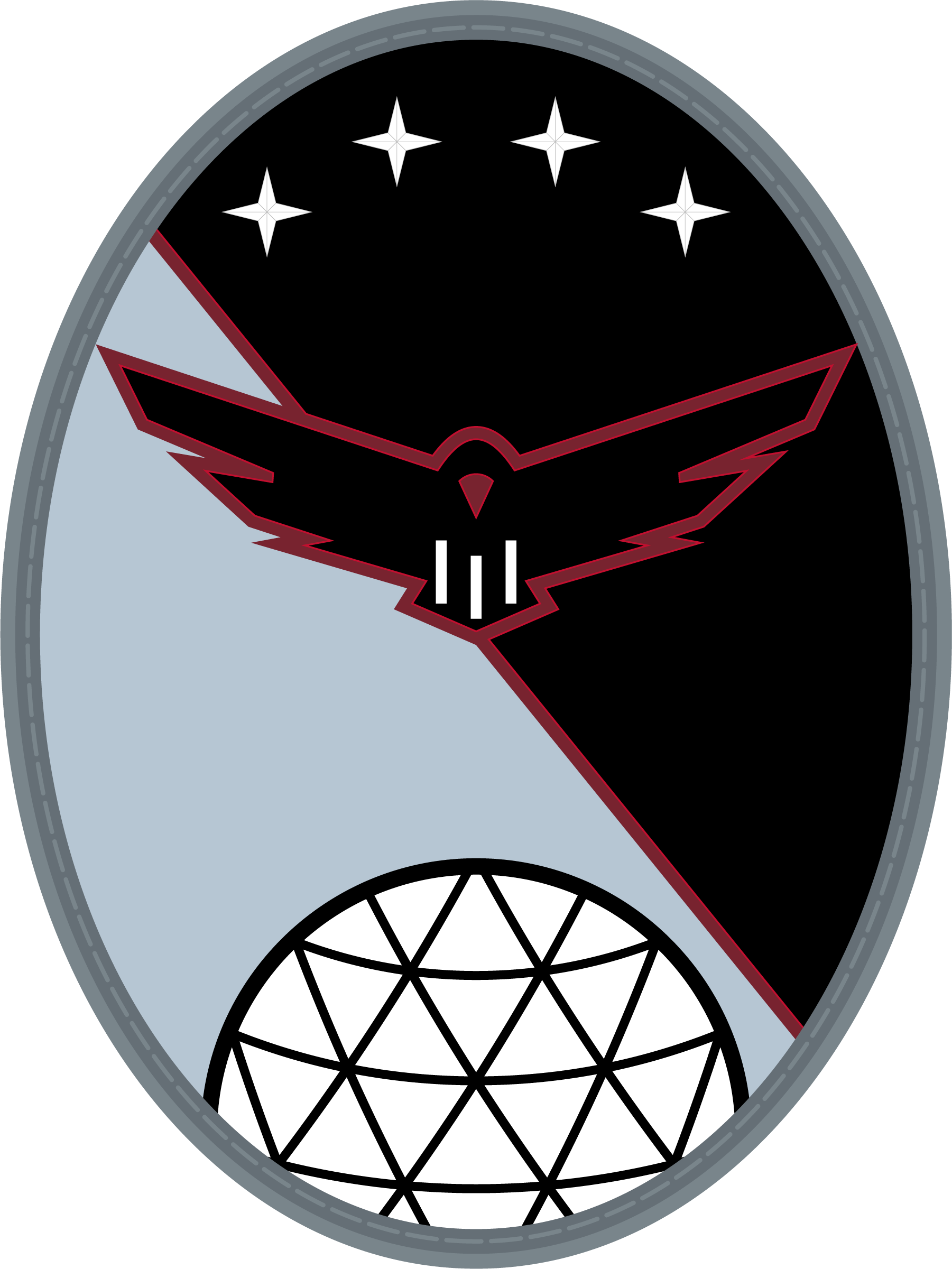
- 3 SCS emblem
- Active: 24 March 2022–present
- Country: United States
- Branch: United States Space Force
- Type: Squadron
- Role: Space domain awareness
- Part of: Mission Delta 4
- Headquarters: Buckley Space Force Base, Colorado, U.S.
- Nickname: Ravens

Commanders
- Current commander: Maj James Hur

The 3rd Satellite Communications Squadron is a United States Space Force unit responsible for maintaining critical communication for missile warning. It is a part of Mission Delta 4 and headquartered at Buckley Space Force Base, Colorado. It was activated on 24 March 2022 after inactivating Space Delta 4, Detachment 1.

== List of commanders ==
- Maj Luke Basham, 24 March 2022 – 23 June 2023
- Maj James Hur, 23 June 2023–present
