= James R. Brickel =

United States Air Force officer

James Russell Brickel
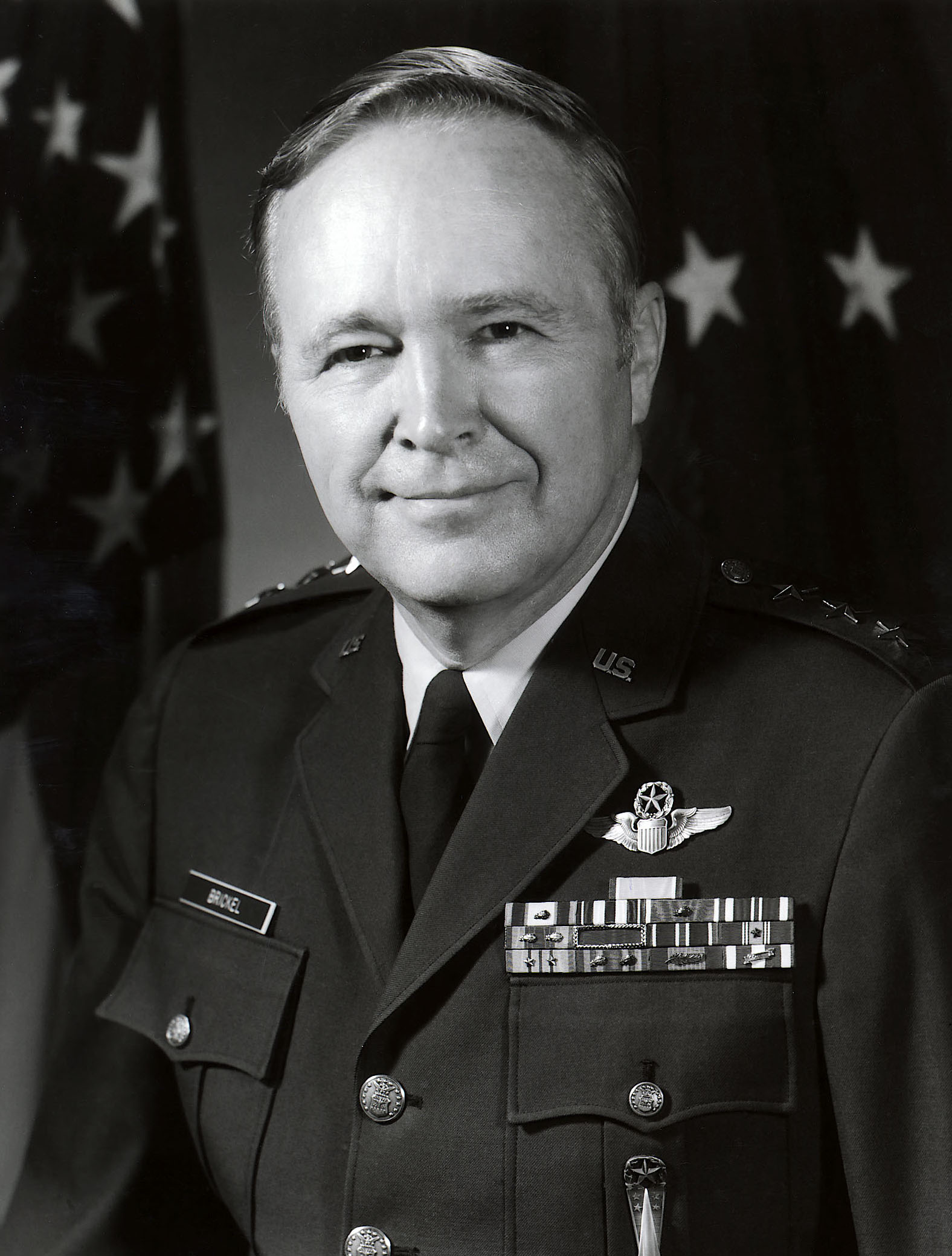
- Born: 18 September 1930; New York City
- Died: 21 November 2014 (aged 84); Sarasota, Florida
- Burial place: Arlington National Cemetery
- Military career
- Allegiance: United States of America
- Branch: United States Air Force
- Service years: 1948-1984
- Rank: Lieutenant general
- Commands: 20th Tactical Reconnaissance Squadron; 21st Composite Wing; Air Force Reserve Officers' Training Corps
- Conflicts: Vietnam War
- Awards: Air Force Cross; Distinguished Service Medal (2); Silver Star; Legion of Merit (2); Distinguished Flying Cross; Air Medal (11); Republic of Vietnam Gallantry Cross with palm

Lieutenant general James Russell Brickel (18 September 1930 - 21 November 2014) was a United States Air Force (USAF) officer.

== Early life and education ==
He was born in New York City on 18 September 1930. He attended Burlington High School in Vermont.

== Military career ==
He entered the United States Naval Academy, Annapolis, Maryland in 1948 and received his Bachelor of Science degree in electrical engineering and commission as a second lieutenant in the United States Air Force in 1952.

He graduated from pilot training in September 1953. He then was assigned as an F-86 Sabre pilot with the 49th Fighter-Interceptor Squadron at Dow Air Force Base, Maine, and moved with the squadron in 1955 to L.G. Hanscom Field, Massachusetts. He also served as a weapons instructor and flight commander while with the squadron. He completed the Squadron Officer Course by correspondence in 1955.

In September 1957 he entered the University of Michigan where he enrolled in graduate study in guided missiles and astronautics. He received master's degrees in instrumentation engineering and aeronautical engineering in 1959. He was assigned in September 1959 to the Air Force Special Weapons Center at Kirtland Air Force Base, New Mexico, as a project officer working with intercontinental ballistic missile warheads and re-entry system designs.

From May 1962 until November 1966, he served at the National Aeronautics and Space Administration Manned Spacecraft Center at Houston. He was assigned as a section head with the Flight Crew Operations Directorate, working on flight crew procedures, flight plans, and operational system tests for the Mercury, Gemini and Apollo projects.

He attended RF-101 combat crew training and in November 1966 transferred to Southeast Asia. He served as operations officer and then commander of the 20th Tactical Reconnaissance Squadron at Udorn Royal Thai Air Force Base, Thailand. During this tour of duty, he completed 106 combat missions over North Vietnam.

On 10 March 1967 he led a two-plane bomb damage assessment mission over the heavily defended Thái Nguyên iron and steel works. Despite his aircraft being severely damaged by anti-aircraft fire he successfully completed the mission and returned to base on one engine. For this action he was awarded the Air Force Cross on 3 July 1967.

Upon his return to the United States in October 1967, he went to Washington, D.C., where he served in the Directorate of Space, Office of the Deputy Chief of Staff, Research and Development, Headquarters U.S. Air Force, as research and development director and deputy chief, Policy and Plans Group. In September 1969 he was appointed deputy for staff operations to the executive secretary, National Aeronautics and Space Council, Executive Office of the President, a position he held until August 1970 when he entered the National War College.

Following graduation from the National War College in August 1971, he was assigned to Alaskan Air Command as commander of the 21st Composite Wing at Elmendorf Air Force Base. He was appointed deputy assistant to the secretary of defense (atomic energy) in August 1972. In June 1974 he was assigned as deputy director of information, Office of the Secretary of the Air Force, Washington, D.C. He became commandant of the Air Force Reserve Officers' Training Corps in March 1975, and in June 1975 he assumed the additional duty of vice commander, Air University at Maxwell Air Force Base, Alabama.

In July 1977 he transferred to Washington, D.C., to serve as director of concepts, Office of the Deputy Chief of Staff, Plans and Operations, Headquarters U.S. Air Force. In August 1978 he assumed the position of assistant deputy chief of staff, programs and analysis. He was named assistant deputy chief of staff for research, development and acquisition at Air Force headquarters in December 1978, and remained there until June 1981, when he assumed duty as deputy commander in chief, U.S. Readiness Command and vice director, Joint Deployment Agency at MacDill Air Force Base, Florida. He was promoted to lieutenant general on 1 June 1981, with date of rank of 31 May 1981. He retired from the Air Force on 1 September 1984.

== Later life ==
Following his retirement he worked for United Technologies Corporation.

He died of Parkinson's Disease on 21 November 2014 in Sarasota, Florida. He was buried at Arlington National Cemetery.

== Decorations ==
His military decorations and awards include the Air Force Cross, Distinguished Service Medal with oak leaf cluster, Silver Star, Legion of Merit with oak leaf cluster, Distinguished Flying Cross, Air Medal with 10 oak leaf clusters, Presidential Unit Citation emblem, Air Force Outstanding Unit Award ribbon with oak leaf cluster and Republic of Vietnam Gallantry Cross with palm.
