= 2nd Space Warning Squadron =

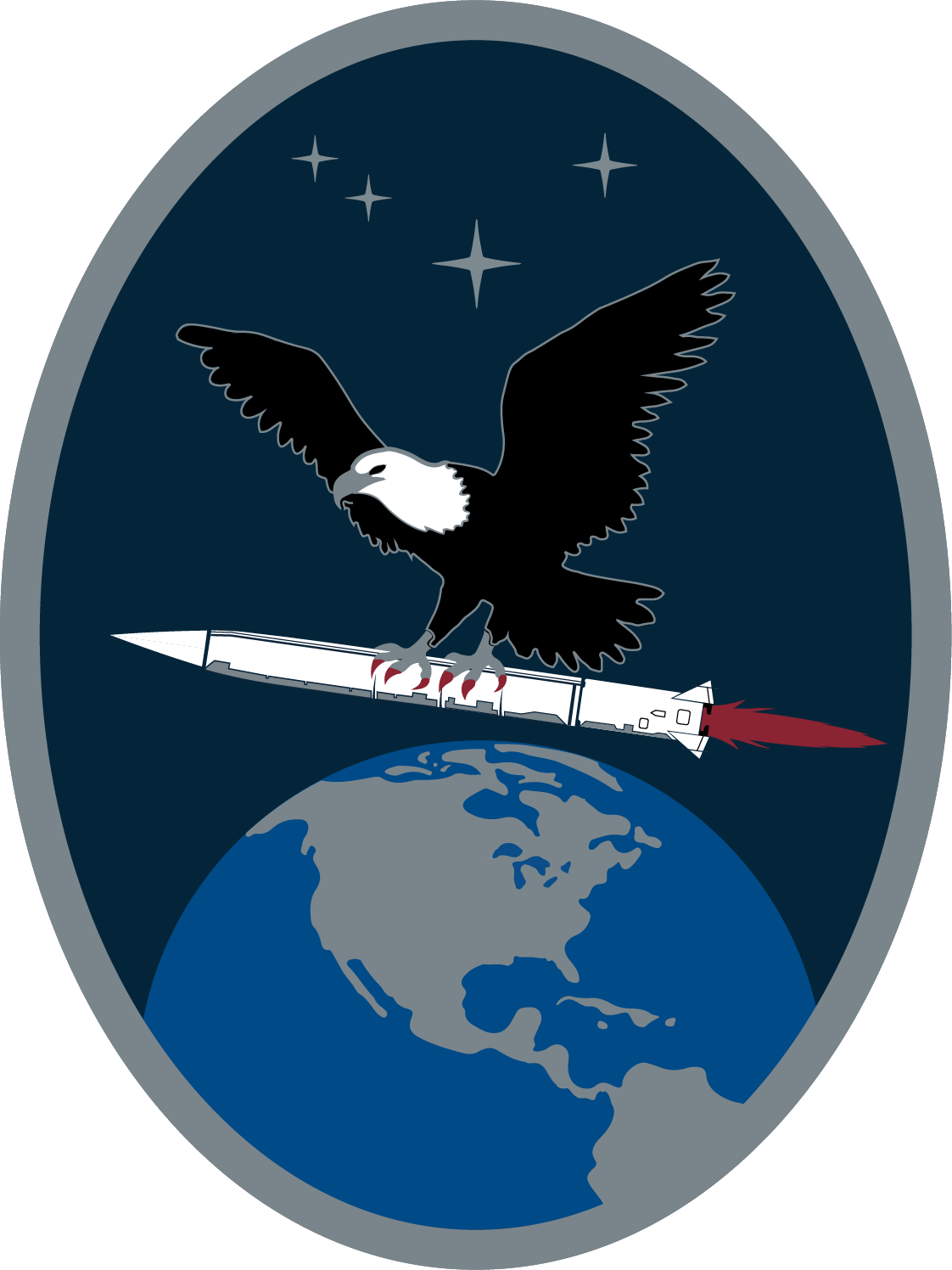
- Emblem of the 2nd Space Warning Squadron
- Active: 1992–present
- Country: United States
- Branch: United States Space Force
- Role: Missile Warning
- Part of: Space Delta 4
- Garrison/HQ: Buckley Space Force Base, Colorado
- Nickname: Squawkin' Dogs
- Mottos: Ils Ne Passeront Pas; (French: "They Shall Not Pass")

Commanders
- Current commander: Lt Col Ann Hughes

The 2nd Space Warning Squadron is part of the Space Delta 4 at Buckley Space Force Base, Colorado. It operates the Space-Based Infrared System satellites conducting global monitoring for significant infrared events.

The squadron's mission is to operate and maintain the Space-Based Infrared System. Additionally, it reports ballistic missile and space launches, nuclear detonations, and infrared data of operational value to the President of the United States, Secretary of Defense, combatant commanders, intelligence agencies, and global warfighters.

== Operations ==
On 7 January 2020, 2nd Space Warning Squadron detected the launches of more than a dozen missiles against US operatives and coalition partners in and around Iran. This provided crucial warning to the troops, which helped them to take cover.

== History ==
The squadron has operated ground stations set up to control the Defense Support Program (DSP) and Space-Based Infrared System, space-based surveillance systems configured to detect and report ballistic missile launches, space launches, and nuclear detonations since 1992.

== Lineage ==
- Constituted as the 2d Space Communications Squadron on 1 May 1992

Activated on 15 May 1992
Redesignated 2d Space Warning Squadron on 1 May 1993

=== Assignments ===
- 21st Operations Group, 15 May 1992
- 21st Space Wing, 21 July 1995
- 460th Operations Group, unknown – present

=== Stations ===
- Buckley Air National Guard Base (now Buckley Space Force Base), Colorado, 15 May 1992 – present

=== Systems Operated ===
- Space-Based Infrared System satellites (200x-present)
- Defense Support Program satellites (1992–present)

== List of commanders ==
- Lt Col John Henley, July 2011
- Lt Col Francois Roy, July 2013
- Lt Col April Wimmer, 7 July 2015
- Lt Col Shannon DaSilva, 11 May 2017
- Lt Col Brandon Davenport, 5 June 2019
- Lt Col Michael Mariner, 1 July 2021
- Lt Col Scott M. Wright, 7 July 2023
