= Mission Delta 4 =

U.S. Space Force missile warning and tracking unit

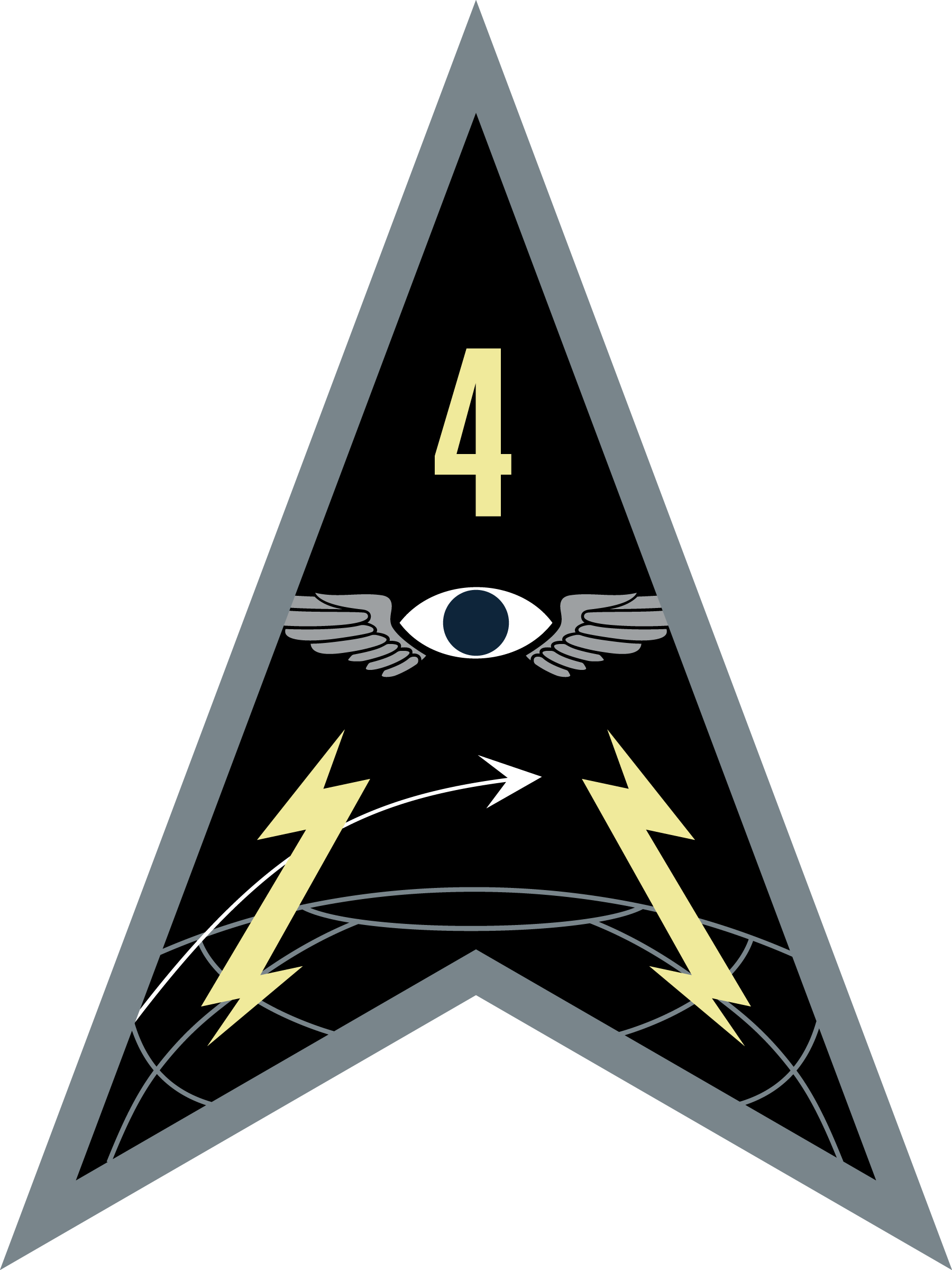
- Emblem of Mission Delta 4
- Founded: 24 July 2020; 6 years ago
- Country: United States
- Branch: United States Space Force
- Type: Delta
- Role: Missile warning and tracking
- Size: 1,200 personnel
- Part of: United States Space Force Combat Forces Command
- Headquarters: Buckley Space Force Base, Colorado, U.S.
- Mottos: Latin: Videmus Mundum, lit. 'We see the world.'
- Website: www.buckley.spaceforce.mil

Commanders
- Commander: Col Aaron L. Cochran
- Vice Commander: Lt Col Randall E. Carlson
- Senior Enlisted Leader: CMSgt Kyle T. Mullen

Insignia
- Guidon

Mission Delta 4 (MD4) is a United States Space Force unit responsible for providing strategic and theater missile warning and tracking to the United States and its international partners. It operates three constellations of Overhead Persistent Infrared (OPIR) satellites and two types of Ground-Based Radars (GBRs) for the purpose of conducting strategic and theater missile warning and tracking. Additionally, DEL 4 provides tipping and cueing to missile defense forces, battlespace awareness to combatant commanders and technical intelligence for further analysis and manages weapon system architectures and ensures operations are intelligence-led, cyber-resilient, and driven by innovation, while postured to operate in a contested, degraded, and operationally-limited environment.

Activated on 24 July 2020, the delta is headquartered at Buckley Space Force Base, Colorado. On 31 October 2024 it was redesignated Mission Delta 4 and gained sustainment responsibilities, along with organic cyber defense and intelligence forces.

== History ==
DEL 4 was based on the previous 460th Operations Group, 460th Space Wing and 21st Operations Group, 21st Space Wing.

In lineage terms, the delta was originally established as 460 Operations Group (460 SW) on 2 August 2004. It was activated on 19 August 2004. It was redesignated as Space Delta 4 on 24 July 2020. Its status changed officially from a unit of the United States Air Force to a unit of the United States Space Force on 21 October 2020.

In 2023, Space Delta 4 assumed control of the U.S. Army's Joint Tactical Ground Station. On 31 October 2024 it was redesignated Mission Delta 4 and gained sustainment responsibilities, along with organic cyber defense and intelligence forces.

== Structure ==
Emblem	Name	Function	Headquarters	Spacecraft and ground-based radars	Detachments
Squadrons
	2nd Space Warning Squadron	Missile warning, missile defense, battlespace awareness, and technical intelligence	Buckley Space Force Base, Colorado	Defense Support Program; Space Based Infrared System	
	3rd Satellite Communications Squadron	Military communications	Buckley Space Force Base, Colorado		
	5th Space Warning Squadron	Missile warning and space domain awareness	Buckley Space Force Base, Colorado	Joint Tactical Ground Station	Det 1: Naval Air Station Sigonella, Italy; Det 2: Qatar (Note: This detachment location is inferred based on the locations of the detachments of the 1st Space Company, 1st Space Battalion of the U.S. Army, of which there were four. This unit is what was absorbed by the Space Force to become the 5th Space Warning Squadron. This detachment was previously known as JTAGS-Qatar under the Army.); Det 3: Osan Air Base, South Korea; Det 4: Misawa Air Base, Japan
	6th Space Warning Squadron	Missile warning and space domain awareness	Cape Cod Space Force Station, Massachusetts	AN/FPS-132 Upgraded Early Warning Radar	
	7th Space Warning Squadron	Missile Defense and space domain awareness	Beale Air Force Base, California	AN/FPS-132 Upgraded Early Warning Radar; Long Range Discrimination Radar	
	10th Space Warning Squadron	Missile warning and space domain awareness	Cavalier Space Force Station, North Dakota	AN/FPQ-16 Perimeter Acquisition Radar Attack Characterization System	
	11th Space Warning Squadron	Missile warning, missile defense, battlespace awareness, and technical intelligence	Buckley Space Force Base, Colorado	Defense Support Program; Space Based Infrared System	
	12th Space Warning Squadron	Missile warning and space domain awareness	Pituffik Space Base, Greenland	AN/FPS-132 Upgraded Early Warning Radar	
	13th Space Warning Squadron	Missile warning, missile defense, and space domain awareness	Clear Space Force Station, Alaska	AN/FPS-132 Upgraded Early Warning Radar; AN/FPS-108 Cobra Dane (Operating Location); Long Range Discrimination Radar	Operating Location: Eareckson Air Station, Alaska
Operating locations
	Operating Location – Fylingdales	Missile warning and space domain awareness	RAF Fylingdales, United Kingdom	AN/FPS-132 Upgraded Early Warning Radar	

== List of commanders ==
No.	Commander		Term			Ref
No.	Portrait	Name	Took office	Left office	Duration	Ref
1	Richard L. Bourquin	Colonel; Richard L. Bourquin	24 July 2020	15 July 2021	356 days	
2	Miguel A. Cruz	Colonel; Miguel A. Cruz	15 July 2021	21 July 2023	2 years, 6 days	
3	Ernest R. Schmitt	Colonel; Ernest R. Schmitt	21 July 2023	16 July 2025	1 year, 360 days	
4	Aaron L. Cochran	Colonel; Aaron L. Cochran	16 July 2025	1 July 2026	350 days	
5	Brandon L. Davenport	Colonel; Brandon L. Davenport	1 July 2026	Incumbent	103 days	
