= 3rd Space Support Wing =

Former unit of the United States Air Force

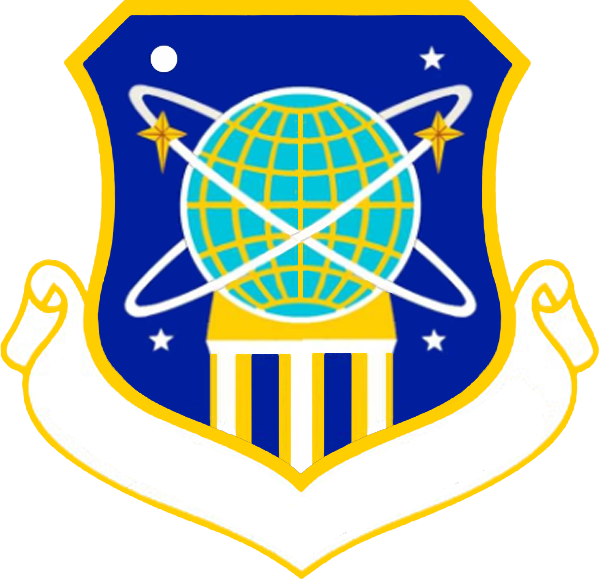
Emblem

The 3d Space Support Wing (3 SSW) was a wing of the United States Air Force active from 1986 to 1992 at Peterson Air Force Base, Colorado as part of Air Force Space Command.

== History ==
The wing was constituted as the 3d Space Support Wing on 8 Oct 1986 and activated on 15 Oct 1986.

It was inactivated on 15 May 1992 along with the 1st Space Wing. The 21st Space Wing, a unit with a more historic lineage, took their place.

== Components ==
- Cheyenne Mountain Support Group
- USAF Clinic, Peterson AFB
- 1002d Special Security Squadron, Falcon AFS (according to Air Force Address Directory AFR 10-4 15 July 1987, p176)
- 1003d Comptroller Squadron (AFAD AFR 10-4 1987)
- 1003d Mission Support Squadron
- 1003d Mobile Command and Control Squadron
- 1003d Space Support Group, Peterson AFB (AFAD AFR 10-4 1987)
  - 1003d Security Police Squadron, Peterson AFB (AFAD AFR 10-4 1987)
  - 1003d Civil Engineering Squadron, Peterson AFB (AFAD AFR 10-4 1987)
  - 1003d Services Squadron, Peterson AFB (AFAD AFR 10-4 1987)
  - 1003d Transportation Squadron
- 1004th Space Support Group
- 1012th Air Base Group (at Thule Air Base, Greenland)
  - 1015th Air Base Squadron
- 2163d Communications Group

== Emblem ==
=== Blazon ===
Azure, resting on a pillar issuing from base or, detailed argent, a globe celeste (blue turquoise) grid-lined of the second and outlined of the third within two orbital rings saltirewise of the like each charged in chief with a polestar gold; all between three mullets and a plate argent, the plate in dexter chief; all within a diminished bordure or.

=== Symbolism ===
Blue and yellow are the Air Force colors. Blue alludes to the sky, the primary theater of Air Force operations. Yellow refers to the sun and the excellence required of Air Force personnel. The globe represents the earth as viewed from space. The latitude and longitude lines emphasize the global nature of Air Force space operations. The ellipses and stars represent the orbital paths traced by satellites. The pillar represents the support mission of the wing.

== See also ==
- 1st Space Wing
- 2d Space Wing
