= Cavalier Space Force Station =

US Space Force station near Cavalier, North Dakota

- Near Cavalier, North Dakota in United States
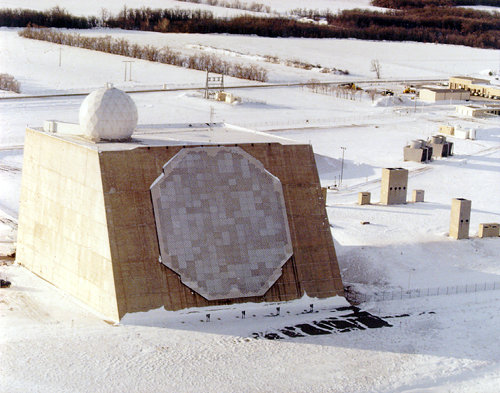
- The AN/FPQ-16 PARCS solid state phased array radar system at Cavalier AFS.

- Emblem of Space Base Delta 2

Site information
- Type: US Space Force station
- Owner: Department of Defense
- Operator: United States Space Force
- Controlled by: Space Base Delta 2
- Condition: Operational
- Radar type: AN/FPQ-16 PARCS

Location
- Location in the United States Cavalier SFS (the United States)
- Coordinates: 48°43′55″N 97°54′16″W

Site history
- Built: October 3, 1977
- In use: 1977 – present

Garrison information
- Occupants: 10th Space Warning Squadron

Cavalier Space Force Station, North Dakota, is a United States Space Force installation, where the 10th Space Warning Squadron, Space Delta 4, United States Space Force monitors and tracks potential missile launches against North America with the GE AN/FPQ-16 Enhanced Perimeter Acquisition Radar Attack Characterization System (PARCS). The PARCS also monitors and tracks over half of all earth-orbiting objects to enable space situation awareness and space control. In addition to contractors, NORAD has US and Canadian military members assigned to the facility.

== AN/FPQ-16 PARCS ==
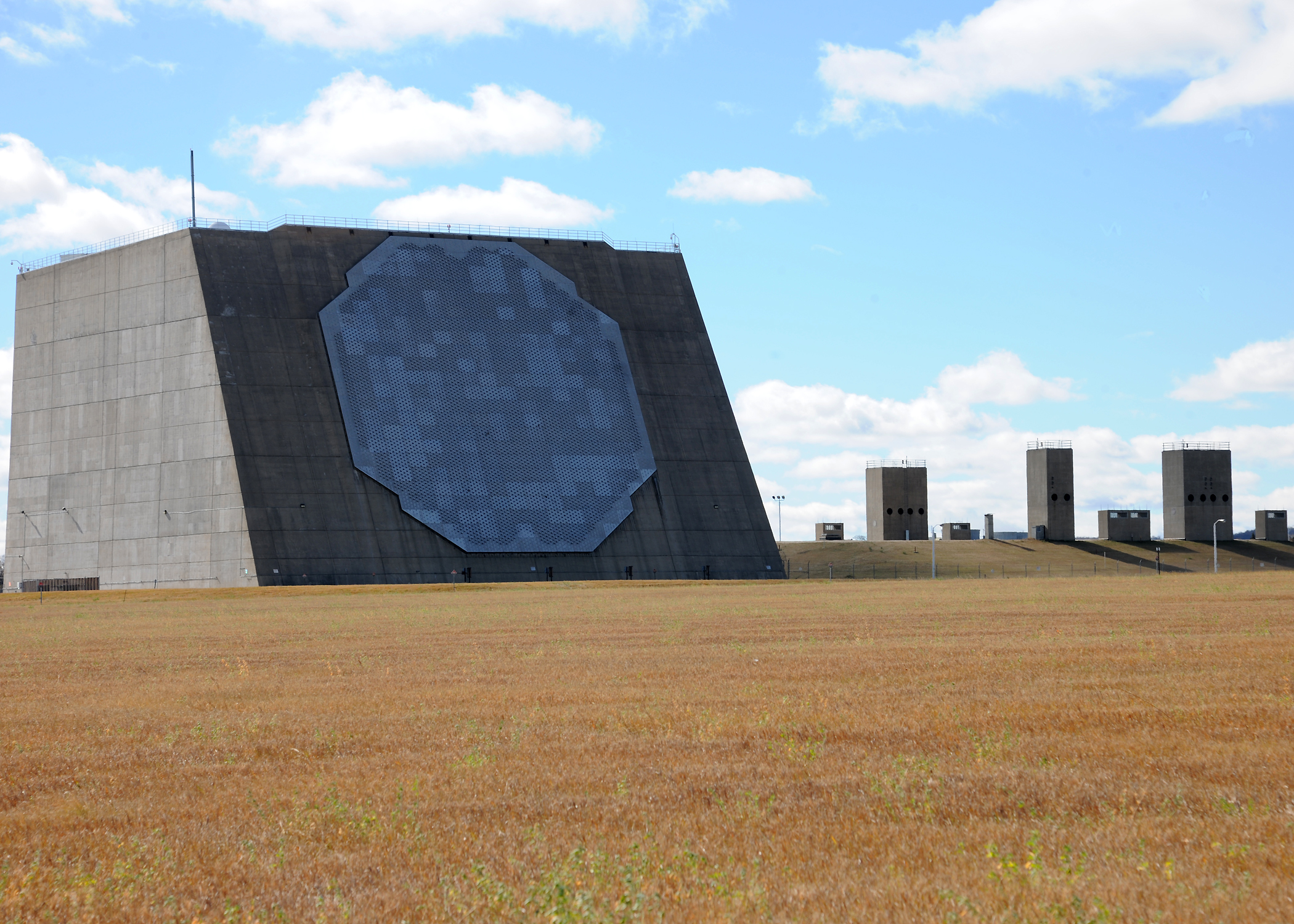
The AN/FPQ-16 PARCS building at Cavalier.

The AN/FPQ-16 PARCS is a solid state phased array radar system housed "on a plain just east of the Pembina Escarpment" in a 37 m (121 ft) with a single-faced phased array radar pointed northward over Hudson Bay. In normal operation PARCS can spot an object the size of a basketball (24 cm) at 3000 km (2000 miles). Tests during the 1970s and 1980s showed that with proposed software updates (not carried out) it could spot objects less than 9 cm in size. It analyzes more than 20,000 tracks per day, from giant satellites to space debris.

The PARCS building includes an underground power plant with five, 16 cylinder dual-fuel (diesel/natural gas) engines manufactured by Cooper Bessemer driving 5 General Electric generators for a total output of 14 megawatts.

== History ==
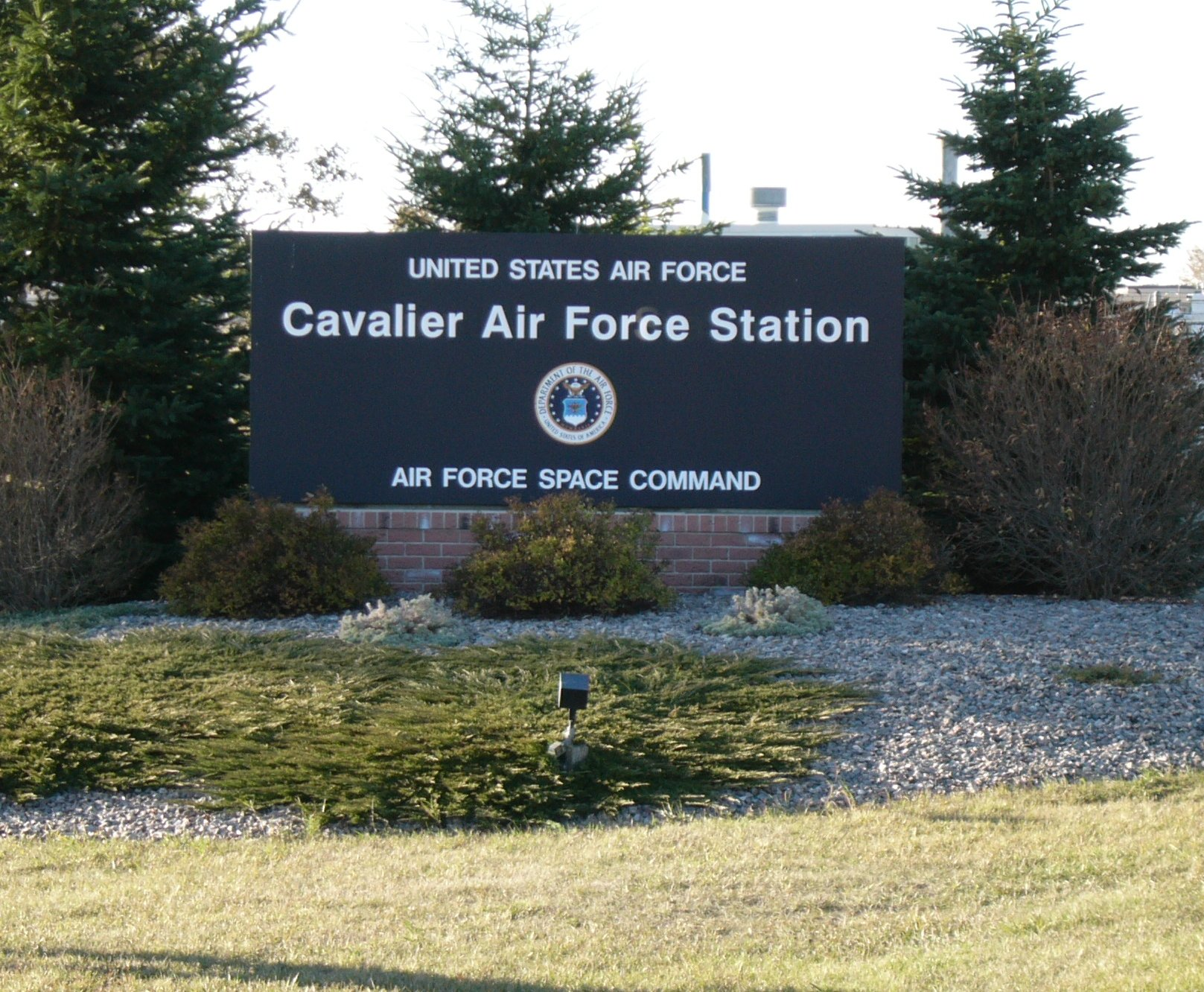
Sign at entrance to Cavalier.

The facility was built as one site of the Stanley R. Mickelsen Safeguard Complex for the Safeguard Program's anti-ballistic missile defense, with the PAR providing detection data for computing preliminary trajectories to be provided to the Missile Site Radar (the complex was deactivated in 1976). On 3 October 1977, the site was transferred to the United States Air Force and expanded it into the Concrete Missile Early Warning System (CMEWS) named for the nearby Concrete ND community.

The military installation was named for the nearby town of Cavalier, North Dakota in 1983 when Concrete's post office closed.

BAE Systems maintained the PARCS site from 2003 - 2017.

Summit Technical Solutions, LLC took over the Operations, Maintenance and Logistics support of the PARCS site in October 2017.

On 30 July 2021 Cavalier Air Force Station was renamed Cavalier Space Force Station.

== Based units ==
Notable units based at Cavalier Air Force Station.

=== United States Space Force ===
Space Force Combat Forces Command (CFC)

- Space Delta 4
  - 10th Space Warning Squadron (GSU)

The 10th SWS is a Geographically Separate Unit, which although based at Cavalier, is subordinate to Space Delta 4 based at Buckley Space Force Base in Colorado.
