= 2d Command and Control Squadron =

US Air Force unit

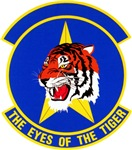
- 2d Command and Control Squadron emblem
- Active: 19??-???
- Country: United States
- Branch: United States Air Force
- Part of: Air Force Space Command/21st Space Wing
- Garrison/HQ: Falcon AFB, Colorado
- Motto: EYES OF THE TIGER
- Decorations: AFOUA

The United States Air Force's 2d Command and Control Squadron (2 CACS) was an Air Force Space Command command and control unit located at Falcon AFB (later Schriever AFB), Colorado. The 2 CACS commanded passive surveillance systems supporting USSPACECOM and theater warfighters’ requirements through continuous all-weather, day-night surveillance of on-orbit satellites.

== Mission ==
The 2 CACS was responsible for planning, assessing, and developing execution orders for passive surveillance missions around the world, at locations such as Misawa AB, Japan, Osan AB, Republic of Korea, RAF Feltwell, United Kingdom and RAF Edzell, United Kingdom.

Information from the sites' Low Altitude Surveillance System (LASS) and Deep Space Tracking System (DSTS) were fed to 2 CACS, which was then forwarded onto the space surveillance center at Cheyenne Mountain AFS, Colorado. The center uses this data, along with data from other sensors, to maintain a catalog of man-made objects in space.

== Assignments ==
=== Major Command ===
- Air Force Space Command (???- ???)

== Previous designations ==
- 2d Command and Control Squadron (???)

== Commanders ==
- Lt Col James E. Mackin (c. 1996)
- Lt Col T. Clark (c. 1995)

== Bases stationed ==
- Schriever AFB, Colorado (???-???)

== Equipment Commanded ==
- Low Altitude Surveillance System (???-???)
  - Detachment 1, 3d SSS - Osan AB, Republic of Korea
  - 5th SSS - RAF Feltwell, United Kingdom
  - 17 SSS - RAF Edzell, United Kingdom
- Deep Space Tracking System (???-???)
  - 3d SSS - Misawa AB, Japan
  - 5th SSS - RAF Feltwell, United Kingdom

== Decorations ==
- Air Force Outstanding Unit Award
  - 1 January 1998 – 31 December 1998
  - 1 October 1997 – 30 September 1999
  - 1 October 1995 – 30 September 1997

== See also ==
- 3d Space Surveillance Squadron
- 5th Space Surveillance Squadron
- 17th Space Surveillance Squadron
