= 721 (disambiguation) =

721 is the year AD 721.

721 may also refer to:

== Military ==
- 721st Air Mobility Operations Group, a unit of the United States Air Force
- 721st Aircraft Control and Warning Squadron, a defunct United States Air Force unit
- 721st Bombardment Squadron, a defunct United States Air Force unit
- 721st Naval Air Group, a unit of the Imperial Japanese Navy Air Service
- 721 Naval Air Squadron, a Fleet Air Arm squadron of the Royal Navy
- 721st Operations Group, a unit of the United States Space Force
- 721st Operations Support Squadron, a unit of the United States Space Force
- 721st Radar Squadron, a defunct United States Air Force unit
- 721st Tactical Fighter Squadron, a unit of the United States Air Force

== Ships ==
- USS Chicago (SSN-721), a United States Navy Los Angeles-class submarine
- USS Don O. Woods (DE-721), a United States Navy high-speed transport
- USS Linta (SP-721), a United States Navy patrol vessel
- USCGC Gallatin (WHEC-721), a United States Coast Guard cutter later transferred to Nigeria as NNS Okpabana
- RVNS Đằm Thoại (HQ-721), a South Vietnamese cutter formerly designated as USCGC Point Mast
- German submarine U-721, a World War II German Navy Type VIIC submarine

== Transportation ==
- 721 series, a type of electric multiple unit train operated in Japan
- Caledonian Railway 721 Class, a class of 4-4-0 steam locomotives
- Delhi Transport Corporation Bus Route 721
- March 721, a Formula One racing car built by March Engineering
- Embraer EMB 721 Sertanejo

=== Roads and highways ===
- List of highways numbered 721
- National Route 721 (Costa Rica)
- Ohio State Route 721
- Virginia State Route 721
- Alberta Highway 721
- Connecticut Route 721
- Florida State Road 721
- Georgia State Route 721
- Kentucky Route 721
- Louisiana Highway 721
- South Carolina Highway 721
- County Road 721 (Glades County, Florida)
- County Road 721 (Highlands County, Florida)
- County Route 721 (Camden County, New Jersey)
- County Route 721 (Cumberland County, New Jersey)
- Farm to Market Road 721
- Saskatchewan Highway 721

== Science and technology ==
- 721 (number), a centered hexagonal number
- 721 Tabora, a carbonaceous asteroid from the outer regions of the asteroid belt
- 81-720/721, a model of subway car used by the Moscow Metro
- ERC-721, a standard smart contract interface for non-fungible tokens on the Ethereum blockchain
- G.721, an ITU-T speech codec standard superseded by G.726
- Swiss 721, a typeface variation of Helvetica
- Minuscule 721, a Greek minuscule manuscript of the New Testament
- NGC 721, a barred spiral galaxy in the constellation Andromeda
- Gliese 721, an alternate designation for the star Vega

== Law and government ==
- 564 U.S. 721, the U.S. Supreme Court case Arizona Free Enterprise Club's Freedom Club PAC v. Bennett
- 538 U.S. 721, the U.S. Supreme Court case Nevada Department of Human Resources v. Hibbs
- Guantanamo captive 721, an index designation for a Tunisian detainee held at Guantanamo Bay
- United Nations Security Council Resolution 721, a resolution regarding the former Yugoslavia

== Other uses ==
- 721 incident, a violent mob attack that happened in Yuen Long, Hong Kong
- Earth-721, an alternative reality designation in the Marvel Universe
- No. 721 Signals Unit RAF, a communications unit of the Royal Air Force
- Volcanion, whose index #721 in the National Pokedex
- BWV 721, a chorale prelude by Johann Sebastian Bach
- Remington Model 721, a bolt-action sporting rifle manufactured by Remington Arms
- Trump Tower, a skyscraper located at 721 Fifth Avenue in New York City
- 721 BC, a year in the 8th century BC
