= 1st Space Surveillance Squadron =

1st Space Surveillance Squadron

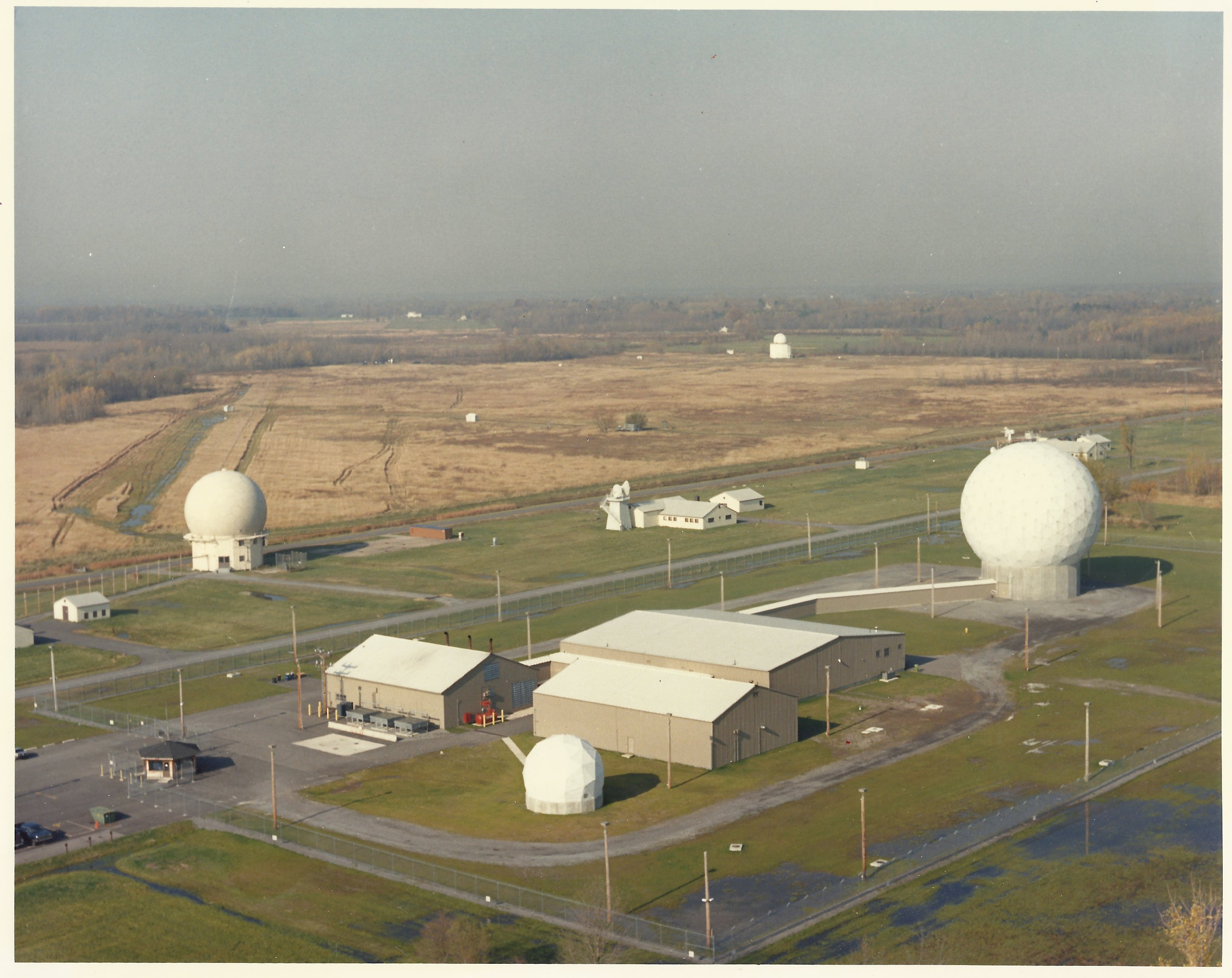
- Verona Test Annex, New York
- Active: 1989–1995
- Country: United States
- Branch: United States Air Force
- Role: Space Surveillance Intelligence Collection
- Size: 79 personnel
- Part of: Air Force Space Command
- Garrison/HQ: Verona Test Annex, New York

Insignia
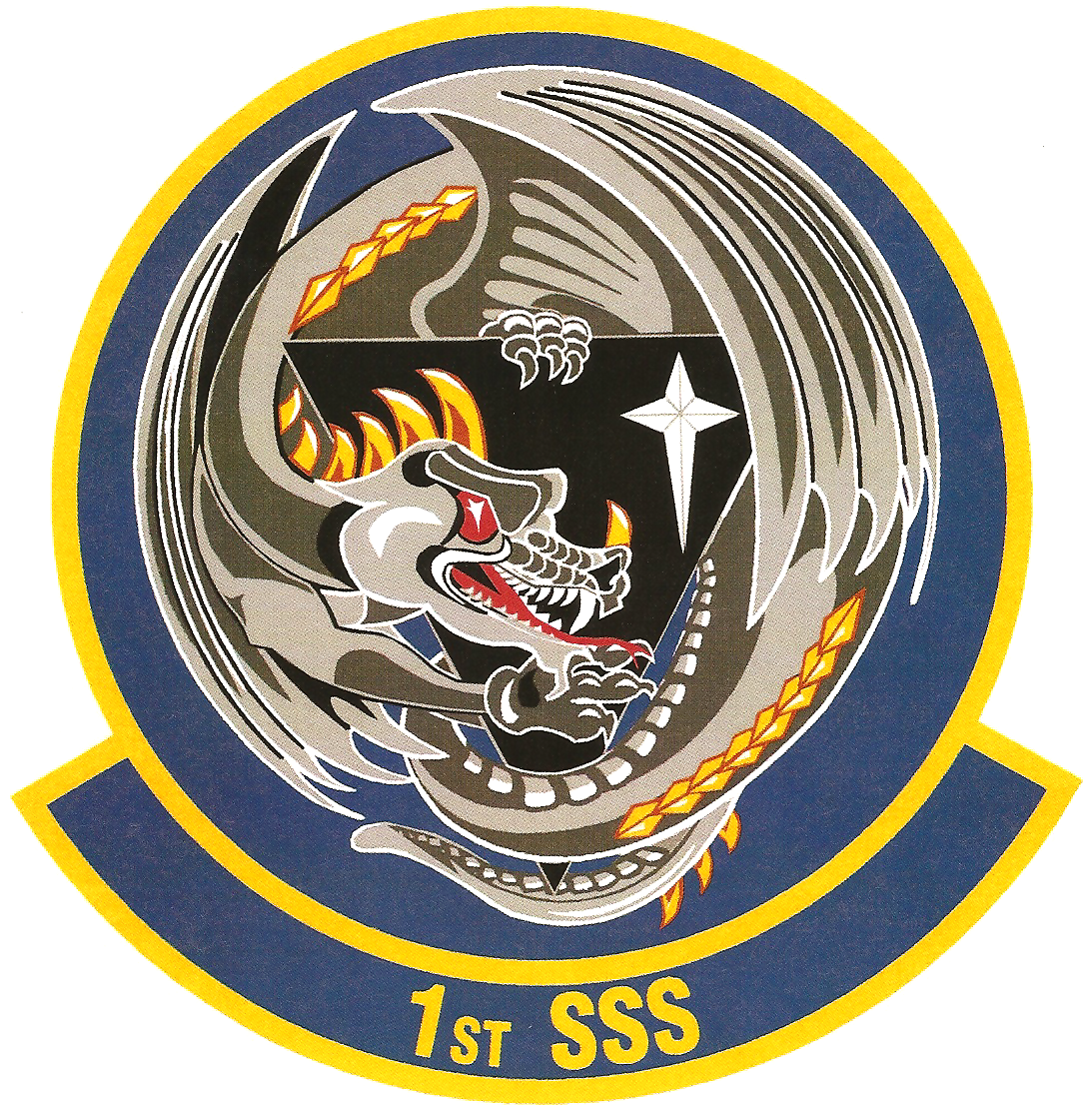
- 1st Space Surveillance Squadron emblem (approved 4 March 1992) (Note: Symbolism: The dragon is the vigilant sentinel mascot of the 1st Space Surveillance Squadron, on guard for deep space satellites. The dragon is tightly holding a black, inverted equilateral triangle of deep space indicative of the unit's surveillance tracking coverage. The four pointed star represents a geosynchronous satellite within tracking coverage of the squadron. The dragon's eye reflects the star and sheds light on the darkness of space through the unit's surveillancemission and contributions to space warning, space control and space force management. The background represents the global aerospace projection of the Air Force. USAFPatches.com: 1st Space Surveillance Squadron)

The United States Air Force's 1st Space Surveillance Squadron (1 SSS) was a space surveillance unit located at Griffiss AFB, New York.

== Mission ==
The mission of the 1 SSS was to operate the Low Altitude Space Surveillance (LASS) system to gather space intelligence and track space systems in near-Earth orbits. The LASS operation supported USAF space intelligence requirements, while being assisted by the 18th Intelligence Squadron's Det 1 for SIGINT support. This coverage augmented worldwide coverage of space signals activities at similarly equipped sites at Misawa AB, Japan, Osan AB, Republic of Korea and at RAF Feltwell and RAF Edzell in the United Kingdom.

== History ==
Due to the creation of mobile versions of the space surveillance systems in 1992 and the BRAC decision regarding Griffiss AFB, AFSPC inactivated the 1 SSS during 1995, distributing surveillance mission requirements to other units. The equipment held at the Verona Test Annex, N.Y. was also distributed to units with similar capabilities.

== Lineage ==
- Constituted as the 1st Deep Space Surveillance Squadron on 10 February 1989

Activated on 1 April 1989
Redesignated 1st Surveillance Squadron on 1 May 1990
Redesignated 1st Space Surveillance Squadron on 15 May 1992
Inaxtivated on 30 September 1995

=== Assignments ===
- 73d Space Surveillance Group (later 73d Space Group), 1 April 1989
- 21st Operations Group, 26 April 1995 – 30 September 1995)

=== Stations ===
- Verona Test Annex, New York, 1 April 1989 – 30 September 1995

=== Commanders ===
- Jun 1993 – Jun 1995, Lt Col Stephen L. Lanning
- Aug 1992 – Jun 1993, Lt Col Michael Peterson

=== Equipment Operated ===
- Low Altitude Space Surveillance System (1989–1995)

== See also ==
- 3d Space Experimentation Squadron
- 5th Space Surveillance Squadron
- 18th Intelligence Squadron
- Griffiss Air Force Base, New York
