= 17th Expeditionary Space Control Squadron =

- Active: 1967–1969; 1971–1976; 1982–1989; 1993–1996; 2009–
- Country: United States
- Branch: United States Air Force
- Role: Space Surveillance
- Part of: Air Force Space Command
- Garrison/HQ: Peterson AFB
- Motto: Eternal Vigilance
- Decorations: Air Force Outstanding Unit Award

Insignia
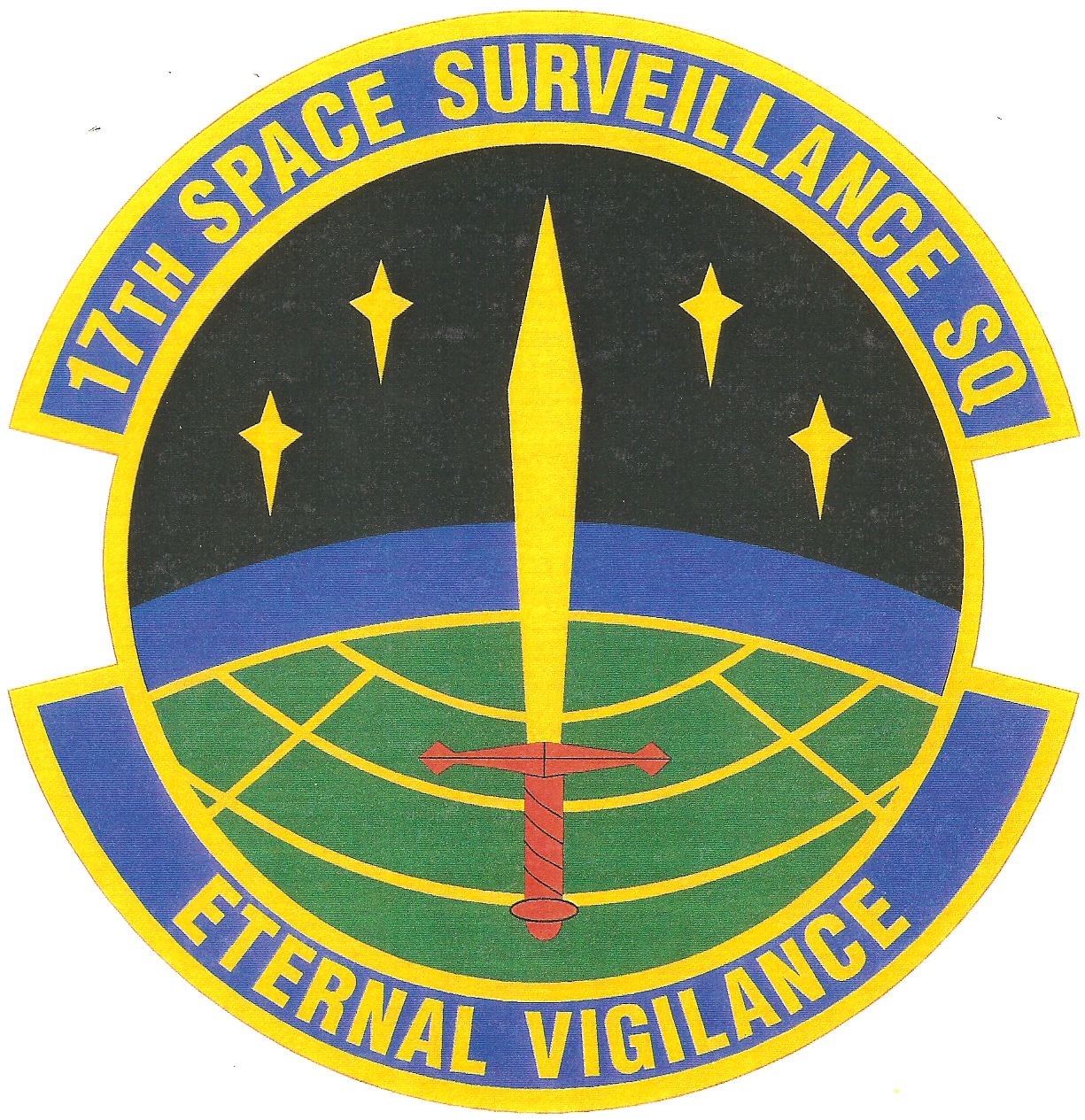
- 17th Expeditionary Space Control Squadron emblem (approved 8 June 1995)

The United States Air Force's 17th Expeditionary Space Control Squadron is a provisional unit of the United States Air Force stationed at Peterson Air Force Base, Colorado.

As the 17th Space Surveillance Squadron, the unit operated sensors for the Low-Altitude Surveillance System from RAF Feltwell.

== History ==
The squadron was first organized at Moorestown, New Jersey as the 17th Surveillance Squadron. The 17th operated a radar sensor for the USAF Spacetrack System at Moorestown until it was inactivated in December 1969.

The squadron was redesignated the 17th Radar Squadron and activated at Ko Kha Air Station, Thailand in September 1971. At Ko Kha, it tracked Chinese missile launches and southerly launches from the Soviet Union, until its inactivation in May 1976.

The 17th returned to its original designation of 17th Surveillance Squadron and was activated at Naval Station San Miguel, Philippines on 1 August 1982. At San Miguel, the unit operated a radar sensor for the United States Space Surveillance Network. Its AN/GPS-10 radar reached initial operational capability in April of the following year and the squadron continued operating it until shortly before inactivating again in June 1989, when its radar was decommissioned and replaced by a radar at Saipan.

Reactivating again in October 1993 at RAF Edzell, Scotland as the 17th Space Surveillance Squadron, it operated sensors for the Low-Altitude Space Surveillance System, until its inactivation and the closure of RAF Edzell in 1996. With the inactivation of the 73rd Space Group and closure of RAF Edzell, Scotland, in October 1996, the 5th Space Surveillance Squadron, at RAF Feltwell, United Kingdom incorporated the squadron's mission.

In May 2009, the squadron was converted to provisional status as the 17th Expeditionary Space Control Squadron and assigned to Air Force Space Command to activate or inactivate as needed. Space Command immediately activated the squadron at Peterson Air Force Base, Colorado.

== Lineage ==
- Constituted as the 17th Surveillance Squadron and activated on 1 November 1966 (not organized)

Organized on 1 January 1967
Inactivated on 31 December 1969

- Redesignated 17th Radar Squadron on 20 May 1971

Activated on 1 September 1971
Inactivated on 31 May 1976

- Redesignated 17th Surveillance Squadron on 28 December 1981

Activated on 1 August 1982
Inactivated on 1 June 1989

- Redesignated 17th Space Surveillance Squadron on 25 October 1993

Activated on 15 November 1993
Inactivated on 1 July 1996

- Redesignated 17th Expeditionary Space Control Squadron, converted to provisional status, and activated on 28 May 2009

=== Assignments ===
- Air Defense Command, 1 November 1966 (not organized)
- 73d Aerospace Surveillance Wing, 1 January 1967 – 31 December 1969
- Fourteenth Aerospace Force, 1 September 1971 – 31 May 1976
- 3d Air Division, 1 August 1982
- 1st Space Wing, 1 May 1983 – 1 June 1989
- 73d Space Group, 15 November 1993
- 21st Operations Group, 26 April 1995 – 1 July 1996
- Air Force Space Command to activate or inactivate as needed, 28 May 2009

Attached to 21st Space Wing, 28 May 2009 –

=== Stations ===
- Moorestown, New Jersey, 1 January 1967 – 31 December 1969
- Ko Kha Air Station, Thailand, 1 September 1971 – 31 May 1976
- Naval Station San Miguel, Philippines, 1 August 1982 – 1 June 1989
- RAF Edzell, Scotland, 15 November 1993 – 1 July 1996
- Peterson Air Force Base, Colorado, 28 May 2009 –

=== Decorations ===
- Air Force Outstanding Unit Award
  - 1 October 1995 – 30 September 1997
  - 1 August 1982 – 31 July 1983
  - 14 September 1973 – 17 February 1975
