= Christopher Fernengel =

U.S. Space Force general officer

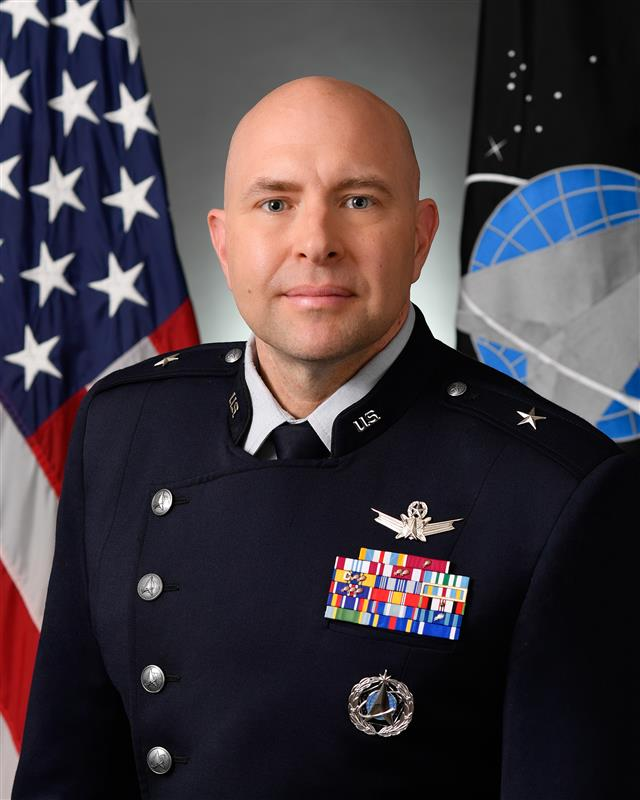
- Born: c. 1978 (age 47–48)
- Education: Ohio University (BA); Trident University International (MBA)
- Military career
- Allegiance: United States
- Branch: United States Air Force: United States Space Force
- Service years: 2001–2021 (Air Force): 2021–present (Space Force)
- Rank: Brigadier General
- Commands: Space Delta 3; 4th Space Control Squadron

Christopher A. Fernengel (born c. 1978) is a United States Space Force brigadier general who serves as the director of plans and programs of the United States Space Force. He served as commander of Space Delta 3 from 2021 to 2023.

In 2025, Fernengel was nominated and confirmed for promotion to brigadier general.

== Military career ==
1. August 2001–May 2002, Student, Undergraduate Space and Missile Training and GPS Initial Qualification Training, 392nd Training Squadron, Vandenberg Air Force Base, Calif.
2. May 2002–December 2003, GPS Operations Crew Commander, 1st Space Operations Squadron, Schriever AFB, Colo.
3. December 2003–December 2004, Alternate Senior Instructor, 50th Operations Support Squadron, Schriever AFB, Colo.
4. December 2004–May 2005, Wing Tactics Officer, 50th Operations Support Squadron, Schriever AFB, Colo.
5. May 2005–January 2007, Space Defense Director Instructor, 1st Space Control Squadron, Cheyenne Mountain Air Force Station, Colo.
6. January 2007–June 2007, Student, USAF Weapons School, Nellis AFB, Nev.
7. June 2007–April 2009, Chief, Weapons and Tactics, 614th Air and Space Operations Center, Vandenberg AFB, Calif.
8. April 2009–April 2010, Chief, SSA Operations Team, 614th Air and Space Operations Center, Vandenberg AFB, Calif.
9. April 2010–July 2011, Commander's Action Group, Headquarters, 14th Air Force, Vandenberg AFB, Calif.
10. July 2011–July 2013, Chief, Weapons and Tactics for Special Technical Operations, Global Operations, U.S. Strategic Command, Offutt AFB, Neb.
11. July 2013–July 2014, Student, Naval Command Staff College, Newport, R.I.
12. July 2014–April 2016, Director of Operations, 527th Space Aggressor Squadron, Schriever AFB, Colo.
13. April 2016–June 2018, Commander, 4th Space Control Squadron, Peterson AFB, Colo.
14. June 2018–June 2019, Student, Marine Corps War College, Quantico, Va.
15. June 2019–March 2020, Chief, Space Forces Requirements Division, Headquarters, U.S. Air Force, the Pentagon, Arlington, Va.
16. March 2020–July 2021, Director, Operational Capability Requirements Directorate, Headquarters, U.S. Space Force, the Pentagon, Arlington, Va.
17. July 2021–June 2023, Commander, Space Delta 3, Peterson Space Force Base, Colo.
18. June 2023–August 2025, Director, Commander's Action Group, U.S. Space Command, Peterson SFB, Colo.
19. August 2025–present, Director, Plans and Programs, Office of the Chief Strategy and Resource Officer, Headquarters Space Force, the Pentagon, Arlington, Va.

== Dates of promotion ==
Rank	Branch	Date
Second Lieutenant	Air Force	May 28, 2000
First Lieutenant	Air Force	May 28, 2000
Captain	Air Force	May 28, 2004
Major	Air Force	December 1, 2009
Lieutenant Colonel	Air Force	December 1, 2013
Colonel	Air Force	January 1, 2020
Colonel	Space Force	~September 30, 2021
Brigadier General	Space Force	July 18, 2025

Military offices
New office	Director of Operational Capability Requirements of the United States Space Force; 2020–2021	Succeeded by Todd Benson
Preceded by John G. Thien	Commander of Space Delta 3; 2021–2023	Succeeded by Nicole M. Petrucci
Preceded by Casey Beard	Director of the Commander’s Action Group of the United States Space Command; 2023–2025	Succeeded by ???
Preceded by Brian Denaro	Director of Plans and Programs of the United States Space Force; 2025–2026	Succeeded by Mark Bigley
