= 16th Electromagnetic Warfare Squadron =

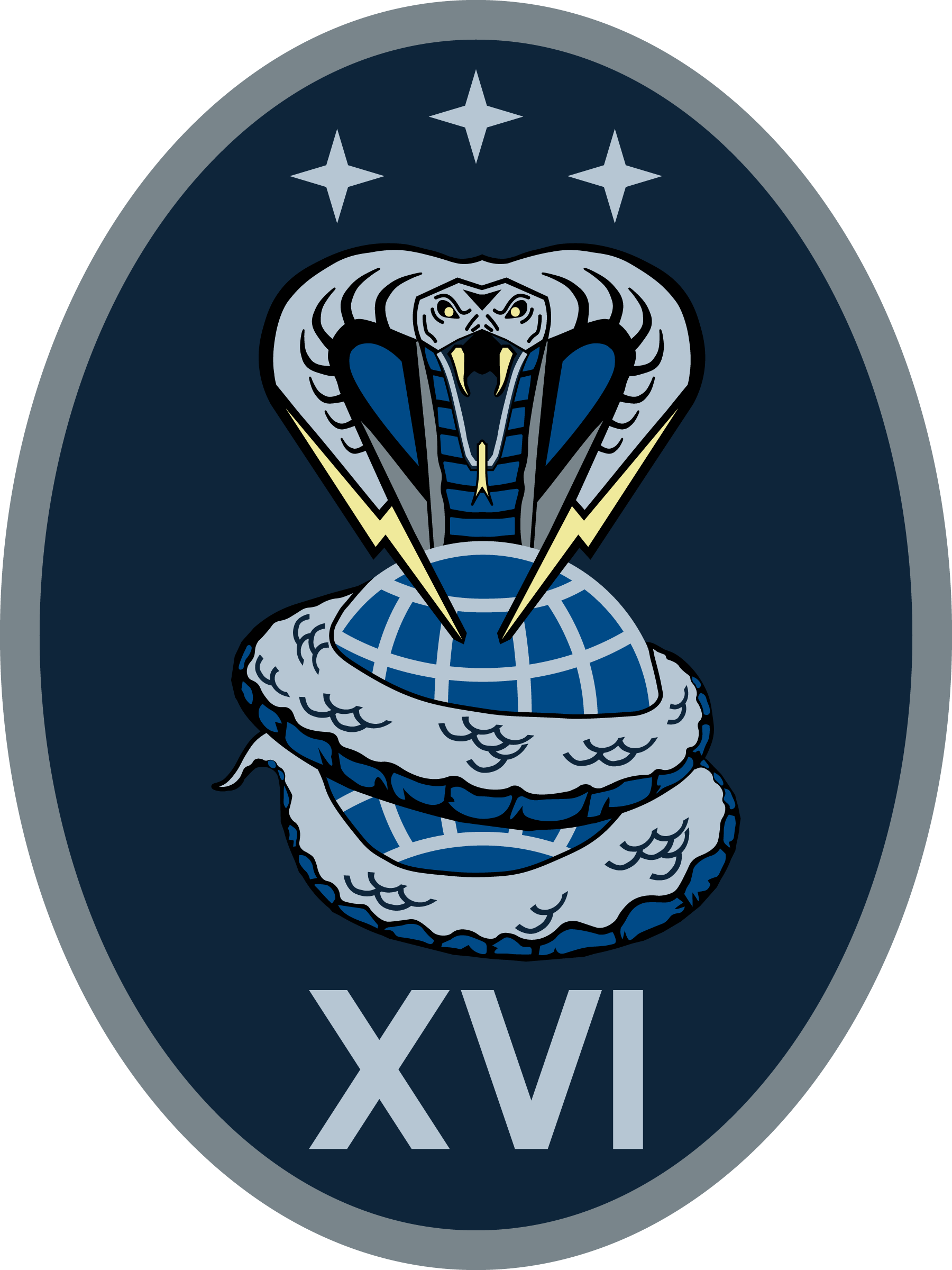
- Emblem of the 16th Electromagnetic Warfare Squadron
- Active: 1967–1994; 2007-Present
- Country: United States
- Branch: United States Space Force
- Role: Detect and report electromagnetic interference with satellite communications systems
- Size: 123
- Part of: Mission Delta 3
- Garrison/HQ: Peterson Space Force Base, Colorado
- Mottos: Tutamine Victoria Latin From a Strong Defense, Victory
- Decorations: Air Force Outstanding Unit Award

Commanders
- Current commander: Lt Col D. J. Thomas

Insignia
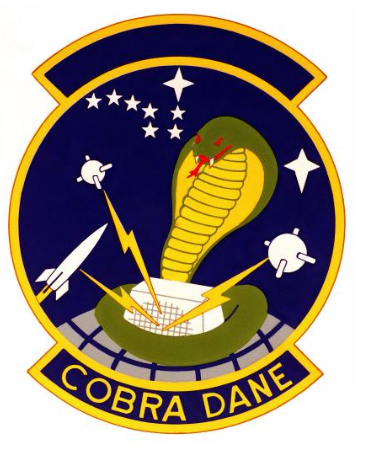
- 16th Surveillance Squadron emblem

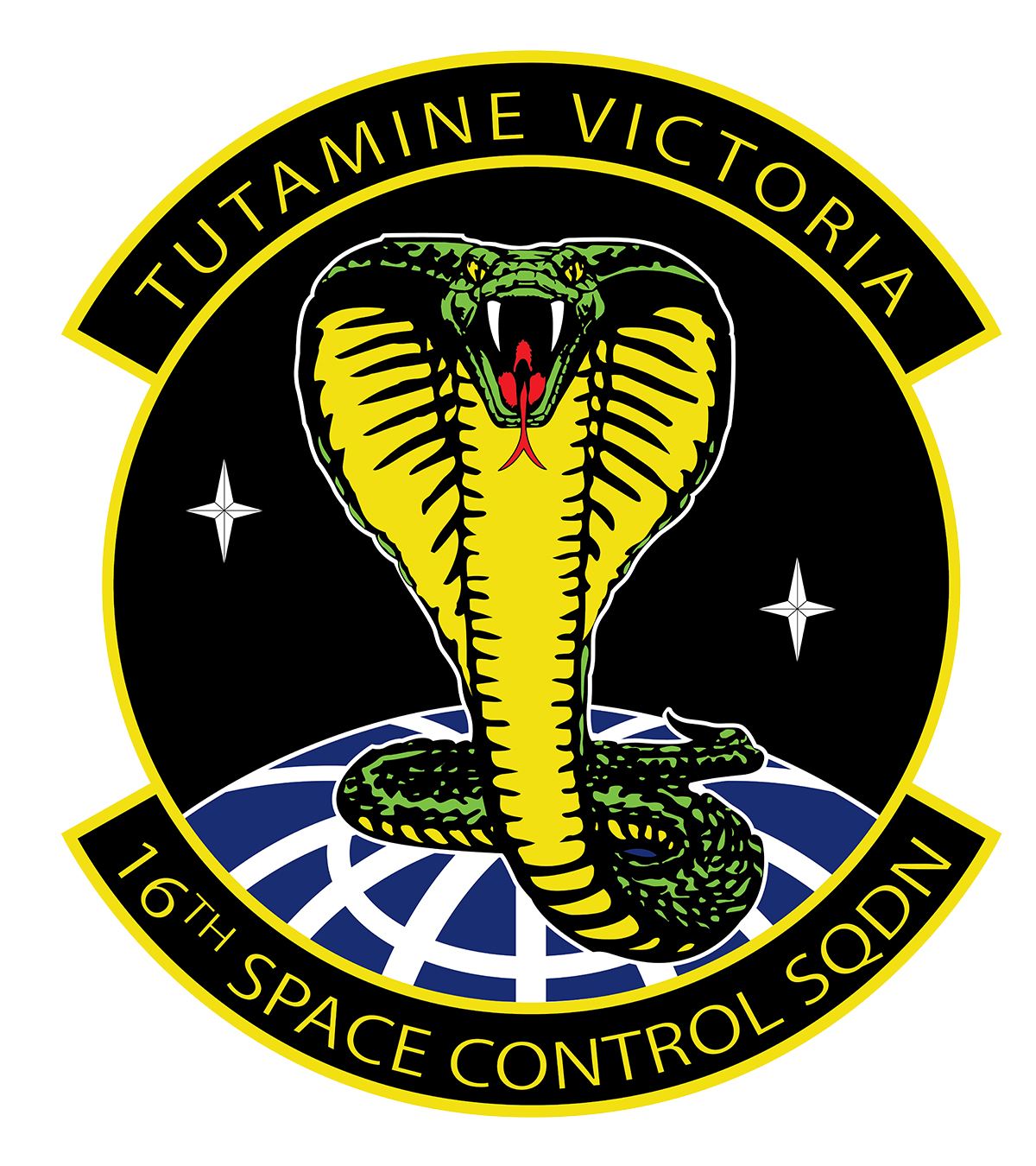
- 16th Space Control Squadron emblem

The 16th Electromagnetic Warfare Squadron (16 EWS) is an active United States Space Force unit, stationed at Peterson Space Force Base, Colorado as part of the Mission Delta 3. The squadron protects critical satellite communication links to detect, characterize, geolocate and report sources of electromagnetic interference on US military and commercial satellites. The squadron also provides combat-ready crews to deploy and employ defensive space electromagnetic warfare capabilities for theater combatant commanders. The squadron is Air Force Space Command's first defensive counterspace unit.

From 1967 through 1994, the squadron, originally the 16th Surveillance Squadron, operated the Cobra Dane space detection system at Shemya Air Force Base, Alaska.

== Mission ==
The 16th Electromagnetic Warfare Squadron operates space electromagnetic warfare capabilities to achieve space superiority in support of theater campaigns and United States Strategic Command's space superiority mission. To achieve this, 16th operates the Rapid Attack Identification Detection Reporting System (RAIDRS) central operating location and up to six RAIDRS fixed ground stations and three deployable ground segments. The unit detects, characterizes, geolocation and electromagnetic interference for satellite communications systems, supporting combatant commanders. 16th SPCS operators can remotely control and task the fixed and deployable antenna suites from Peterson Air Force Base. Additionally, the three deployable systems are capable of sustained autonomous operations if connectivity is lost.

== History ==
=== Cobra Dane operation ===
The squadron was first organized at Shemya Air Force Station, Alaska as the 16th Surveillance Squadron and assigned to the 73d Aerospace Surveillance Wing of Air Defense Command. The unit's mission was to operate the Cobra Dane long-range early warning radar system, used to track Soviet intercontinental ballistic missile launches. In April 1967, the 73d Wing was inactivated and the 16th was assigned directly to Fourteenth Aerospace Force.

The 16th continued its mission under Air (later Aerospace) Defense Command until the command was disestablished in December 1979. Strategic Air Command assumed responsibility for strategic space defense assets and assigned the squadron to its 47th Air Division. The unit was again reassigned in 1983, when the Air Force brought its space defense and communications units under Air Force Space Command, which assigned the squadron to the 1st Space Wing. In 1991, it was reassigned to the 73rd Space Surveillance Group. In 1992, the unit was designated the 16th Space Surveillance Squadron. It was inactivated in 1994.

=== Rapid Attack Identification Detection Reporting System ===
The unit was reactivated at Peterson Air Force Base., Colorado in May 2007 under the 21st Space Wing to operate the Air Force's Rapid Attack Identification Detection Reporting System (RAIDRS).

The RAIDRS prototype, designated the "Satellite Interference Response System" (SIRS), was initially deployed to United States Central Command (USCENTCOM)'s area of responsibility for a 120-day proof of concept. When the proof of concept proved to be a success, SIRS was redesignated RAIDRS Deployable Ground Segment-0 and has been continually deployed to USCENTCOM since then. In 2011, the Bounty Hunter system was delivered to USCENTCOM for added capability and the two comprise Operation Silent Sentry. Airmen from the 16th and its reserve associate, the 380th Space Control Squadron provide the preponderance of the required manpower for this mission.

On 15 April 2022, the 16th Space Control Squadron was redesignated the 16th Electromagnetic Warfare Squadron.

== Lineage ==
- Constituted as the 16th Surveillance Squadron and activated on 1 November 1966 (not organized)

Organized on 1 January 1967
Redesignated 16th Space Surveillance Squadron on 15 May 1992
Inactivated on 1 October 1994

- Redesignated 16th Space Control Squadron on 4 May 2007

Activated on 16 May 2007

- Redesignated 16th Electromagnetic Warfare Squadron on 15 April 2022

=== Assignments ===
- Air Defense Command, 1 November 1966 (not organized)
- 73d Aerospace Surveillance Wing, 1 January 1967
- Fourteenth Aerospace Force, 30 April 1971
- Alaskan Air Defense Region, 1 October 1976
- 47th Air Division, 1 December 1979
- 1st Space Wing, 1 May 1983
- 73d Space Surveillance Group (later 73d Space Group), 1 September 1991 – 1 October 1994
- 21st Operations Group, 16 May 2007 – 24 July 2020
- Space Delta 3, 24 July 2020 – Present

=== Stations ===
- Shemya Air Force Station (later Shemya Air Force Base, Eareckson Air Force Base), Alaska, 1 January 1967 – 1 October 1994
- Peterson Space Force Base, Colorado (2007–Present)

=== Awards ===
Award streamer	Award	Dates	Notes
	Air Force Outstanding Unit Award	1 January 1974 – 31 May 1975	16th Surveillance Squadron
	Air Force Outstanding Unit Award	1 July 1980 – 30 June 1982	16th Surveillance Squadron
	Air Force Outstanding Unit Award	1 May 1983 – 30 April 1984	16th Surveillance Squadron
	Air Force Outstanding Unit Award	1 September 1989 – 31 August 1991	16th Surveillance Squadron
	Air Force Outstanding Unit Award	6 April 1993	16th Surveillance Squadron

== List of commanders ==
- Lt Col Edward Allard, 2007 – 2009
- Lt Col Paul Tombarge, 2009 – 2011
- Lt Col Roger Sherman, 2011 – 2013
- Lt Col Mark Guerber, 2013 – 2015
- Lt Col Thomas Johnson, 2015 – 16 June 2017
- Lt Col Ernest Schmitt, 16 June 2017 – ~25 June 2019
- Lt Col Angelo Fernandez, 25 June 2019 – 25 June 2021
- Lt Col Marshall Tillis, 25 June 2021 – June 2023
- Lt Col D. J. Thomas, June 2023 – May 2025
