= Edzell Woods =

Coordinates: 56.815°N 2.622°W

- Location within Aberdeenshire
- Population: 346
- OS grid reference: NO 621694
- Council area: Aberdeenshire
- Lieutenancy area: Kincardineshire
- Country: Scotland
- Sovereign state: United Kingdom
- Postcode district: DD9
- Dialling code: 01356
- Police: Scotland
- Fire: Scottish
- Ambulance: Scottish
- UK Parliament: West Aberdeenshire and Kincardine
- Scottish Parliament: Angus North and Mearns

Edzell Woods is a village in the Kincardine and Mearns area of Aberdeenshire, Scotland. It is 4 miles (6.4 km) from Edzell by road, but only one mile (1.6 km) directly east, over the River North Esk, which forms the boundary between Aberdeenshire and Angus. In 2010 the population of Edzell Woods was 346. Local council services are provided by Aberdeenshire Council and the Westminster parliamentary constituency is West Aberdeenshire and Kincardine.

== History ==
Edzell Woods is located on part of the old Royal Air Force airfield RAF Edzell. The site was an active airfield for over fifty years, first as a RAF station during the Second World War, and then leased to the United States Navy, from 1960 until its decommissioning in 1996, finally closing in 1997. Following the closure of the base, the houses, airfield, and administrative buildings were put up for sale. The married quarters (houses) were purchased by a developer and individually sold. The airfield & administrative buildings of the base are owned by Carnegie Base Services. Plans have been proposed to create 1,000 additional homes adjacent to Edzell Woods, but are yet to be carried out.

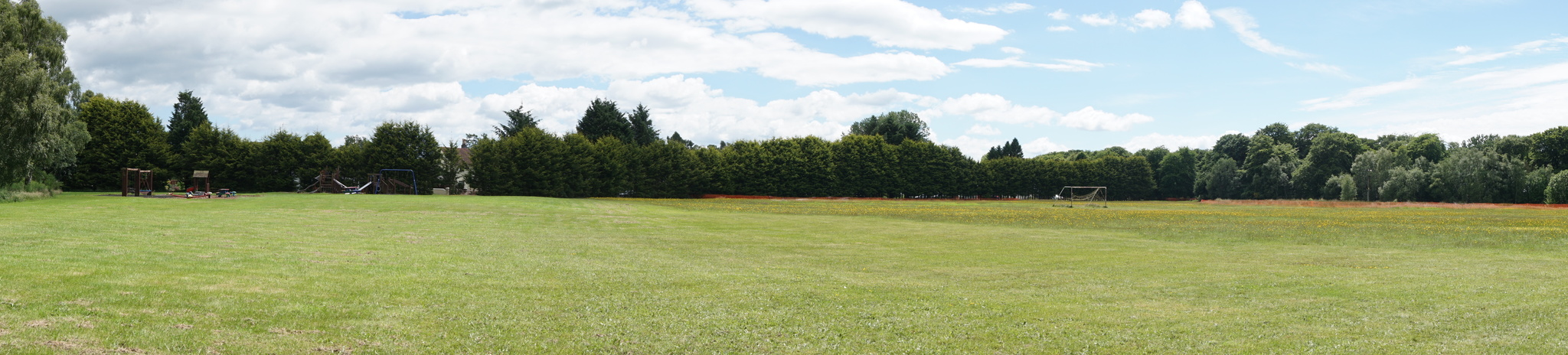

== Services ==
Edzell Woods contains many communal grassed areas, the largest of which is the football field and children's play park. The closest shops to Edzell Woods are in Edzell.

== See also ==
- List of former Royal Air Force stations
