= RAF Edzell =

Former RAF station in Angus, Scotland

RAF Edzell
- Edzell Woods, Aberdeenshire in Scotland
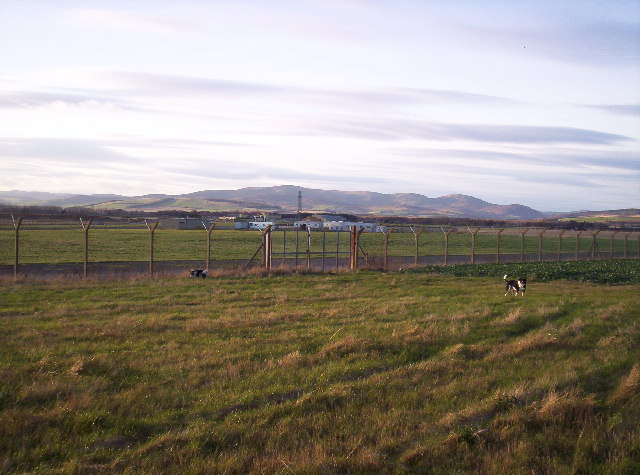
- Former military buildings at former RAF Edzell during 2005

Site information
- Type: Royal Air Force station
- Owner: Ministry of Defence
- Operator: Royal Air Force (1940–1957); United States Navy (1960–1997)

Location
- Location within Aberdeenshire RAF Edzell (the United Kingdom)
- Coordinates: 56°48′44″N 002°36′17″W

Site history
- Built: 1940
- In use: 1940–1957 and 1960–1997
- Fate: Sold for various civilian uses
- Battles/wars: European theatre of World War II; Cold War

Airfield information
Runways
Direction	Length and surface
05/23	1,532 metres (5,026 ft) Asphalt
14/32	1,423 metres (4,669 ft) Asphalt

Royal Air Force Edzell or more simply RAF Edzell is a former Royal Air Force satellite station located in Aberdeenshire, one mile east of Edzell in Angus, Scotland.

It was active for over fifty years, first as a RAF airfield during the Second World War, and later on lease to the United States Navy, from 1960 until its decommissioning in 1996, and final closure in 1997.

It was also home to an AN/FRD-10 Circularly Disposed Antenna Array (CDAA), located in the southern quadrant formed between the crossing of the airfield's two 1,500 m (4,900 ft) runways.

== History ==
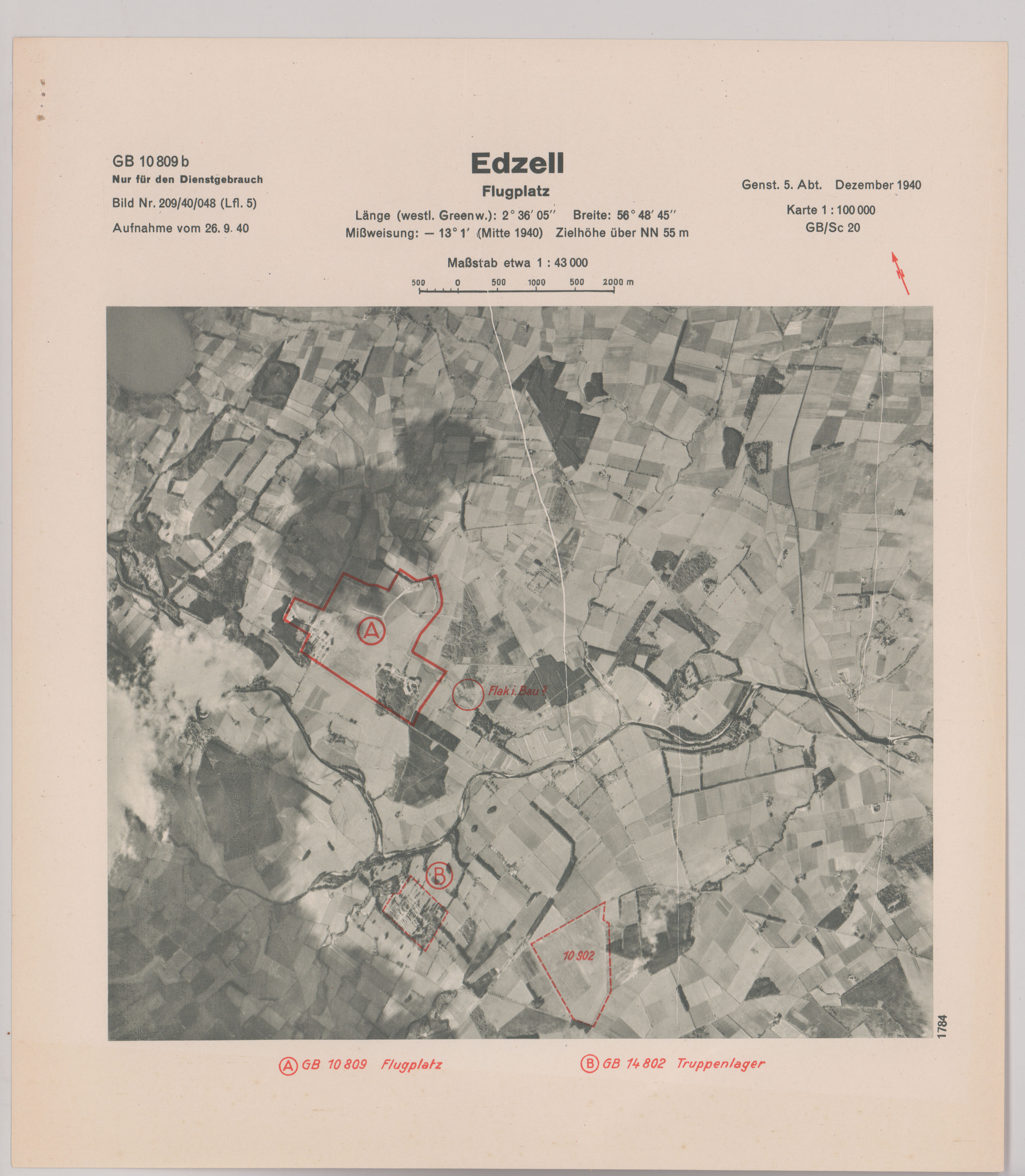
RAF Edzell on a target dossier of the German Luftwaffe, 1940

The airfield was first established to the east of the village during the First World War, and was disbanded in 1919. During the 1930s it operated as a civilian airfield, but the outbreak of the Second World War saw its return to service in 1940, as RAF Edzell. The airfield served as an aircraft maintenance facility, and by the end of the war held some 800 aircraft in reserve.

In the late 1950s the site was used as a motor racing circuit, however only few races were held before it was reopened. One of the last sports car races on the circuit was won by the future double World GP Champion Jim Clark. The last motor racing meeting at Edzell took place on Saturday, 20 June 1959.

RAF Edzell reopened in 1960, forming part of the United States Navy global High Frequency Direction Finding (HFDF) network, used to track various targets around the world. Up to 3,000 personnel were said to have been stationed at RAF Edzell. The ending of the Cold War, and advances in technology rendered the HF network obsolete, and the station closed in October 1997, by which time staffing levels had fallen to 300 local, and 700 military personnel. This marked the end of 37 years of US Navy operations and 85 years of RAF service.

From 1968 to 1978, US Navy staff from RAF Edzell also operated at the site of the Inverbervie CEW Radar Station, located a little over 10 mi (16 km) to the east on the headland at Inverbervie.

£4 million was made available through the Central Challenge Fund over the following three years for a package of measures put forward by Angus and Aberdeenshire Councils, with the support of the Edzell Task Force, to strengthen the local economy following the withdrawal of the US Navy from RAF Edzell.

== Main Units ==
=== 612 Squadron ===
==== Pre-War ====
No. 612 Squadron was formed on 1 June 1937 at RAF Dyce as an army co-operation unit of the Auxiliary Air Force and was initially equipped with two-seat Avro Tutor training aircraft. In December 1937 it had received two-seat Hawker Hectors Army co-operation aircraft, which were retained when the squadron converted from the Army Co-operation to the General Reconnaissance role. In July 1939 the squadron received Avro Ansons which had room for four crew members and had a much better range, making them better suited for the reconnaissance role.

==== Second World War ====
No. 612 Squadron entered the Second World War as a General Reconnaissance unit within RAF Coastal Command, flying the Avro Anson. These were replaced from November 1940 with Armstrong Whitworth Whitleys, and from November 1942 these again gradually made (April 1943 saw the last Whitley leave the squadron) way for various marks of specially adapted General Reconnaissance (GR) versions of the Vickers Wellingtons, which the squadron continued to fly until the end of the war.

The squadron was disbanded on 9 July 1945 at RAF Langham.

==== Post War ====
No. 612 squadron was reformed on 10 May 1946 at RAF Dyce as a fighter squadron of the Royal Auxiliary Air Force. Initially the squadron was equipped with Griffon-engined Supermarine Spitfire F.14s and in November 1948 it got additional Merlin-engined Supermarine Spitfire LF.16e fighters. It converted to de Havilland Vampire FB.5s in June 1951, flying these first from RAF Leuchars and later from RAF Edzell and, when the runway was extended, again from RAF Dyce until disbandment on 10 March 1957, on the same day as all other flying units of the RAuxAF.

Motto: Vigilando custodimus - 'We stand guard by vigilance'

Squadron Codes:

DJ Jul 1939 - Sep 1939

WL Sep 1939 - Aug 1943

8W Jul 1944 - Jul 1945, 1949 - Apr 1951

RAS May 1946 - 1949

=== 17th Space Surveillance Squadron (1982-1996) ===
The 17th Space Surveillance Squadron (17 SSS) was originally constituted as the 17th Radar Squadron (17th RS), and activated, on 1 November 1966. The 17th SS operated a radar sensor for the USAF Spacetrack System, first in New Jersey then later tracking People's Republic of China missile launches and southerly launches from the Soviet Union from Thailand, until its deactivation in May 1976.

It reactivated as the 17th Surveillance Squadron (17th SS) on 1 August 1982, the unit provided low-altitude space surveillance until its subsequent deactivation in June 1989.

It reactivated again in Oct 1993, as the newly designated 17th Space Surveillance Squadron (17th SSS) operated sensors for the Low-Altitude Space Surveillance System, until its final deactivation and closure of RAF Edzell in 1997.

== Units ==
The following units were here at some point:

- No. 5 Gliding School RAF (November 1952 - September 1955) became No. 662 Gliding School RAF (September 1955 - May 1958)
- Relief Landing Ground for No. 8 Advanced Flying Training School RAF (May 1952 - December 1953)
- Relief Landing Ground for No. 8 Service Flying Training School RAF (July 1940 - March 1942) absorbed by No. 2 Flying Instructors School RAF became No. 2 Flying Instructors School (Advanced) RAF (January 1942 - June 1945)
- No. 44 Maintenance Unit RAF (August 1940 - April 1949)
- No. 612 Squadron RAF
- No. 1518 (Beam Approach Training) Flight RAF (June 1943 - August 1944)

== Post closure ==
In 2000 Roger Byron-Collins' Welbeck Estate Group acquired the entire estate of 144 former RAF and USAF Officers and NCO married quarter houses along with the single personnel accommodation blocks and PX buildings at RAF Edzell. This followed through his other Scottish acquisition with the purchase from the MOD's Property Services Agency of the entire Married Quarter housing estate at the former at the Royal Navy facility at Rosyth Edinburgh. Through their sales company Welbeck Homes all the housing was upgraded and sold to local buyers and all the residential part of the estate is in civilian ownership.
