= Mission Delta 3 =

U.S. Space Force electromagnetic warfare unit

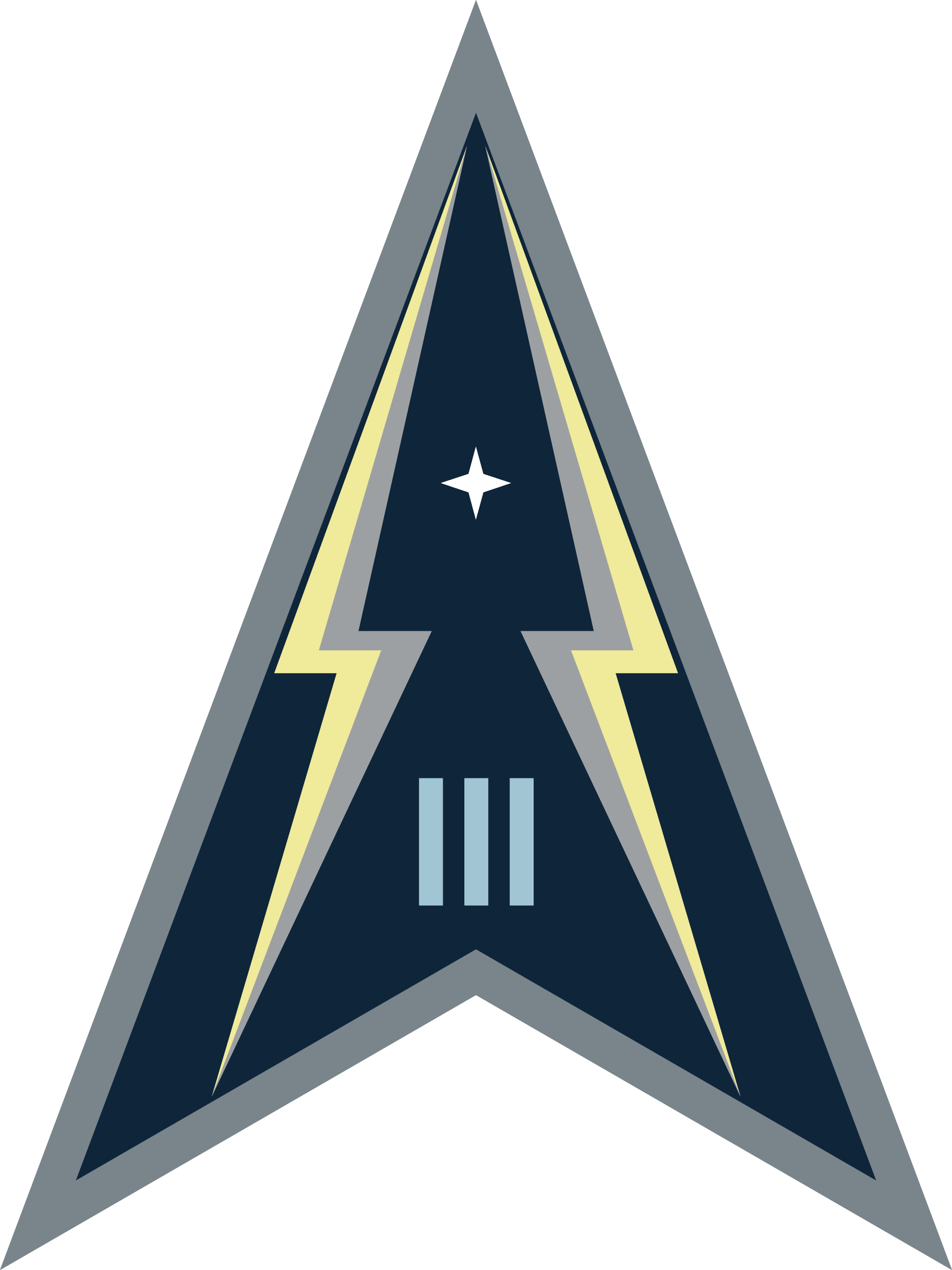
- DEL 3 emblem
- Founded: 1 January 1967; 59 years ago
- Country: United States
- Branch: United States Space Force
- Type: Delta
- Role: Electromagnetic warfare
- Size: 350 personnel
- Part of: United States Space Force Combat Forces Command
- Headquarters: Peterson Space Force Base, Colorado, U.S.
- Website: www.peterson.spaceforce.mil/Units/Space-Delta-3/

Commanders
- Commander: Col Angelo Fernandez
- Deputy Commander: Col Edward M. Gutierrez
- Senior Enlisted Leader: CMSgt Kevin R. Pfister

Insignia
- Guidon

Mission Delta 3 (MD3) is a United States Space Force unit responsible for presenting operational combat-ready electromagnetic warfare forces in support of assigned missions. It is headquartered at Peterson Space Force Base.

Activated on 24 July 2020, it replaced the former 21st Space Wing's 721st Operations Group upon establishment. The 721st Operations Group was activated on 10 October 2019 partly by realigning units from the former 21st Operations Group to focus securing the electromagnetic spectrum for national security space operations. In 2024 it was redesignated Mission Delta 3 and gained sustainment responsibilities, along with organic cyber defense and intelligence forces.

== History ==
On 1 January 1967 the 73d Aerospace Surveillance Wing, joined the 71st Surveillance Wing as one of the two wings in Air Defense Command's 9th Aerospace Defense Division, which was responsible for the Air Force's contribution to the defense of North America to space oriented attack. It was first organized at Ent Air Force Base, Colorado. The 71st Wing, which was soon renamed the 71st Missile Warning Wing, was responsible for the Ballistic Missile Early Warning System, while the 73rd focused on space based systems. The wing's operational elements were the 16th Surveillance Squadron at Shemya Air Force Station, Alaska, the 17th Surveillance Squadron at Moorestown Air Force Station, New Jersey, the 18th Surveillance Squadron at Edwards Air Force Base, California. the 19th Surveillance Squadron at Pirinclik Air Station, Turkey and the 20th Surveillance Squadron at Eglin Air Force Base, all organized the same day as the wing. Like the wing, the component squadrons were to be activated as "aerospace" surveillance squadrons. However, on 3 January 1967, the decision was made to retroactively drop the "aerospace" from the squadron names. Sensor operations included the Spacetrack System. The wing was inactivated in April 1971.

The 73rd was reactivated on 1 March 1989 as the 73d Space Surveillance Group. On 1 October 1992, Detachment 3 at Misawa Air Base, Japan (which had been added on 1 January 1991) was expanded to form the 3rd Space Surveillance Squadron. Its last assignment was with Fourteenth Air Force, being stationed at Falcon Air Force Base, Colorado. It was inactivated on 26 April 1995.

The Group performed space surveillance. In April 1995 the 73d Space Surveillance Group merged with the 21st Space Wing. From that point the 21st became the largest wing in the United States Air Force with units deployed throughout the world.

In December 2021, DEL 3 was awarded as the best delta in Space Operations Command. The delta's three operational units were redesignated as electromagnetic warfare squadrons on April 15, 2022.

In September 2023, General B. Chance Saltzman introduced the integrated mission delta (IMD) construct which combines different functions, like operations, training, intelligence, and cyber effects, into specific mission areas, including electromagnetic warfare. DEL 3 was one of two initial units announced to test the construct. These IMDs mission generation, intelligence support, and cyber defense. In October 2023, the 23rd Electromagnetic Warfare Squadron was activated. In 2024 it was redesignated Mission Delta 3 and gained sustainment responsibilities, along with organic cyber defense and intelligence forces.

== Structure ==
DEL 3 is a component of Space Operations Command, one of eight deltas aligned under the field command. It is composed of the 3rd Combat Training Squadron, which provides advanced training to the delta's members, and three operational units, the 4th Electromagnetic Warfare Squadron, 5th Electromagnetic Warfare Squadron, and 16th Electromagnetic Warfare Squadron. It is also augmented by four Air National Guard units, the 114th Space Control Squadron, 138th Space Control Squadron, 216th Space Control Squadron, and 293rd Space Control Squadron, and the Air Force Reserve's 380th Space Control Squadron

It plans to add a defensive electromagnetic warfare unit in Guam.

Emblem	Name	Function	Headquarters
Squadrons
	3rd Combat Training Squadron (3 CTS)	Operational training and certification, tactics development, engineering support, and crew force management	Peterson Space Force Base, Colorado
	4th Electromagnetic Warfare Squadron (4 EWS)	Electromagnetic warfare	Peterson Space Force Base, Colorado
	5th Electromagnetic Warfare Squadron (5 EWS)	Electromagnetic warfare	Peterson Space Force Base, Colorado
	16th Electromagnetic Warfare Squadron (16 EWS)	Electromagnetic warfare	Peterson Space Force Base, Colorado
	23rd Electromagnetic Warfare Squadron (23 EWS)	Electromagnetic warfare	Peterson Space Force Base, Colorado
	37th Tactical Intelligence Squadron (37 TIS)	Intelligence, surveillance, and reconnaissance	

== Lineage ==
- Established as the 73d Aerospace Surveillance Wing and activated on 1 November 1966

Organized on 1 January 1967
Inactivated on 30 April 1971

- Redesignated 73d Space Surveillance Group on 10 February 1989

Activated on 1 March 1989
Redesignated 73d Space Wing on 1 June 1991
Redesignated 73d Space Group on 1 May 1992
Inactivated on 26 April 1995

== Assignments ==
- Air Defense Command, 1 November 1966 (not organized)
- 9th Aerospace Defense Division, 1 January 1967
- Fourteenth Aerospace Force, 1 July 1968 – 30 April 1971
- Air Force Space Command, 1 March 1989
- 1st Space Wing, 1 June 1991
- Fourteenth Air Force, 20 September 1993 – 26 April 1995

== Stations ==
- Ent Air Force Base, Colorado, 1 January 1967
- Tyndall Air Force Base, Florida, 17 July 1967 – 30 April 1971
- Falcon Air Force Base, Colorado, 1 March 1989 – 26 April 1995

== Components 1967-1995 ==
- 1st Command and Control Squadron: 28 February 1992 – 24 June 1994
- 1st Deep Surveillance Squadron (later, 1st Surveillance Squadron, 1st Space Surveillance Squadron: 1 April 1989 – 26 April 1995
- 3rd Space Surveillance Squadron: 1 October 1992 – 26 April 1995
- 4th Surveillance Squadron (later 4th Space Surveillance Squadron): 1 October 1990 – 26 April 1995
- 5th Surveillance Squadron (later 5th Space Surveillance Squadron): 1 October 1990 – 26 April 1995
- 16th Surveillance Squadron (later 16th Space Surveillance Squadron): 1 January 1967 – 30 April 1971, 1 September 1991 – 1 October 1994
- 17th Surveillance Squadron (later 17th Space Surveillance Squadron): 1 January 1967 – 31 December 1969, 15 November 1993 – 26 April 1995
- 18th Surveillance Squadron (later 18th Space Surveillance Squadron): 1 January 1967 – 30 April 1971, 1 July 1991 – 26 April 1995
- 19th Surveillance Squadron (later 19th Space Surveillance Squadron): 1 January 1967 – 30 April 1971, 1 October 1991 – 26 April 1995
- 20th Surveillance Squadron (later 20th Space Surveillance Squadron): 1 January 1967 – 30 April 1971, 1 August 1991 – 26 April 1995
- 73d Operations Support Squadron: 15 May 1992 – 26 April 1995
- 73d Support Squadron (later 73d Mission Support Squadron): 15 May 1992 – 26 April 1995

=== Detachments ===
- Detachment 1 – San Vito dei Normanni Air Station, Italy (1 October 1989 – 1 October 1990)
- Detachment 2 – RAF Feltwell, United Kingdom (1 October 1989 – 1 October 1990)
- Detachment 3: Misawa Air Base, Japan (1 January 1991 – 1 October 1992)

== List of commanders ==
No.	Commander		Term			Ref
No.	Portrait	Name	Took office	Left office	Duration	Ref
1	John G. Thien	Colonel; John G. Thien	24 July 2020	31 July 2021	1 year, 7 days	
2	Christopher Fernengel	Colonel; Christopher Fernengel	31 July 2021	29 June 2023	1 year, 333 days	
3	Nicole M. Petrucci	Colonel; Nicole M. Petrucci	29 June 2023	7 March 2025	1 year, 251 days	
4	Angelo Fernandez	Colonel; Angelo Fernandez	7 March 2025	Incumbent	1 year, 219 days	

== Bibliography ==
- Cornett, Lloyd H; Johnson, Mildred W. (1980). A Handbook of Aerospace Defense Organization, 1946 - 1980 (PDF). Peterson AFB, CO: Office of History, Aerospace Defense Center.
- Mueller, Robert (1989). Air Force Bases, Vol. I, Active Air Force Bases Within the United States of America on 17 September 1982 (PDF). Washington, DC: Office of Air Force History. ISBN 0-912799-53-6.
- Ravenstein, Charles A. (1984). Air Force Combat Wings, Lineage & Honors Histories 1947-1977 (PDF). Washington, DC: Office of Air Force History. ISBN 0-912799-12-9.
- Information compiled by Daniel L. Haulman, Phd; Chief, Organizational Histories Branch; Air Force Historical Research Agency
