= Sam Johnson (colonel) =

Retired U.S. Air Force officer

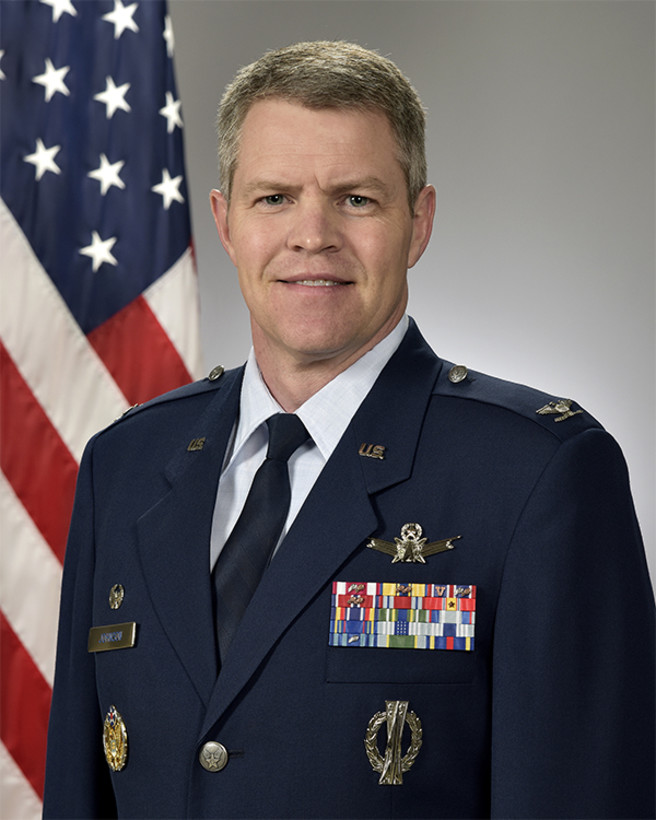
- Military career
- Allegiance: United States
- Branch: United States Air Force
- Service years: 1995–2020 (25 years)
- Rank: Colonel
- Commands: 21st Space Wing; 3rd Space Experimentation Squadron; Offensive Counter Information Flight
- Awards: Meritorious Service Medal (7); Air Force Commendation Medal (3); Air Force Outstanding Unit Award; Air Force Organizational Excellence Award; Combat Readiness Medal

Sam Johnson is a retired colonel in the United States Air Force who last served as the commander of the 21st Space Wing of the Space Operations Command. He was vice commander of the 21st Space Wing before assuming the command on May 12, 2020 after the previous commander, Colonel Thomas Falzarano unexpectedly died.

Johnson is a graduate of the United States Air Force Academy and was commissioned in 1995. During his career, he has served as crew commander on intercontinental ballistic missile and space surveillance crews. In addition, he previously commanded a squadron, an offensive counter information flight, and has served on group, Numbered Air Force, major command, and Headquarters U.S. Air Force staffs.

== Education ==
1995 Bachelor of Science, Astronautical Engineering, U.S. Air Force Academy, Colorado Springs, Colo.
1999 Master of Science, Aerospace Engineering, University of Colorado, Boulder
2001 Squadron Officer School, Maxwell Air Force Base, Ala.
2002 U.S. Air Force Weapons School, Nellis AFB, Nev.
2008 Master of Military Operational Art and Science, Air Command & Staff College, Maxwell AFB, Ala.
2012 Air War College, correspondence

== Assignments ==
1. July 1995 – February 1996, Student, Undergraduate Space and Missile Training, Peacekeeper Intercontintal Ballistic Missile Initial Qualifying Training, Vandenberg AFB, Calif.
2. April 1996 – March 2000, Instructor Deputy Crew Commander, Standardization & Evaluation Crew Commander, Chief Standardization & Evaluation Procedures, Peacekeeper ICBM, 400th Missile Squadron, 90th Operations Group, Francis E. Warren AFB, Wyo.
3. March 2000 – April 2001, Crew Commander and Chief, Operations Training, 3rd Space Surveillance Squadron, Misawa Air Base, Japan
4. May 2001 – June 2002, Executive Officer, 21st Operations Group, Peterson AFB, Colo.
5. July 2002 – December 2002, Student, USAF Weapons School, Nellis AFB, Nev.
6. January 2003 – January 2004, Commander, Offensive Counter Information Flight, 7th Information Warfare Flight, Osan AB, Korea
7. February 2004 – March 2006, Chief, Weapons and Tactics, Operating Location M, Directorate of Requirements, Headquarters Air Force Space Command, Peterson AFB, Colo.
8. March 2006 – June 2006, Chief, Weapons and Tactics, 3rd Space Experimentation Squadron, Schriever AFB, Colo.
9. June 2006 – June 2007, Deputy Chief, Advanced Operations Applications Branch, HQ AFSPC, Peterson AFB, Colo.
10. July 2007 – July 2008, Student, Air Command and Staff College, Maxwell AFB, Ala.
11. July 2008 – June 2010, Chief, Space Protection, Space Control Division, Directorate of Operations, Headquarters U.S. Air Force, Pentagon, Arlington, Va.
12. July 2010 – June 2011, Director of Operations, 3rd Space Experimentation Squadron, Schriever, AFB, Colo.
13. June 2011 – June 2013, Commander, 3rd Space Experimentation Squadron, Schriever AFB, Colo.
14. June 2013 – May 2014, Chief, Senior Leader Management Division, Directorate of Manpower, Personnel and Services, HQ AFSPC, Peterson AFB, Colo.
15. May 2014 – July 2016, Chief, Special Programs, HQ AFSPC; Exercise Director, National Space Defense Center, Peterson AFB, Colo.
16. August 2016 – June 2018, Chief, Integrated Experiments and Evaluations Division, Space Vehicles Directorate, Air Force Research Lab, Kirtland AFB, N.M.
17. June 2018 – May 2020, Vice Commander, 21st Space Wing, Peterson AFB, Colo.
18. May 2020 – July 2020, Commander, 21st Space Wing, Peterson AFB, Colo.

== Effective dates of promotion ==
Rank	Date
Second lieutenant	May 31, 1995
First lieutenant	May 31, 1997
Captain	May 31, 1999
Major	August 1, 2005
Lieutenant colonel	July 1, 2010
Colonel	September 1, 2016

Military offices
Preceded by Thomas Falzarano	Commander of the 21st Space Wing; May 2020–July 2020	Unit inactivated
