= 5th Electromagnetic Warfare Squadron =

- Emblem of the 5th Electromagnetic Warfare Squadron
- Country: United States
- Branch: United States Space Force
- Type: Space Electromagnetic Warfare
- Part of: Space Delta 3
- Garrison/HQ: Peterson Space Force Base, Colorado
- Motto: We plea the fifth!
- Decorations: AFOUA

Commanders
- Current commander: Lt Col Andy Wang
- Notable commanders: John W. Raymond

Insignia
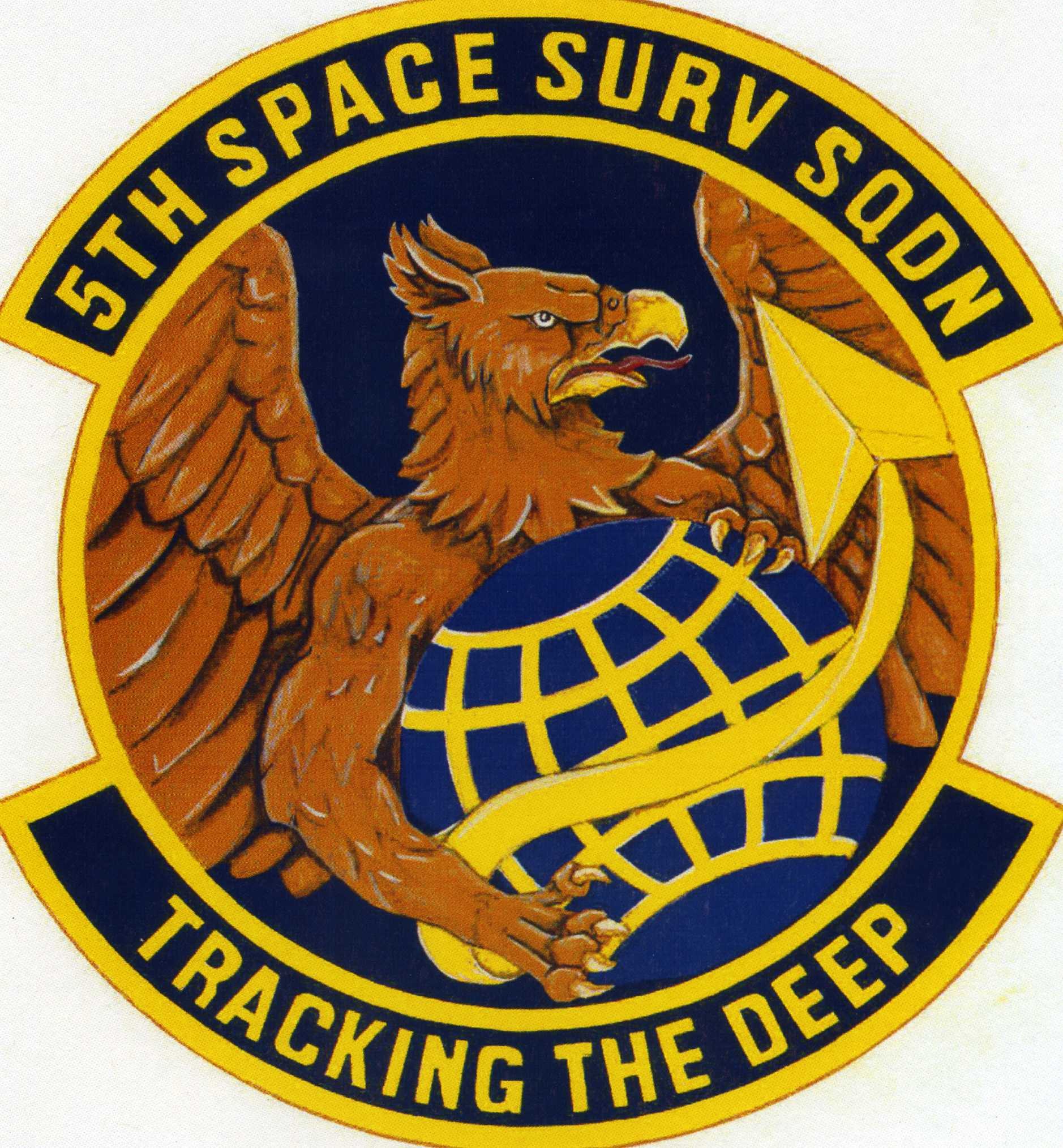
- Emblem of the 5th Space Surveillance Squadron

The United States Space Force's 5th Electromagnetic Warfare Squadron (5 EWS) is a space electromagnetic warfare unit located at Peterson Space Force Base, Colorado.

== Mission ==
The mission of the 5 EWS is to provide flexible and responsive space control capabilities to the Commander U.S. Space Command in order to protect and defend national security space capabilities.

== History ==
The dual LASS/DSTS operation supported USAF space intelligence requirements, while being assisted by the 18th Intelligence Squadron's Det 4 for SIGINT support. This coverage augmented worldwide coverage of space signals activities at similarly equipped sites at Misawa AB, Japan, Osan AB, Republic of Korea and at Griffiss AFB in the United States.

The Deep Space Tracking System uses sensitive, highly accurate 20-foot dish antennas to detect and track S-band radio signals transmitted by radio beacons on most satellites. There were DSTS receivers located at Griffiss AFB, New York; RAF Feltwell, Great Britain; and Misawa AB, Japan.

The 5 SSS was inactivated in 2003, with administration of RAF Feltwell transferred to Detachment 4, 18th Intelligence Squadron.

On 15 April 2022, the 5th Space Control Squadron was redesignated the 5th Electromagnetic Warfare Squadron.

== Previous designations ==
- 5th Space Control Squadron (2019–2022)
- 5th Space Surveillance Squadron (1989–2003)

== Bases stationed ==
- RAF Feltwell, United Kingdom (1989–2003)

== List of commanders ==
- Lt Col Ronald P. Mitchell, 1 October 1990 – ???
- Lt Col James L. Burling, Jr., August 1994 – 28 September 1996
- Lt Col Steven R. Prebeck, 28 September 1996 – ???
- Lt Col John Amrine, June 1999 – July 2000
- Lt Col John W. Raymond, April 2000 – June 2001
- Lt Col Susan Bedell, 10 October 2019 – June 2021
- Lt Col Alexander Courtney, June 2021 – June 2023
- Lt Col Andy Wang, June 2023 – present

== Equipment operated ==
- Low Altitude Space Surveillance (LASS) (1989–2003)
- Deep Space Tracking System (DSTS) (1989–2003)

== See also ==
- 1st Space Surveillance Squadron
- 3d Space Experimentation Squadron
- 18th Intelligence Squadron
- 21st Space Wing

== Decorations ==
- Air Force Outstanding Unit Award
  - 1 January 2000 – 31 August 2001
  - 1 January 1999 – 31 December 1999
  - 1 January 1998 – 31 December 1998
  - 1 October 1997 – 30 September 1999
  - 1 October 1995 – 30 September 1997
