= 544th Intelligence, Surveillance and Reconnaissance Group =

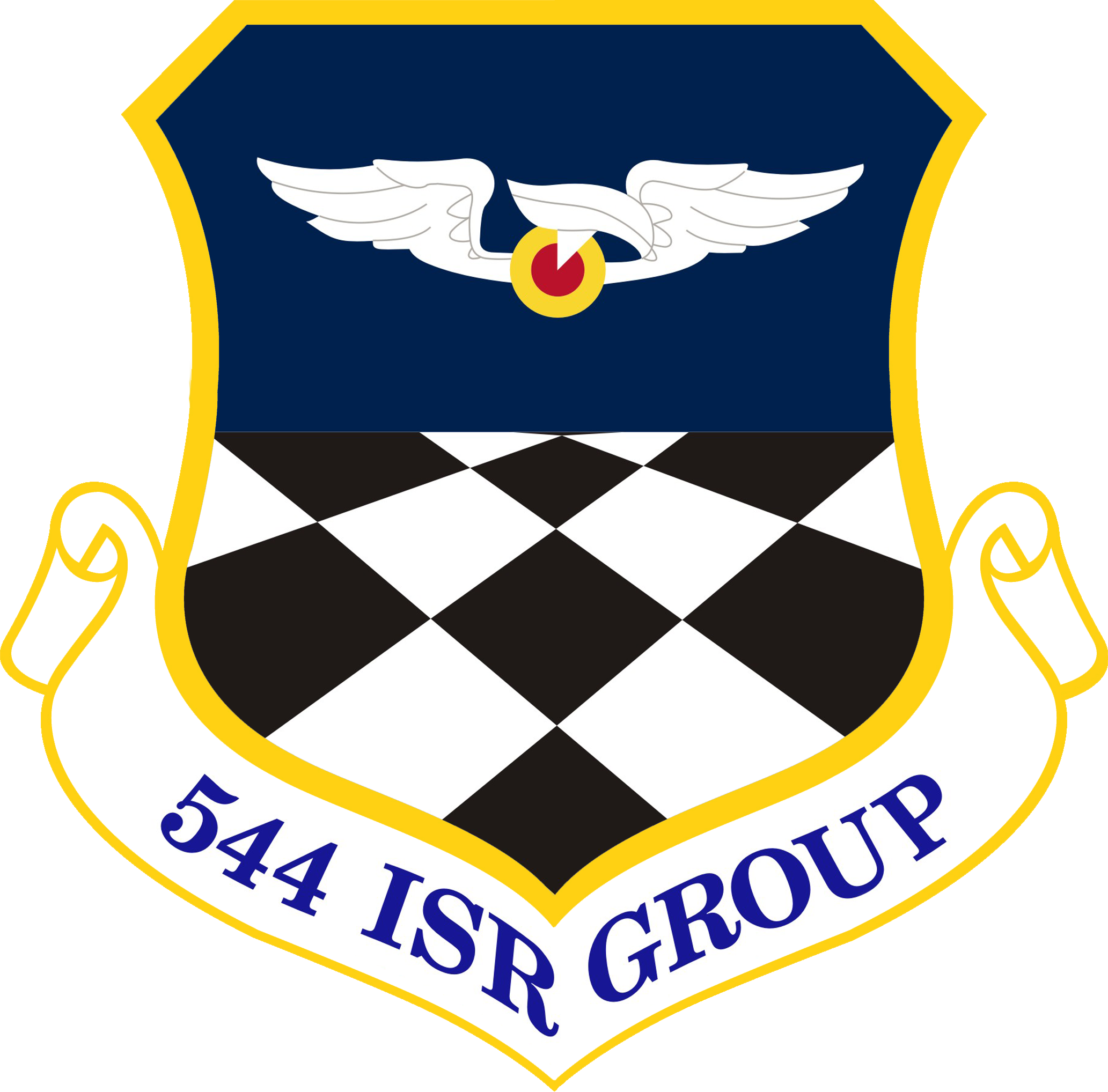
- Group emblem
- Active: 1958–1992; 1992–2020; 2022 – present
- Country: United States
- Branch: United States Air Force
- Type: Dependant group
- Role: Space based intelligence and cryptologic operations
- Part of: 70th Intelligence, Surveillance and Reconnaissance Wing
- Base: Buckley Space Force Base, Colorado
- Decorations: Air Force Outstanding Unit Award; Air Force Outstanding Unit Award with Combat V

The 544th Intelligence, Surveillance and Reconnaissance Group is a United States Air Force unit assigned to the Air Combat Command Sixteenth Air Force. It is stationed at Buckley Space Force Base, Colorado. It was reactivated under the 70th Intelligence, Surveillance, and Reconnaissance Wing on 26 September 2022.

A multi-domain intelligence organization, the 544th is a team of approximately 400 Air Force members executing overhead technical signals and infrared intelligence with tradecraft development to achieve mission outcome success in all circumstances.

== History ==
The 544th Intelligence, Surveillance and Reconnaissance Group was initially activated as the 544th Reconnaissance Technical Squadron on 16 November 1950 at Bolling Air Force Base. Initial personnel came from the 4203rd Photographic Technical Squadron. The 544th moved to Offutt Air Force Base, Nebraska in April 1952, although a small unit (Detachment 1) continued operation at Bolling. On 11 July 1958, the unit was redesignated the 544th Reconnaissance Technical Group. The 544th provided photo interpretation during the Cuban Missile Crisis (October 1962) for the National Command Authority.

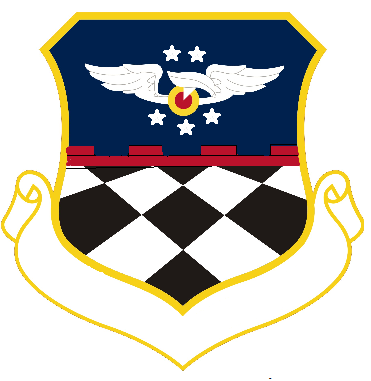
544th Aerospace Reconnaissance Technical Wing emblem

The next designation was as the 544th Aerospace Reconnaissance Technical Wing when it was redesignated on 1 January 1963. It was assigned directly to Strategic Air Command. In Vietnam, the Boeing RC-135C reconnaissance aircraft, equipped with the ASD-1 reconnaissance system, a number of programmable SIGINT receivers, created much of the 544th Wing's work, an activity known as 'Finder'.

Personnel from the 544th Air Reconnaissance Technical Wing at Offutt AFB, then the highest-level strategic planning office in the U.S. Air Force, have corroborated reports that the Israel Defense Forces knew they were attacking an American ship during the 1967 USS Liberty incident. Captain Steve Forslund, an intelligence analyst, recalled: "The ground control station stated that the target was American and for the aircraft to confirm it. The aircraft did confirm the identity of the target as American, by the American flag. The ground control station ordered the aircraft to attack and sink the target and ensure they left no survivors. [I remembered] the obvious frustration of the controller over the inability of the pilots to sink the target quickly and completely. He kept insisting the mission had to sink the target, and was frustrated with the pilots' responses that it didn't sink." He wasn't the only member of his unit to have read the transcripts: "Everybody saw these." His recollections are supported by 2 other USAF intelligence specialists who were working in separate locations. One is James Ronald Gotcher, who was then serving with the Air Force Security Service's 6924th Security Squadron (an adjunct of the National Security Agency at Son Tra in Vietnam): "It was clear that the Israeli aircraft were being vectored directly at USS Liberty. Later, around the time Liberty got off a distress call, the controllers seemed to panic and urged the aircraft to 'complete the job' and get out of there." Captain Richard Block, an Air Force intelligence officer in Crete who commanded more than 100 analysts and cryptologists monitoring Middle Eastern communications as part of the 6931st Security Group, has also confirmed that radio transcripts proved the Israelis knew they were striking a U.S. ship: "[The transcripts] were teletypes, way beyond Top Secret. Some of the pilots did not want to attack. The pilots said, 'This is an American ship. Do you still want us to attack?' And ground control came back and said, 'Yes, follow orders.'" Gotcher and Forslund agreed with Block that a transcript published by The Jerusalem Post was not the same one they saw. Gotcher noted, "There is simply no way that [the Post's transcript is] the same as what I saw. More to the point, for anyone familiar with air-to-ground [communications] procedures, that simply isn't the way pilots and controllers communicate." Block observed that, "the fact that the Israeli pilots clearly identified the ship as American and asked for further instructions from ground control appears to be a missing part of that Jerusalem Post article."

In 1979 the 544th was designated as a Major Command Special Activity and on 15 October 1979, was redesignated the 544th Strategic Intelligence Wing. The 544th was redesignated the 544th Intelligence Wing on 1 September 1991, still at Offutt, and then inactivated on 1 June 1992.

On 7 September 1993, Colonel Eric Larson became the commander of the newly reactivated 544th Intelligence Group at Peterson Air Force Base, Colorado, part of Air Force Intelligence Command. Colonel Maurizio Calabrese assumed command of the 544th on 27 June 2018. In 2000, the 544th received one of its many Air Force Outstanding Unit Award. The award did not extend to the detachments' host commands such as the Naval Security Group Activities Sabana Seca and Sugar Grove. Their support in terms of infrastructure, technical equipment and facilities, allowed the detachments to accomplish their mission. The group also provided support to Detachment 45 of the Air Force Technical Applications Center. The group was inactivated on 24 July 2020 when it was replaced by Space Delta 7 of the United States Space Force.

On 26 September 2022, the group was reactivated as a part of Air Combat Command with the headquarters at Buckley Space Force Base, Colorado under the command of Colonel Ronald Hopkins. Airmen at the 544th Intelligence, Surveillance and Reconnaissance Group execute overhead technical signals intelligence and overhead persistent infrared operations. They partner with base agencies to produce integrated intelligence that is critical to the security of the United states. The group is composed of three squadrons (566th Intelligence Squadron, 18th Intelligence Squadron, 26th Intelligence Squadron), all located at Buckley Space Force Base, as well as one detachment in Australia.

== Lineage, assignments, and stations ==
=== Lineage ===
- Constituted as the 544th Reconnaissance Technical Squadron on 2 November 1950

Activated on 16 November 1950
Redesignated 544th Reconnaissance Technical Group on 11 July 1958
Redesignated 544th Aerospace Reconnaissance Technical Wing on 1 January 1963
Redesignated 544th Strategic Intelligence Wing on 15 October 1979
Redesignated 544th Intelligence Wing on 1 September 1991
Inactivated on 1 June 1992

- Redesignated 544th Intelligence Group on 3 September 1993

Activated on 7 September 1993
Redesignated 544th Information Operations Group on 1 August 2000
Redesignated 544th Intelligence Group on 1 April 2007
Redesignated 544th Intelligence, Surveillance, and Reconnaissance Group on 1 January 2009
Inactivated on 24 July 2020
Activated on 26 September 2022

=== Assignments ===
- 3902d Air Base Wing, 16 November 1950
- Strategic Air Command, 11 July 1958 – 1 June 1992
- Air Force Intelligence Command (later Air Intelligence Agency), 7 September 1993
- 67th Intelligence Wing (later 67th Information Operations Wing), 31 January 2000
- 70th Intelligence Wing (later 70th Intelligence, Surveillance, and Reconnaissance Wing), 5 July 2006 – 24 July 2020
- 70th Intelligence, Surveillance, and Reconnaissance Wing, 26 September 2022 – present

=== Components ===
Squadrons

- 18th Intelligence Squadron, 7 September 1993 – 24 July 2020, September 2022 – present (Note: Stationed at Wright-Patterson Air Force Base, Ohio 1993-2020. Dollman, TSG David (18 October 2016). "Factsheet 18 Intelligence Squadron (ACC)". Air Force Historical Research Agency.)
- 26th Intelligence Squadron, Colorado, September 2022 – present
- 451st Intelligence Squadron, 1 October 2004 – 31 January 2008 (Note: Stationed at – RAF Menwith Hill, United Kingdom.Haulman, Daniel L. (26 January 2015). "Factsheet 451 Intelligence Squadron (ACC)". Air Force Historical Research Agency.)
- 544th Defensive Intelligence Squadron, by 1978 – 1 June 1992
- 544th Intelligence Analysis Squadron, 1 October 1973 – unknown
- 544th Intelligence Exploitation Squadron, 1 October 1973 – unknown
- 544th Intelligence Support Squadron, by 1978 – 1 June 1992
- 544th Offensive Intelligence Squadron, by 1978 – 1 June 1992
- 544th Target Materials Squadron, 1 October 1973 – 1 June 1992
- 566th Intelligence Squadron, September 2022 – present

Detachments

- Detachment 1 – Bolling Air Force Base, District of Columbia, 12 April 1952 – unknown
- Detachment 2 – Sabana Seca, Puerto Rico, 1 January 1995 – 21 July 2000
- Detachment 3 – Sugar Grove, West Virginia, 1 January 1995 – unknown
- Detachment 4 – Yakima Research Station, Washington, 1 January 1995 – unknown
- Detachment 5 – Chantilly, Virginia, 5 December 1995 – unknown
- Detachment 7 – Vandenberg Air Force Base, California, unknown – unknown

=== Stations ===
- Bolling Air Force Base, District of Columbia, 16 November 1950
- Offutt Air Force Base, Nebraska, 12 April 1952 – 1 June 1992
- Peterson Air Force Base, Colorado, 7 September 1993 – 24 July 2020
- Buckley Space Force Base, Colorado, 26 September 2022 – Present

== Decorations ==
- Air Force Outstanding Unit Award with "V" Device
- Air Force Outstanding Unit Award

== List of commanders ==
- Col Jason B. Lamb, July 2016–June 2018
- Col Maurizio Calabrese, June 2018–June 2020
- Col Ronald Hopkins, September 2022 – present

== See also ==
- List of United States Air Force Groups
