= Colonel Ned Stark =

U.S. Air Force colonel

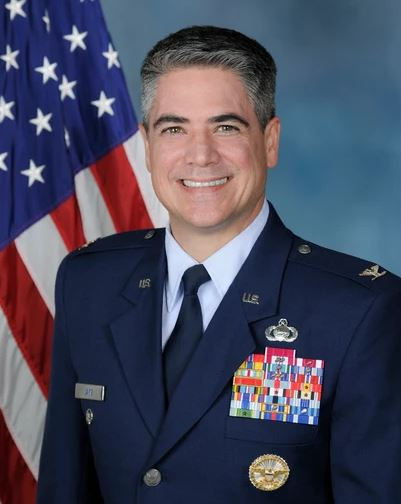
- Official portrait, c. 2018
- Born: Jason Bradford Lamb c. 1972 (age 53–54); West Bloomfield, Michigan
- Relatives: Rowan Lamb (Daughter)
- Military career
- Allegiance: United States
- Branch: United States Air Force
- Service years: 1995–2020
- Rank: Colonel
- Commands: 544th Intelligence, Surveillance and Reconnaissance Group

Jason Bradford Lamb (born c. 1972), more widely known publicly by his pseudonym Colonel Ned Stark, is a retired United States Air Force colonel and master intelligence officer who gained prominence after writing a series of columns critical of the U.S. Air Force's commissioned officer promotion system, especially as it pertains to promotions to lieutenant colonel, colonel, and general officer, and the command leadership positions filled by incumbents of those ranks. His writing became widely read that General David L. Goldfein, then the Chief of Staff of the United States Air Force, wrote back in another column, offering him a job and assuring him that his critical writing is safe.

He served for over 25 years in the U.S. Air Force, commissioning into the service after graduating from the United States Air Force Academy. When writing the columns, he was the Director of Intelligence, Analysis, and Innovation at Headquarters, Air Education and Training Command. He has also commanded the 544th Intelligence, Surveillance and Reconnaissance Group of the 70th Intelligence, Surveillance and Reconnaissance Wing His personal decorations include multiple awards of the Legion of Merit, Bronze Star Medal, Defense Meritorious Service Medal, and Meritorious Service Medal. He also completed multiple combat deployments to Afghanistan and Iraq in support of Operation Enduring Freedom and Operation Iraqi Freedom.

Before his retirement, he revealed his identity in May 2019, a year after starting to write his columns. He now works as the United States Space Force's Talent Strategist and wrote the Guardian Ideal.

Military offices
Preceded by ???	Commander of the 544th Intelligence, Surveillance and Reconnaissance Group; 2016–2018	Succeeded by Maurizio Calabrese
