= 4th Electromagnetic Warfare Squadron =

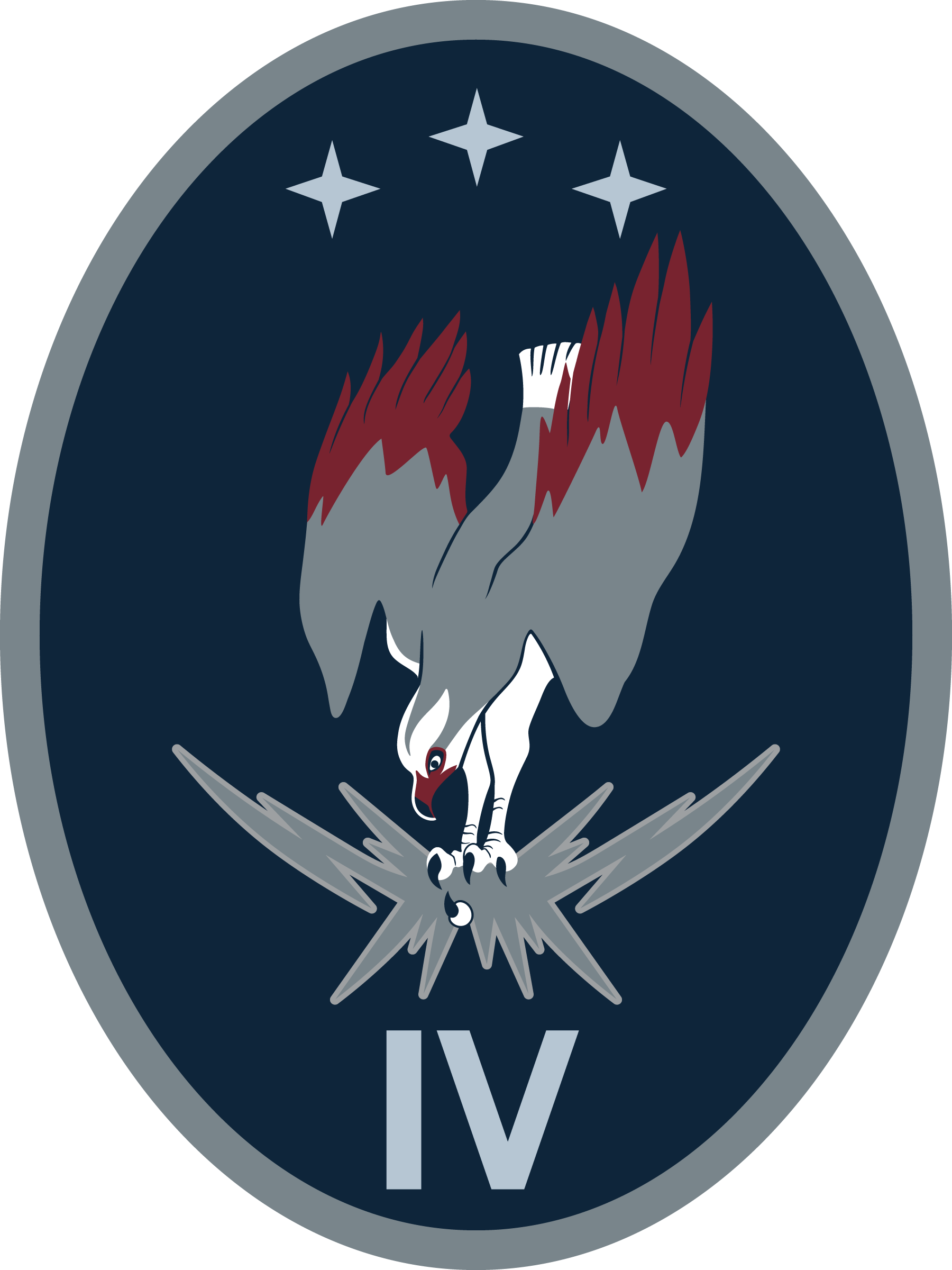
- Emblem of the 4th Electromagnetic Warfare Squadron
- Active: 1990–present
- Country: United States
- Branch: United States Space Force
- Type: Squadron
- Role: Control of Offensive Counterspace Systems
- Part of: Space Delta 3
- Garrison/HQ: Peterson Space Force Base, Colorado, U.S.
- Nickname: Warhawks
- Mottos: One Swoop, One Kill
- Decorations: Air Force Outstanding Unit Award

Commanders
- Current commander: Lt Col Ryan W. Skilling

Insignia
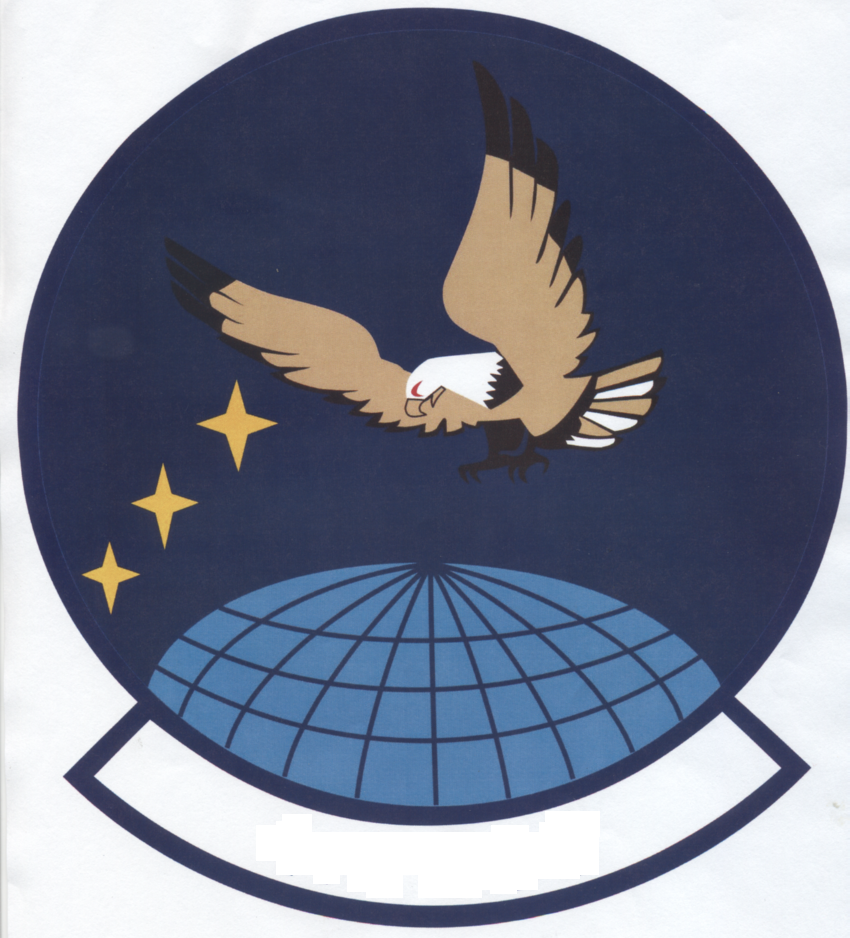
- 4th Space Control Squadron emblem (approved 5 June 1995) (Note: Blazon: Azure, a demi-globe issuant from base Celeste, gridlined Azure below an eagle volant proper above in dexter base three mullets of four in bend sinister Or, all within a diminished border of the third. Haulman Factsheet, 4 Space Control Squadron.)

The United States Space Force's 4th Electromagnetic Warfare Squadron (4 EWS) is an offensive space electromagnetic warfare unit formerly located at Holloman Air Force Base, New Mexico, stood up operations 1 July 2014 at Peterson Space Force Base, Colorado.

== Mission ==
The 4th Electromagnetic Warfare Squadron is a Space Operations Command unit responsible for delivering offensive counterspace and space situational awareness, as appropriate, to rapidly achieve flexible and versatile effects in support of global and theater campaigns.

The squadron provides combat space superiority effects to the Commander, Combined Force Space Component Command (CFSCC) and theater Combatant Commanders through operation of the Counter Communications System.

== History ==
The unit initially activated at Lackland Air Force Base, Texas in October 1990 as the 4th Surveillance Squadron, when it replaced Detachment 2, of the 694th Electronic Security Wing and assumed its personnel and equipment. (Note: Detachment 2 was a space systems training unit for Electronic Security Command. Its origins were with Detachment 2, 6960th Electronic Security Wing, which was organized in September 1986. When the 6960th was inactivated in October, the detachment was replaced by Detachment 2, Headquarters, Continental Electronic Security Division, which was replaced in turn by Detachment 2, Headquarters, Space Electronic Security Division in May 1988. It came under the 694th Electronic Security Wing in May 1989. Peterson AFB Factsheet, 4th Space Control Squadron.)

The Low Altitude Space Surveillance system (LASS) was activated by Air Force Space Command in October 1990. The unit was named the 4th Surveillance Squadron. One year later, it was redesignated as the 4th Space Surveillance Squadron. During this time, the unit continued to perform a research and development mission and a mission to train newly assigned LASS operators until April 1993. The 4th SPSS also performed mobile space surveillance communications and space data relay.

The squadron was assigned to the 73d Space Surveillance Group and in April 1995 merged with the 21st Space Wing. In April 1996, the unit moved operations from its home at Lackland AFB, Texas, to Holloman AFB, New Mexico, before relocating to Peterson AFB, Colorado in 2011. The unit was redesignated as the 4th Space Control Squadron in February 2003. The 4th transitioned to a counterspace mission in July 2005, and activated its first Counter Communications System on 11 April 2006.

From late 2002 until May 2003 the squadron deployed 56 members to support Operation Iraqi Freedom to provide data relay and other space communications for theater commanders.

Squadron members deployed to the 379th Expeditionary Operations Support Squadron along with other 21st Space Wing units to support Operation Silent Sentry and the Rapid Attack Identification Detection and Reporting System (RAIDRS) in Southwest Asia. Formerly known as the SATCOM Interference Response System (SIRS), Silent Sentry began simply as a proof of concept but grew into a fully operational system that supported the Combined Air and Space Operations Center's ability to command and control its forces. The system was Air Force Space Command's first deployable defensive counterspace weapon system. Their efforts earned them the 2006 Air Force Association Citation of Honor for "outstanding contribution of an organization to the development of aerospace power for the betterment of mankind."

On 15 April 2022, the 4th Space Control Squadron was redesignated the 4th Electromagnetic Warfare Squadron.

== Lineage ==
- Constituted as the 4th Surveillance Squadron on 26 September 1990
- Activated on 1 October 1990
- Redesignated 4th Space Surveillance Squadron on 15 May 1992
- Redesignated 4th Space Control Squadron on 1 March 2003
- Redesignated 4th Electromagnetic Warfare Squadron on 15 April 2022

=== Assignments ===
- 73d Space Surveillance Group (later 73 Space Group), 1 October 1990
- 21st Operations Group, 26 April 1995 – October 2019
- 721 Operations Group, October 2019- 23 July 2020
- Space Delta 3, 24 July 2020 – present

=== Stations ===
- Lackland Air Force Base, Texas, 1 October 1990
- Holloman Air Force Base, New Mexico, 16 April 1996
- Peterson Space Force Base, Colorado, July 2014 – present

=== Systems Operated ===
- Counter Communications System (2006 – present)
- Low Altitude Space Surveillance System (1986–2006)

=== Decorations ===
- Air Force Outstanding Unit Award

1 January 1999 – 31 December 1999
1 January 2000 – 31 August 2001
1 October 2005 – 30 September 2007

== List of commanders ==
- Lt Col James G. Lee, ~1996
- Lt Col Cameron Bowser, 1996 – 1998
- Lt Col Jonathan Watkins, 1998 – 2000
- Lt Col Stephen M. Tanous, 2000 – 2002
- Lt Col James Wolf, ~2002 – 2004
- Lt Col Fred W. Gaudlip, 2004 – 2006
- Lt Col Daniel A. Dant, 2006 – 2008
- Lt Col Carl M. Jones, 2008 – 2010
- Lt Col E. Marcus Caughey, 2010 – 2012
- Lt Col Scott D. Brodeur, 6 July 2012 – June 2014
- Lt Col Eric Lingle, 11 July 2014 – ~April 2016
- Lt Col Christopher A. Fernengel, April 2016 – June 2018
- Lt Col William D. Sanders, June 2018 – ~16 June 2020
- Lt Col Kara L. Sartori, 16 June 2020 – 15 June 2022
- Lt Col Nicholas R. Shaw, 15 June 2022 – 7 June 2024
- Lt Col Ryan W. Skilling, 7 June 2024 – present

== See also ==
- 21st Space Wing
- 76th Space Control Squadron
