= Minuscule 721 =

- New Testament manuscript
- Text: Gospel of Mark, Gospel of Luke
- Date: 12th century
- Script: Greek
- Now at: Austrian National Library
- Size: 28.7 cm by 21.8 cm
- Type: Byzantine text-type
- Category: V
- Note: –

Minuscule 721 (in the Gregory-Aland numbering), Θ^{ε25} (von Soden), is a Greek minuscule manuscript of the New Testament, on parchment. Palaeographically it has been assigned to the 12th century. Scrivener labelled it as 826^{e}.

== Description ==
The codex contains the text of the Gospel of Mark and Gospel of Luke, on 502 parchment leaves (size 28.7 cm by 21.8 cm).

The text is written in one columns per page, 25 lines per page.

The manuscript contains lists of the κεφαλαια before each Gospel. The text is divided according to the κεφαλαια (chapters), whose numbers are given at the margin of the text and their τιτλοι (titles) are given at the top. The text is also divided according to the Ammonian Sections (in Mark 234 Sections, the last section in 16:15), whose numbers are given at the margin, but without references to the Eusebian Canons.

It contains a commentary of Theophylact.

== Text ==
The Greek text of the codex is a representative of the Byzantine text-type. Kurt Aland placed it in Category V.

It was not examined by using to the Claremont Profile Method.

== History ==
Gregory dated the manuscript to the 12th century. Currently the manuscript is dated by the INTF to the 12th century.

It was added to the list of New Testament manuscripts by Scrivener (826) and Gregory (721). Gregory saw the manuscript in 1887.

It was examined by Bessarion and Sambucky.

At present the manuscript is housed at the Austrian National Library (Theol. gr. 90) in Vienna.

== See also ==
- List of New Testament minuscules
- Biblical manuscript
- Textual criticism
