= NGC 721 =

Galaxy in the constellation Andromeda

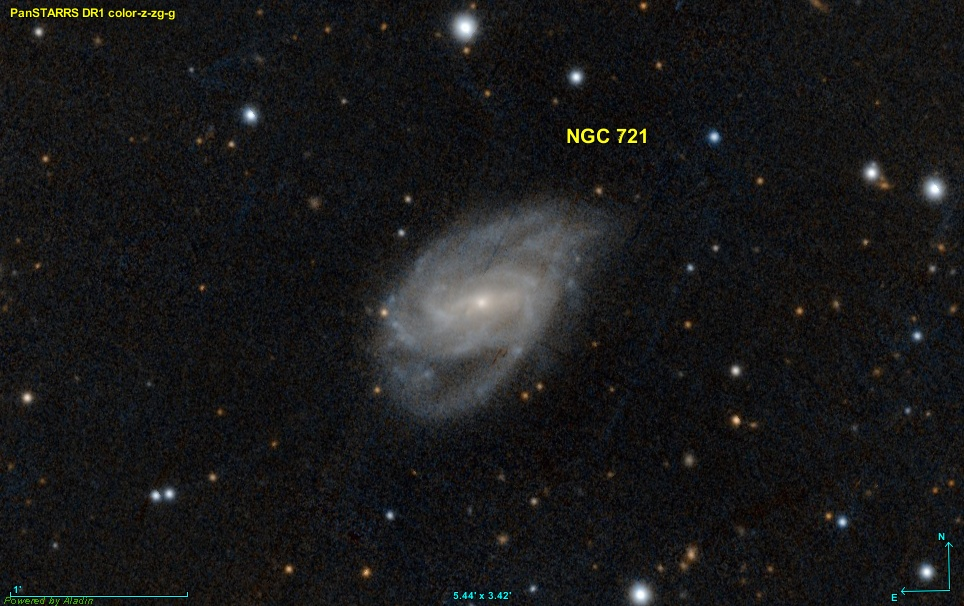
- Pan-STARRS image of NGC 721

Observation data (J2000 epoch)
- Constellation: Andromeda
- Right ascension: 01^{h} 54^{m} 45.45687^{s}
- Declination: +39° 23′ 00.7702″
- Redshift: 0.018566
- Heliocentric radial velocity: 5514 km/s
- Distance: 182.6 Mly (55.98 Mpc)
- Apparent magnitude (B): 13.8

Characteristics
- Type: SB(rs)bc

Other designations
- UGC 1376, MCG 06-05-043, PGC 7097

NGC 721 is a barred spiral galaxy located in the constellation Andromeda about 250 million light years from the Milky Way. It was discovered by the Prussian astronomer Heinrich d'Arrest in 1862.

== See also ==
- List of NGC objects (1–1000)
