= 3d Combat Training Squadron =

U.S. Space Force unit

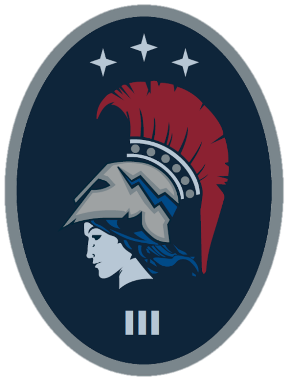
- Squadron emblem
- Active: 3 March 2022 – present
- Country: United States
- Branch: United States Space Force
- Type: Squadron
- Role: Combat Training
- Size: Squadron
- Part of: Space Delta 3
- Headquarters: Peterson Space Force Base, Colorado, U.S.
- Nickname: Warriors
- Motto: "Warriors First!"

Commanders
- Commander: Lt Col Michael Beaver

Insignia
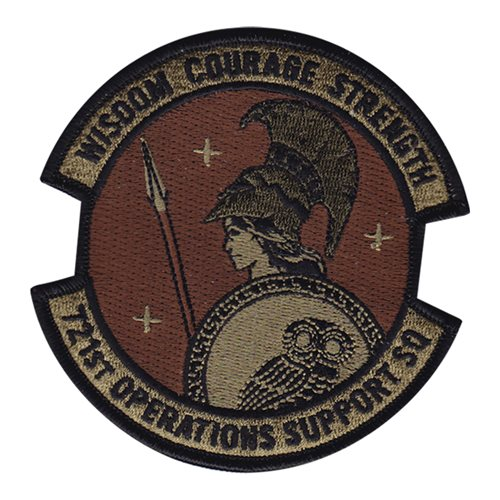
- Former 721st Operations Support Squadron patch

The 3d Combat Training Squadron (3 CTS) is a United States Space Force training unit. Assigned to Space Operations Command's Space Delta 3, it provides electromagnetic warfare qualification training to Delta 3 operators. Headquartered at Peterson Space Force Base, Colorado, it was activated on 3 March 2022. The squadron was previously designated as the 721 Operations Support Squadron following the establishment of the 721st Operations Group in 2019 which was later redesignated to Space Delta 3.

== History ==
The mission of the 3 CTS was originally executed under the 21st Operations Support Squadron (21 OSS), which was responsible for providing training, operations, intelligence, and security support to Air Force Space Command's electromagnetic warfare and missile warning units. Air Force Space Command made the decision to separate the electromagnetic warfare and missile warning mission sets in 2019. Missile Warning units would continue to receive operational support from the 21 OSS and support to electromagnetic warfare units would be provided by the 721 OSS.

The 721 OSS was constituted on 17 September 2019 and activated on 10 October 2019. The 721 OSS was changed from a unit of the United States Air Force armed force to a United States Space Force armed force on 21 October 2020 following the creation of the United States Space Force. The 721 OSS was redesignated at the 3 CTS on 3 March 2022 with its alignment under Space Delta 3.

== List of Commanders ==
- Lt Col Matthew S. Thompson, 10 October 2019 - 18 June 2021
- Lt Col Etan D. Funches, 18 June 2021 - 2 June 2023
- Lt Col Christopher M. Higgins, 2 June 2023 - 18 June 2025
- Lt Col Michael Beaver, 18 June 2025 - present

== See also ==
- Space Delta 3
