= Rapid Attack Identification Detection Reporting System =

The Rapid Attack Identification Detection Reporting System, also known as RAIDRS, is a ground-based space control system that provides near real-time event detection.

== Mission ==
RAIDRS will be a family of systems being designed to detect, report, identify, locate, and classify attacks against military space assets. RAIDRS will include detection sensors, information processors, and a reporting architecture. The RAIDRS system will detect and report attacks on both ground and space-based elements of operational space systems. It will notify operators and users, and carry information to decision-makers

== Block 10 ==
- Worldwide network of sensors; Centralized management
- Detect, Identify, Characterize SATCOM EMI interference
- Identify signal characteristics
- Geo-locate SATCOM EMI (Electro-Magnetic Interference)
- Report interference on blue space systems and/or services

== Block 20 ==
- Commander's decision support tool that provides Defensive Counterspace (DCS) attack assessment
- Integrates and processes critical Space Situation Awareness (SSA) information to provide the integrated space picture that enables DCS operations
- Multi-level distributed data fusion; Advanced visualization

== Contract Information ==
The RAIDRS system is unique in the acquisitions process for being tailored to small businesses and utilizing commercial off-the-shelf (COTS) hardware and software.

According to the Air Force budget, the service intends to spend about $16 million in 2005 on the RAIDRS program; $16.4 million in 2006; $12.1 million in 2007; $12.4 million in 2008; and $66.6 million in 2009.

Contractor: Kratos Defense & Security Solutions

== Locations ==
- Peterson AFB, Colorado (2007–present) (Central Operating Location)
