= 18th Intelligence Squadron =

18th Intelligence Squadron
- Active: 1943–1945; 1951; 1993–2020; 2022–present
- Country: United States
- Branch: United States Air Force
- Role: Military intelligence
- Part of: Air Combat Command
- Garrison/HQ: Buckley Space Force Base, Colorado
- Nickname: Silver Bullet
- Motto: America's Silver Bullet
- Engagements: Global war on terrorism
- Decorations: Air Force Outstanding Unit Award with Combat "V" Device; Air Force Outstanding Unit Award

Commanders
- Current commander: Maj Ryan Laine

Insignia
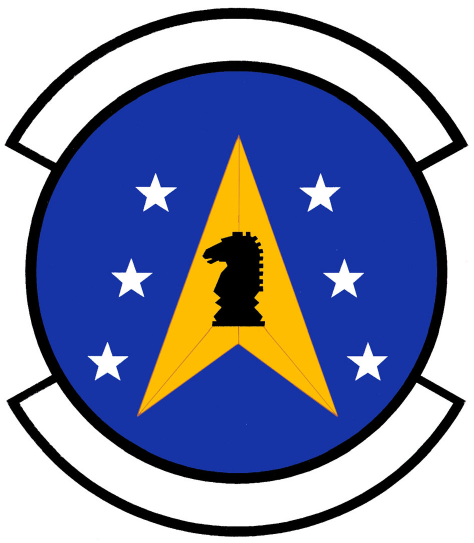
- 18th Intelligence Squadron emblem (approved 24 August 1995)

The 18th Intelligence Squadron is an intelligence organization of the United States Air Force, located at Buckley Space Force Base, Colorado.

== History ==
=== World War II ===
The squadron was originally activated as the 5th Photographic Laboratory Section on 20 October 1943 at Will Rogers Field, Oklahoma. While training at Esler Field, Louisiana, it was redesignated as the 5th Photographic Technical Unit on 30 November 1944 and as the 18th Photographic Technical Unit on 29 January 1945.

The 18th moved overseas in the spring of 1945, arriving in Nancy/Azelot Airfield, France, little more than a month before V-E Day, on 22 March 1945. It was inactivated on 27 December 1945 at Bad Kissingen Airfield, Germany. In these early years, the unit served in the United States, France, and Germany.

=== Strategic Air Command ===
The 68th Reconnaissance Technical Squadron was activated on 10 October 1951 at Lockbourne Air Force Base, Ohio as an original element of the 68th Strategic Reconnaissance Wing, which was located at Lake Charles Air Force Base, Louisiana, and began to equip with Boeing B-29 Superfortresses borrowed from other units. However, before the end of the year, Strategic Air Command decided to change the 68th Wing mission to bombardment and the squadron was inactivated on 10 December 1951.

=== Redesignation and intelligence operations ===
On 16 October 1984, the 18th Photographic Technical Unit and the 68th Reconnaissance Technical Squadron were consolidated as the 18th Reconnaissance Technical Squadron, but the consolidated unit remained inactive. It was redesignated the 18th Intelligence Squadron on 3 September 1993 and activated on 7 September 1993 at Falcon Air Force Base, Colorado, drawing its personnel and equipment from a detachment of a United States Air Force Security Service unit, which was discontinued.

73rd Intelligence, Surveillance, and Reconnaissance Squadron
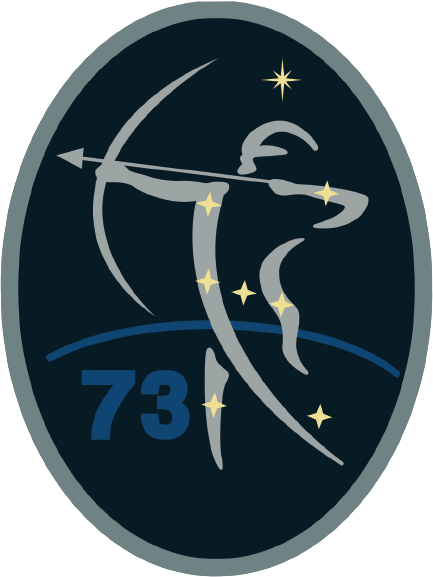
- Active: 2022-present
- Country: United States
- Branch: United States Space Force
- Type: Intelligence, Surveillance, and Reconnaissance
- Size: Squadron
- Garrison/HQ: Wright-Patterson Air Force Base, Ohio

Commanders
- Current commander: Lt. Col. Daniel Robinson

The squadron's Detachment 1 was organized at Holloman Air Force Base, New Mexico in June 1995, and moved to Wright-Patterson Air Force Base, Ohio during the summer of 2000. Detachment 1 was the Air Intelligence Agency's only transportable system conducting radio frequency phenomenology studies. Detachment 1 was discontinued on 8 June 2010 and merged with the 18th Intelligence Squadron, which moved from Vandenberg Air Force Base, California to Wright-Patterson. Assigned personnel provide data in support of Air Force Intelligence, Surveillance, and Reconnaissance Agency, National Air and Space Intelligence Center, and United States Strategic Command missions as well as information critical to the National Security Agency and other national-level organizations.

The squadron provided intelligence for the planning, development, and execution of space control operations. The squadron consisted of a headquarters element at Wright-Patterson Air Force Base, Ohio and two geographically separated detachments: Detachment 2, Osan Air Base, Korea; and Detachment 4, RAF Feltwell, United Kingdom.

The 18th was assigned to the 544th Intelligence, Surveillance and Reconnaissance Group, of Twenty-Fifth Air Force of Air Combat Command. Through fixed and mobile sites, it provided scientific and technical collection to National Security Agency, Air Force Materiel Command, and the 21st Space Wing, Passive Space Surveillance mission. Where available, it also provided limited analysis to the entities.

The squadron was inactivated in August 2020 and then replaced by the United States Space Force 73rd Intelligence, Surveillance and Reconnaissance Squadron which assigned to Space Delta 7.

On 26 September 2022, the 18th Intelligence Squadron was reactivated as a part of the 544th Intelligence, Surveillance and Reconnaissance Group at Buckley Space Force Base, Colorado under the command of Major Ryan Laine.

== Lineage ==
18th Photographic Technical Unit

- Constituted as 5 Photo Lab Section on 9 October 1943

Activated on 20 October 1943
Redesignated 5th Photographic Technical Unit on 30 November 1944
Redesignated 18th Photographic Technical Unit on 29 January 1945
Inactivated on 27 December 1945
Consolidated with the 68th Reconnaissance Technical Squadron as the 18th Reconnaissance Technical Squadron on 16 October 1984

18th Intelligence Squadron

- Constituted as the 68th Reconnaissance Technical Squadron and activated on 18 October 1951

Inactivated on 27 December 1951
Consolidated with the 18th Photographic Technical Unit as the 18th Reconnaissance Technical Squadron on 16 October 1984

- Redesignated 18th Intelligence Squadron on 3 September 1993

Activated on 7 September 1993
Inactivated c. 18 August 2020
Activated c. 26 September 2022

=== Assignments ===
- 76th Tactical Reconnaissance Group, 20 October 1943
- 69th Tactical Reconnaissance Group, 19 April 1944
- XII Tactical Air Command, 23 June–27 December 1945
- 68th Strategic Reconnaissance Wing, 18 October–10 December 1951
- 544th Intelligence Group (later 544th Information Operations Group, 544th Intelligence, Surveillance, and Reconnaissance Group), 7 September 1993–September 2020
- 544th Intelligence, Surveillance and Reconnaissance Group, 26 September 2022 – present

=== Stations ===
- Will Rogers Field, Oklahoma, 20 October 1943
- Thermal Army Air Field, California, 26 November 1943
- Esler Field, Louisiana, 8 May 1944
- Key Field, Mississippi, c. 29 January–26 Feb 1945
- Nancy-Azelot Airfield (A-95), France, 22 March 1945
- Haguenau (Y-39), France, 3 April 1945
- Mannheim-Sandhofen Airfield (Y-79), Germany, 13 July 1945
- Darmstadt-Griesheim Airfield (Y-76), Germany, 19 September 1945
- Bad Kissingen Airfield, Germany, 5–27 December 1945
- Lockbourne Air Force Base, Ohio, 10 October 1951 – 10 December 1951
- Falcon Air Force Base (later Schriever Air Force Base), Colorado, 7 September 1993
- Vandenberg Air Force Base, California, 1 November 2004
- Wright-Patterson Air Force Base, Ohio June 2010
- Buckley Space Force Base, Colorado c. September 2022

=== Component elements ===
- Detachment 1 – Holloman Air Force Base, New Mexico, June 1995 – 2000
- Detachment 1 – Holloman Air Force Base, New Mexico, 2000 – 8 June 2010 (Note: Detachments and Operating Locations are not units, but components of a unit. AF Instruction 38-101, Manpower and Organization, Air Force Organization, 31 January 2017, para 4.3.3 Therefore, they have no independent lineage and are not related, even when they have the same name.)
- Detachment 1 – Vandenberg AFB, California, Summer 2013 – September 2020

Wright-Patterson Air Force Base, Ohio, (31 Aug 2000 – 8 June 2010) Griffiss Air Force Base, New York, 7 September 1993 – 31 August 2000

- Detachment 2 – Osan Air Base, Republic of Korea, 1 January 1994 – unknown
- Detachment 3 – Misawa Air Base, Japan, 1 January 1994 – 30 June 2002
- Detachment 4 – RAF Feltwell, United Kingdom, 1 January 1994 – September 2020
- Detachment 5 – RAF Edzell, Scotland, 1 January 1994 – 20 September 1997
- Detachment 6 – Holloman AFB, New Mexico, 1 April 1995 – 15 June 1995 (redesignated Detachment 1)
- Operating Location VN – Vandenberg Air Force Base, California, 8 June 2010 – Summer 2013

== List of commanders ==
- Lt Col Marco Escalera
- Lt Col Nathaniel A. Peace, 2020 – 7 July 2022
- Lt Col Jeffrey Coverdale, 7 July 2022 – 2023
- Lt Col Christopher Seidler, 2023 – July 2024
- Lt Col Daniel Robinson, July 2024
