= 3rd Test and Evaluation Squadron =

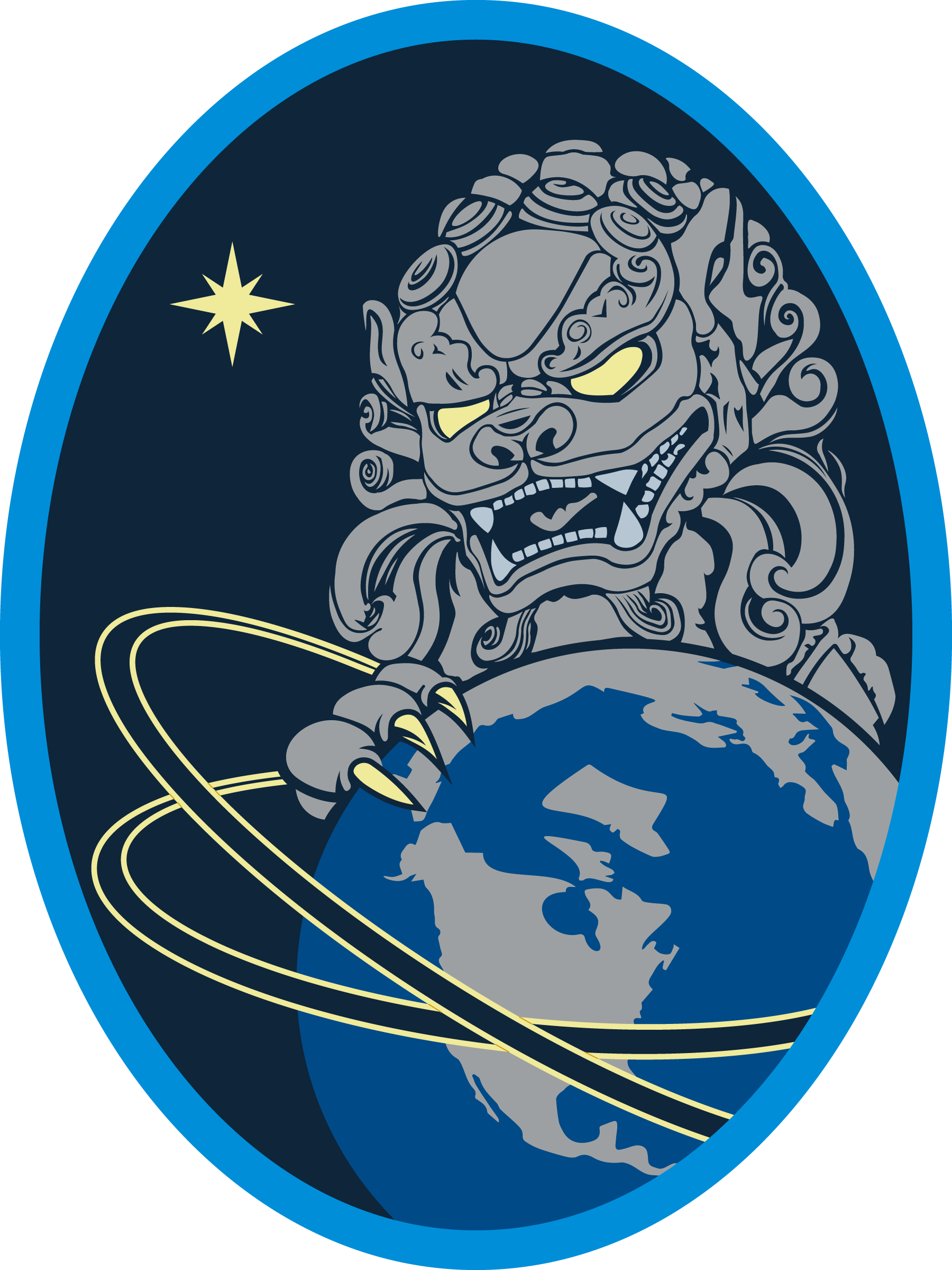
- Squadron emblem
- Active: 1990 – 2002; 2006 – present
- Country: United States
- Branch: United States Space Force
- Type: Space operations
- Role: Technology experimentation, demonstration, and test
- Part of: Space Delta 12
- Home base: Schriever Space Force Base, Colorado
- Motto: "Unequalled excellence"
- Mascot: Komainu (Japanese for 'guardian lion-dog')
- Systems: EELV Secondary Payload Adapter; X-37B Orbital Test Vehicle
- Decorations: Air Force Outstanding Unit Award
- Website: Official website

Commanders
- Current commander: Lt Col Weston Hanoka

Insignia
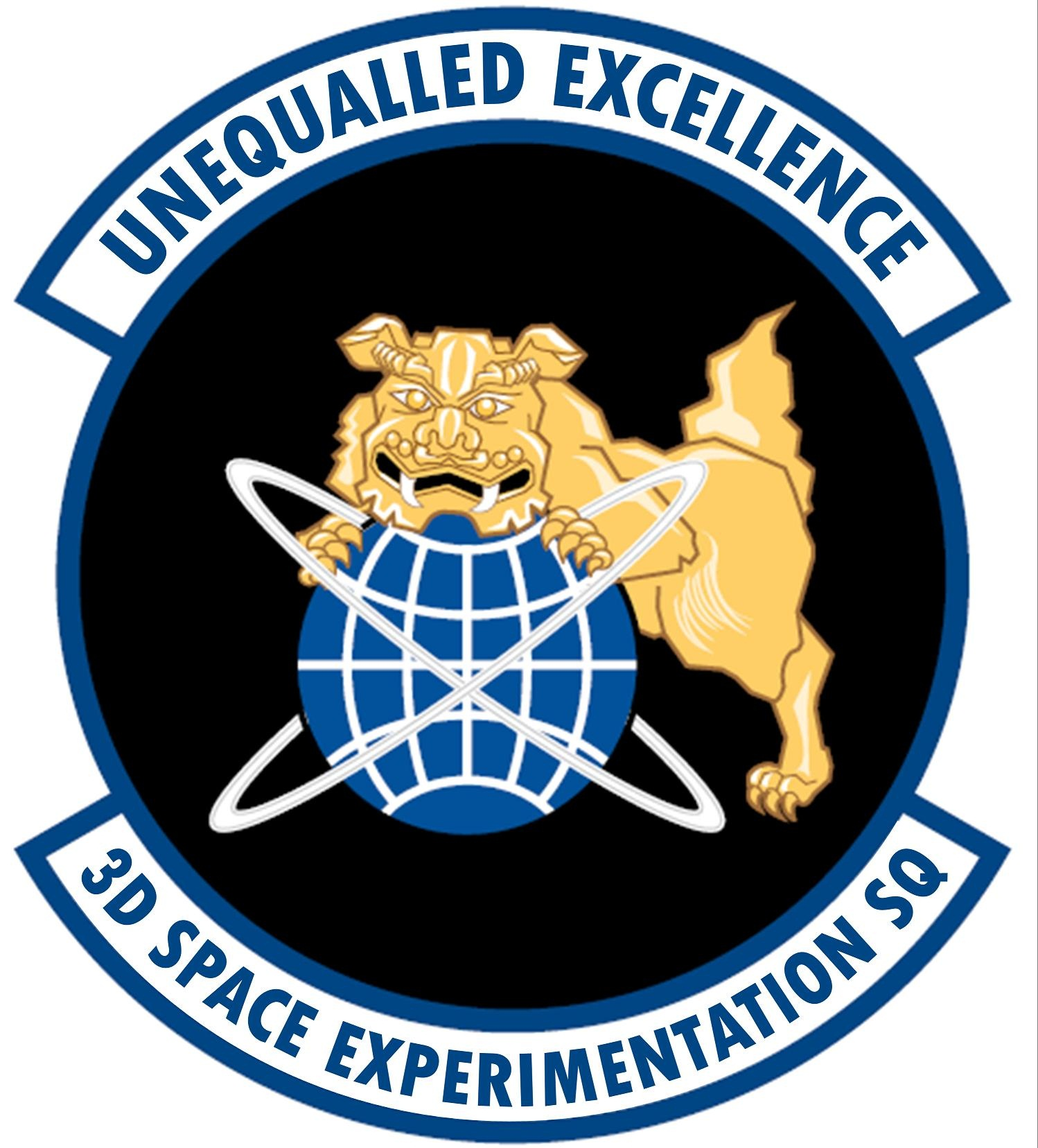
- 3d Space Experimentation Squadron Patch

The 3rd Test and Evaluation Squadron (3 TES) (formerly 3rd Space Experimentation Squadron (3 SES)) is a space test and evaluation unit of the United States Space Force located at Schriever Space Force Base in Colorado.

As part of the United States Air Force, the squadron was described, in 2008, as "AFSPC's premier organization for space-based demonstrations, pathfinders and experiments. The unit identifies concepts of employment, training, education and technical skill sets required to field selected future AFSPC missions. The 3d SES will develop a core cadre of space professionals to serve as subject matter experts for all future AFSPC space-based endeavors, demonstrate operational utility of selected demonstrations and apply lessons learned from demonstrations and pathfinders for use in future initiatives."

== History ==
The 3d SES was first constituted as the 3d Surveillance Squadron on August 10, 1990, at Misawa AB, Japan. However it was not activated at that time. In preparation for its activation and operations, Det. 3, 73d Space Group activated in January 1991 to oversee construction and site preparation for the 3d. The home for the 3d SS (project name RINGO) was completed on March 16, 1991. Two antennas, an operations building, support building, pump housing and entry control point were constructed beginning on October 1, 1991, and was completed on May 31, 1992. Later that year, the unit was redesignated 3d Space Surveillance Squadron and it activated on October 1. The unit's Deep Space Tracking System obtained initial operating capability in April 1994. The squadron inactivated on February 20, 2002.

Assigned to the 73d Space Group, the 3d was tasked with operating passive sensors for the Deep Space Tracking System. The squadron was one of two Deep Space Tracking System squadrons located throughout the world. The DSTS tracked objects orbiting more than 22,300 miles above the Earth. More than 9,500 man-made objects orbit the Earth, ranging in size from a baseball to the Mir space station. The 3d SPSS forwarded this data to the 1st Command and Control Squadron and the Space Control Center, Cheyenne Mountain Air Station, CO. The 1st CACS and the center use this information, along with other data, to catalog and identify all man-made Earth-orbiting objects. Several agencies use this information for everything from collision avoidance to intelligence.

On February 23, 2006, Air Force Space Command ordered the unit redesignated 3d Space Experimentation Squadron and activated it effective March 10, 2006, with its new home at Schriever AFB, Colorado.

On August 23, 2021, the United States Space Force, Space Training and Readiness Command (STARCOM), ordered the unit redesignated 3d Test and Evaluation Squadron and activated it effective August 27, 2021.

=== Lineage ===
- Constituted as 3d Surveillance Squadron on 10 Aug 1990

Re-designated: 3d Space Surveillance Squadron on 1 October 1992
Activated on 1 October 1992
Inactivated on 20 February 2002
Re-designated: 3d Space Experimentation Squadron on 16 February 2006
Activated on 10 March 2006
Re-designated: 3d Test and Evaluation Squadron on 27 Aug 2021

=== Assignments ===
- 73d Space Group, 1 October 1992 – 25 April 1995
- 21st Operations Group 26 April 1995 – 20 February 2002
- 595th Space Group, 10 March 2006 – 30 March 2013
- 50th Operations Group, 1 April 2013 – 18 June 2020
- 750th Operations Group, 19 June 2020 – 23 July 2020
- STAR Delta-P, 24 July 2020 – 26 August 2021
- Space Delta 12, 27 August 2021 – Present

=== Detachments ===
- Detachment 1, 3d Space Surveillance Squadron - Osan AB, Republic of Korea

=== Stations ===
- Misawa AB, Japan (1 Oct 1992–20 Feb 2002)
- Schriever Space Force Base, Colorado (10 Mar 2006 – present)

=== Space Systems ===
- Deep Space Tracking System (1992–2002)

=== Decorations ===
- Air Force Outstanding Unit Award
  - 1 Jan 2000-31 Aug 2001
  - 1 Jan 1999-31 Dec 1999
  - 1 Jan 1998-31 Dec 1998
  - 1 Oct 1997-30 Sep 1999
  - 1 Oct 1995-30 Sep 1997

== List of commanders ==
- Lt Col Robert Preston (Misawa - 1st Commander)
- Lt Col Richard Lucas (Misawa)
- Lt Col Jim Maestas
- Lt Col Jeff Hokett, 1 June 2007
- Lt Col Joseph Prue, 26 May 2009
- Lt Col Sam Johnson, 13 June 2011
- Lt Col Matthew S. Cantore, 14 June 2013
- Lt Col Zachary S. Owen, 13 February 2015
- Lt Col Kevin Amsden, 6 April 2017
- Lt Col William Burich, 31 May 2019
- Lt Col Anna Gunn-Golkin, 14 June 2021
- Lt Col David Heinz, 22 June 2023
- Lt Col Weston Hanoka, 23 June 2025
