= RAF Feltwell =

Royal Air Force station in Norfolk, England

RAF Feltwell
- Near Feltwell, Norfolk in England
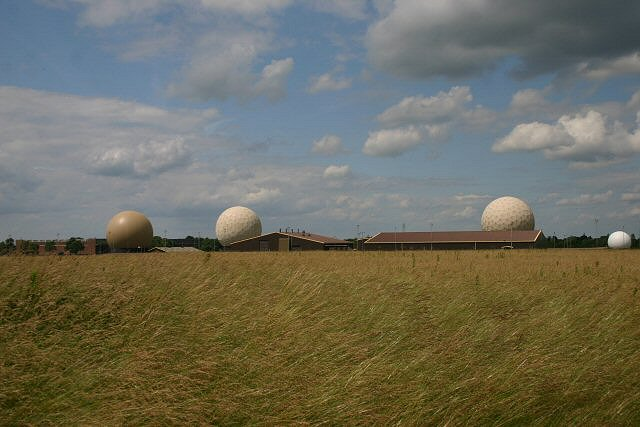
- Radomes at RAF Feltwell

Site information
- Type: RAF station (US Visiting Forces)
- Owner: Ministry of Defence
- Operator: United States Air Force
- Controlled by: US Air Forces in Europe – Air Forces Africa
- Condition: Operational

Location
- Shown within Norfolk
- Coordinates: 52°28′46″N 000°31′09″E
- Area: 137 hectares (340 acres)

Site history
- Built: 1936
- In use: 1937–1966 (Royal Air Force); 1960s – present (US Air Force)

Garrison information
- Occupants: 73rd Intelligence, Surveillance, and Reconnaissance Squadron (Detachment)

Airfield information
- Elevation: 16 metres (52 ft) AMSL

Royal Air Force Feltwell or more simply RAF Feltwell is a Royal Air Force station in Norfolk, East Anglia that is used by the United States Air Forces in Europe – Air Forces Africa. The station is located about 10 miles west of Thetford, and is in the borough of King's Lynn and West Norfolk at approximate Ordnance Survey grid reference TL 715 900. The site served as a Second World War bomber station, but is now used as a support site for regional AAFES logistics and as a housing estate for United States Air Force personnel stationed nearby at RAF Lakenheath. It is under the administrative control of the 48th Fighter Wing.

== History ==
=== Royal Air Force use ===
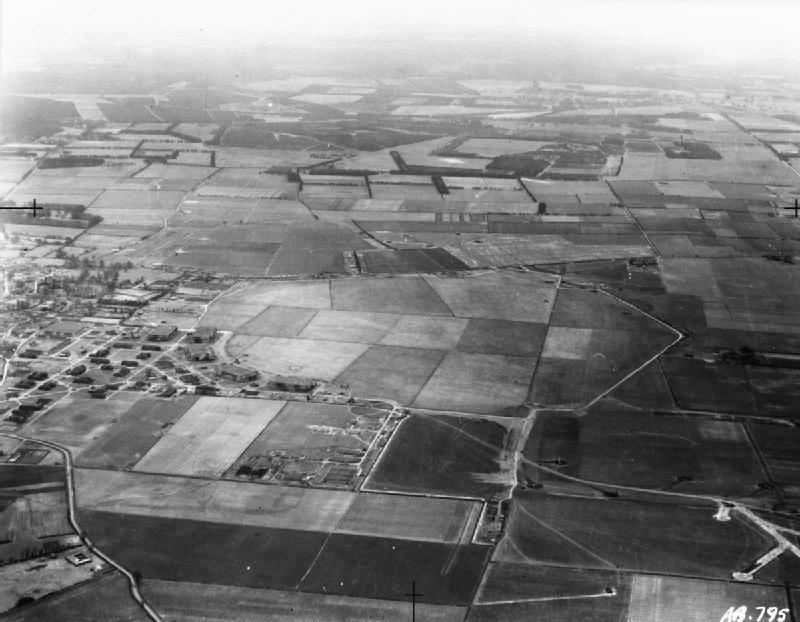
Aerial photograph from the west, World War II

The airfield was built during the period of expansion of the RAF in the late 1930s and is similar in layout to many of the other RAF airfields of the period (for example RAF Marham, RAF Watton and RAF West Raynham). The airfield was home to a number of heavy bomber squadrons of the RAF during the Second World War. Post war RAF Thor Missiles were stationed here 1958–1963. After the departure of the Thor missiles in 1963, the RAF's Officer Cadet Training Unit was based on the station, transferring from RAF Jurby, Isle of Man, in September 1963.

=== United States Air Force use ===
From 1989 it also hosted the US Air Force's 5th Space Surveillance Squadron (5 SPSS) which was subordinate to the 21st Operations Group (21 OG) and the 21st Space Wing (21 SW), both at Peterson AFB, Colorado. These organisations in turn are subordinate to the 14th Air Force (14 AF) at Vandenberg AFB, California which reports to HQ Air Force Space Command (AFSPC), also at Peterson AFB, CO.

The 5 SPSS was part of the USAF's Passive Space Surveillance Network which tracked the physical location of emitting satellites in orbit. This data along with that from other systems was used to adjust the orbits of various satellites and crewed vessels (for instance the Space Shuttle and the International Space Station) to reduce the risk of on-orbit collisions. It was inactivated in 2003 and the activity transferred to Misawa Air Base in Japan.

The base is used as a housing estate for United States Air Force personnel stationed nearby at RAF Mildenhall and RAF Lakenheath with new housing built in 2011. At one time it had been used for USAF unaccompanied airmen in barracks located on base. Currently it hosts the Mathies Airman Leadership School for USAF personnel in the UK and airmen stationed at Stavanger Airbase It also is the home of the Army and Air Force Exchange Service's sole furniture store in the country. The base also hosts the only Middle School for Lakenheath and Mildenhall as well as offices for the Department of Defense Education Activity.

Prior to the 48th Fighter Wing taking responsibility for RAF Feltwell it was administered by Detachment 4 of the 18th Intelligence Squadron, which was a space control intelligence organization of the United States Air Force, located at Wright-Patterson AFB, Ohio and other worldwide geographically separated detachments. However, the 18th IS was inactivated during September 2020 and then reactivated as the US Space Force's 73rd Intelligence, Surveillance and Reconnaissance Squadron, which is assigned to Space Delta 7 and is still hosted on RAF Feltwell.

In 2024, between 20 November and 22 November, small unmanned aerial systems (UASs) were spotted in the vicinity of and over RAF Feltwell part of wider drone incursions at US air bases in the United Kingdom. The number of UASs fluctuated and they ranged in size and configuration. F-15E Strike Eagles, based at Lakenheath, were allegedly scrambled in response to the drones as they impacted local flight operations. RAF Regiment personnel were later deployed to the bases with the ORCUS C-UAS system in response to a second sighting of unidentified drones in the night hours of 25 November.

== Former units ==
Former units include:

- No. 37 Squadron RAF (1937–1940) – Handley Page Harrow, Vickers Wellington I
- No. 57 Squadron RAF (1940–1942) – Vickers Wellington I
- No. 75 (New Zealand) Squadron RAF (1940–1942) – Vickers Wellington I
- No. 77 Squadron RAF (1958–1963) – Thor IRBM and the USAF 672d Technical Training Squadron and 99th Munitions Maintenance Squadron
- No. 192 Squadron RAF (1943) – Handley Page Halifax II & V
- No. 214 (Federated Malay States) Squadron RAF (1937–1939) – Handley Page Harrow, Vickers Wellington I
- No. 464 Squadron RAAF (1942) – Lockheed Ventura I & II
- No. 487 Squadron RNZAF (1942–1943) – Lockheed Ventura I & II
- No. 651 Squadron RAF (1955–1957) – Auster AOP6
- No. 3 Lancaster Finishing School (1943–1945) – Avro Lancaster
- No. 3 Flying Training School RAF
- No. 3 Service Flying Training School RAF
- No. 7 Temporary Depot Station
- No. 20 Heavy Glider Maintenance Section
- No. 76 (Bomber) Wing RAF
- No. 1519 (Beam Approach Training) Flight RAF
- No. 2724 Squadron RAF Regiment
- No. 2736 Squadron RAF Regiment
- No. 2807 Squadron RAF Regiment
- No. 4194 Anti-Aircraft Flight RAF Regiment
- Bomber Command Radar School
- Bomber Command Strategic Missile School
- Bombing Development Unit
- Central Bomber Establishment
- Gee-H Training Flight
- Midland Area Flying Instructors School
- New Zealand Flight
- Northern Area Flying Instructors School
- Radio Training Squadron
- RAF Officer Cadet Training Unit
- School of Instructional Technique

== See also ==
- List of Royal Air Force stations
- United States Air Forces in Europe
- United States Air Force in the United Kingdom
