= ITT 465L Strategic Air Command Control System =

American control plan

At the Offutt AFB nuclear bunker and at March AFB; SACCS had 3 AN/FSQ-31 systems each with a Data Processing Central (DPC), Data Display System (DDS), and Data Transmission Subsystem (DTS) (Barksdale AFB didn't have a DPC.) The DCS consisted of an Encryption/Decryption Subsystem, High Speed Data Transmission Equipment (Modems), and an Electronic Data Transmission Control Center (EDTCC) with secure voice units and Technical Control Consoles (TCCs)--SACCS "voice transmission [was] by patching 4-wire telephone terminating equipment on the circuit at each end. NORAD's 1963 Chidlaw Building Combined Operations Center, then Cheyenne Mountain Complex in 1966 (top left), received SAC data (e.g., to allow relay of messages through northern NORAD radar stations for recalling SAC bombers.) In 1965, RCCs were at 13 "operational base command posts" (duplexed from different EDTCCs except for 4 RCCs with "short order sites"), and SRCCs were at 2 "missile site alternate command posts"—RCCs/SRCCs had a "Fault and Facility Control Panel.". One Offutt EDTCC communicated with 1 SRCC and 6 RCCs (with 2 circuits to the 1 local RCC), while the other Offutt EDTCC only had circuits to 4 RCCs (2 bomber, 2 ICBM). At the Numbered Air Force bases, circuits from one EDTCC were to 7 RCCs, and the other connected to 5 RCCs and 1 missile SRCC.

SIMFAC

System Development Corporation (SDC) also built a Simulation Facility (SIMFAC) in Paramus, New Jersey to model the SAC Command Post using "Command/Control personnel stations, capabilities to produce simulated SACCS hardware printouts…wall displays [and] a soundproof observation deck [booth] in which SIMFAC personnel perform actions necessary to simulate all external occurrences starting from an Intelligence buildup to changes in threat responses"--the 50 ft × 35 ft (15 m × 11 m) "isolation booth" was completed in 1962 by International Electric Corporation.

The ITT 465L Strategic Air Command Control System (SACCS, SAC Control System, 465L Project, 465L Program) was a Cold War "Big L" network of computer and communication systems for command and control of Strategic Air Command "combat aircraft, refueling tankers, [and] ballistic missiles". International Telephone and Telegraph was the prime contractor for Project 465, and SACCS had "Cross Tell Links" between command posts at Offutt AFB, March AFB, & Barksdale AFB (SACCS also communicated with the Cheyenne Mountain Complex and Air Force command posts. The 465L System included IBM AN/FSQ-31 SAC Data Processing Systems, Remote (RCC) and Simplex Remote Communication Systems (SRCC), SAC Network Control Office, "4-wire, Schedule 4, Type 4B alternate voice-data operation", and one-way communication with "ICBM launch control centers" (the SAC Digital Network upgraded to two-way communications.) In addition to IBM for the "Super SAGE type computers", another of the 6 direct subcontractors was AT&T ("end-to-end control" of the communications circuits),

== Background ==
Strategic Air Command began using the telephonic Army Command and Administrative Net (ACAN) in 1946 until switching to the 1949 USAF AIRCOMNET "command teletype network" (the independent Strategic Operational Control System or SOCS with telephones and teletype was "fully installed by 1 May 1950".) SACE deployed a worldwide communications network in 1958 with a day-to-day telephone system, a teletype system, an SSB HF system, and the Primary Alert System--"a direct line telephone system between the SAC underground command post and all its subordinate command and control centers (numbered air force and wing command posts)."

1st IBM "Big L" system
In 1955 the Experimental SAGE Subsector was completed with a simplex IBM XD-1 prototype of the AN/FSQ-7 planned for the SAGE computer network, and IBM Federal Systems subsequently built dozens of vacuum tube computers for the AN/FSQ-8 and AN/FSQ-7 centrals of Support System 416L (SS-416L), the 1st "Big L" system. SAGE radar stations used AN/FST-2 sets for transferring data, and GATR sites and BOMARC Ground-to-Air Transmitter Facilities provided radio control for ground-controlled interception. An IBM AN/FSQ-32 transistorized SAGE central was announced in June 1958 and was to planned for in several NORAD nuclear bunkers, but the Super Combat Centers were cancelled in 196x. The transistorized central "was given to SDC to be used for the ARPA command-control R&D program", and the USAF "later took back [the Q-32] from SDC to SAC HQ at Omaha" for the "ADEPT…status reporting system".

In 1956, CINCSAC determined SAC's leased teleprinter (teletype) circuits and radio links were too slow, and SAC began using a computer in 1957. A SAC Liaison Team was located at the NORAD command post beginning 1 February 1958, and the 2 commands agreed direct land lines should connect SAC bases and Air Defense Direction Centers. After CONAD designated 3 "SAC Base Complexes" (geographical areas) by 1956--Northwestern United States, Montana-through-North Dakota area, and the largest: a nearly-triangular "South Central Area" from Minnesota to New Mexico to Northern Florida—NORAD's Alert Network Number 1 became operational on July 1, 1958, with the 1957 SAC nuclear bunker as 1 of the network's 29 transmit/receive stations.

== Development ==
On February 11, 1958, Headquarters USAF published General Operational Requirement or GOR 168 for SACCS (the Westover AFB command post was to get a computer system) and on April 1, HQ USAF changed the SACCS designator from Program 133L to 465L. SAC's QOR for the National Survivable Communications System (NSCS) was issued September 13, 1958, and in October 1959 the systems cost had increased from $139.7 million to $339.8 million in 12 months: the Office of the Secretary of Defense—with "doubts regarding the validity of the entire 465L concept"—cut the program by December 1. In September 1960 the "installation of a SAC display warning system" included 3 consoles (e.g., BMEWS Display Information Processor (DIP) in the Offutt bunker and on 7 December I960, the 465L Program was cut to ""a most austere approach" (an austere air defense sector was also established for NORAD, which soon planned a smaller BUIC control system.) "In July 1961, the Department of Defense redirected SACCS 465L to a pre-strike system and established a separate [airborne] post-attack command control system with air and ground elements.

by 1962, "SAC installations, inclusive of those overseas and of tenant bases, peaked at 85". "Project 465L, the SAC Control System (SACCS) [with] over a million lines, reached four times the size of the SAGE code and consumed 1,400 man-years of programming; SDC invented a major computer language, JOVIAL, specifically for this project."

SACCS "was delivered to Strategic Air Command by the contractor in March 1965" and was designed to survive nuclear attack and to provide rapid transmission, processing, and display of information to support command and control of SAC's geographically separated forces. On January 1, 1968, the SACCS attained operational capability (maintenance at Offutt and March were by the respective 55th Strategic and 33rd Communications Squadrons.) During construction of NORAD's nuclear bunker, SAC's 1963 plan for construction of a Deep Underground Support Center in Colorado beginning in 1965 was cancelled.

In 1968, "after SAC completed its tests during March, AFSC arranged for modification of the SAC terminals for use with LES-6" for satellite communications. A SACCS remote communications van completed on 12 July 1968 was shipped to Andersen AFB, Guam, e.g., for supporting the SACADVON (30 SAC B-52s had deployed on 17 February 1965 to Guam for the Vietnam War.)

== Gradual replacement ==
On October 6, 1975, SACCS officially integrated with the Worldwide Military Command and Control System when the original IBM 4020 Military Computers were replaced by Honeywell 6080 computers (remaining FSQ-31 components were entirely decommissioned in November.) Offutt became part of the WWMCCS Intercomputer Network as one of "six initial WIN sites in 1977" (20 sites by 1981). A 1977 plan was for SACCS to be replaced by the ITT SAC Automated Total Information Network (SATIN IV), "a totally new command and control system " (ITT had won the initial SATIN IV contract over Sylvania.)

=== Replaced DTS ===
Instead of SATIN IV, a restructured plan deployed the Strategic Air Command Digital Information Network to replace SACCS "Data Transmission Subsystem and part of the Data Display Subsystem", e.g., on November 5, 1986, "Martin Marietta Corporation technicians began installing SAC Digital Network (SACDIN) equipment in 91st Strategic Missile Wing missile launch control centers (i.e., either a HUTE rack or MBCP rack). On February 20, 1987, "SAC declared initial operational capability for the SAC Digital Network when [it] operated successfully between the Headquarters SAC Command Center and the 55th Strategic Reconnaissance Wing Command Post, both located at Offutt AFB, Nebraska, and the 351st Strategic Missile Wing Command Post at Whiteman AFB, Missouri." SACDIN eventually "linked 135 locations and permitted two-way message communications with ICBM launch control centers for the first time," and the Ground Wave Emergency Network communication system had a Final Environmental Impact Statement issued in September 1987.

On May 6, 1988, "software became operational on three Post Attack Command and Control aircraft making the common Airborne Launch Control Center fully capable of launching Peacekeeper and Minuteman missiles."

=== SAC Automated Command and Control System ===
External media

Images
- 465L communication diagram (Fig. 1)
- prototype EDTCC at ITT test site

Video
- SAC Command Post (at minute 5:25)

In 1990 when the 465L System had been entirely replaced by the "SAC Auto Cmd/Ctl Sys" for several years, the SAC C^{2} system continued using that name as part (except for the SACCS Data Processing System) of "USSTRATCOM Command and Control" (PE 0101316F). By 1995, the "emergency war order (EWO) communication systems consist[ed] of the primary alert system (PAS), SAC digital network (SACDIN), Survivable Low Frequency Communications System (SLFCS), Air Force Satellite Communications System (AFSATCOM), ICBM Super High Frequency Satellite Terminal (ISST) and UHF voice radio communication systems" The USSTRATCOM SACCS was redesignated Strategic Automated Command and Control System with the same acronym on tbd\ and by 2011, the Minimum Essential Emergency Communications Network was being modernized in the Nuclear Command and Control System. By February 2012, USSTRATCOM was using the Integrated Strategic Planning and Analysis Network (ISPAN), and the USSTRATCOM Replacement Facility Fit-Out (PE 0303255F) was to "include secure HEMP-Shielded Command and Control Center, mainframe computer data centers, multiple 24/7 mission operations centers, storage and maintenance areas, labs/workrooms, back-up generators, Uninterruptible Power Source, Technical Control Facility, Fiber Ring, [with funding] beginning in FY13."
