= National Military Command System =

US Cold War system

The National Military Command System (NMCS) was the federal government of the United States' Cold War command and control system that consisted of the National Military Command Center (NMCC) at The Pentagon, the Alternate National Military Command Center (NMCC) at Pennsylvania Raven Rock Mountain, 3 National Emergency Airborne Command Post (NEACP) aircraft on 24-hour ground alert, 2 National Emergency Command Post Afloat (NECPA) ships, "and interconnecting communications".

== Background ==
The United States' Cold War command and control (C^{2}) history included numerous developments such as the:

- 195x Air Force Command Post (AFCP) established at the Pentagon when the Korean War broke out
- 1955 & 1957 Strategic Air Command nuclear bunkers
- 1956 War Room Annex completed in July at the 1953 Raven Rock nuclear bunker in Pennsylvania
- 1958 "reorganization in National Command Authority relations with the joint commands" (e.g., CONAD) after President Dwight D. Eisenhower expressed concern about nuclear command and control.
- 1958 McGuire AFB groundbreaking in MONTH for the Burroughs SS-416L Control and Warning Support System with the Semi Automatic Ground Environment to control nuclear anti-aircraft missiles (e.g., BOMARC & GENIE)
- 1960 BMEWS Central Computer and Display Facility at Ent AFB, Colorado, operational on September 20 for centralizing Thule Site J BMEWS radar observations for NORAD and SAC to assess a USSR ICBM attack.
- 1960 Joint War Room at the Pentagon with consoles operational in November
- 1961 groundbreaking for the Cheyenne Mountain nuclear bunker

After initial planning May–July 1962, DoD Directive S-5100.30 "conceived" the Worldwide Military Command and Control System (WWCCS) with five planned groups of C^{2} systems: the NMCS was the primary group and was to serve the President, the United States Secretary of Defense, and the Joint Chiefs of Staff.

== 1962 ANMCC ==
The Alternate National Military Command Center (ANMCC) was established on 1 October 1962 at Raven Rock Mountain Complex and included a joint War Room Annex, "Headquarters USAF Advanced" center, an Army communications complex to connect the ANMCC to several communications networks such as NORAD's Alert Network Number 1. The ANMCC subsequently had equipment of the IBM 473L Command and Control System.

== 1962 NMCC ==
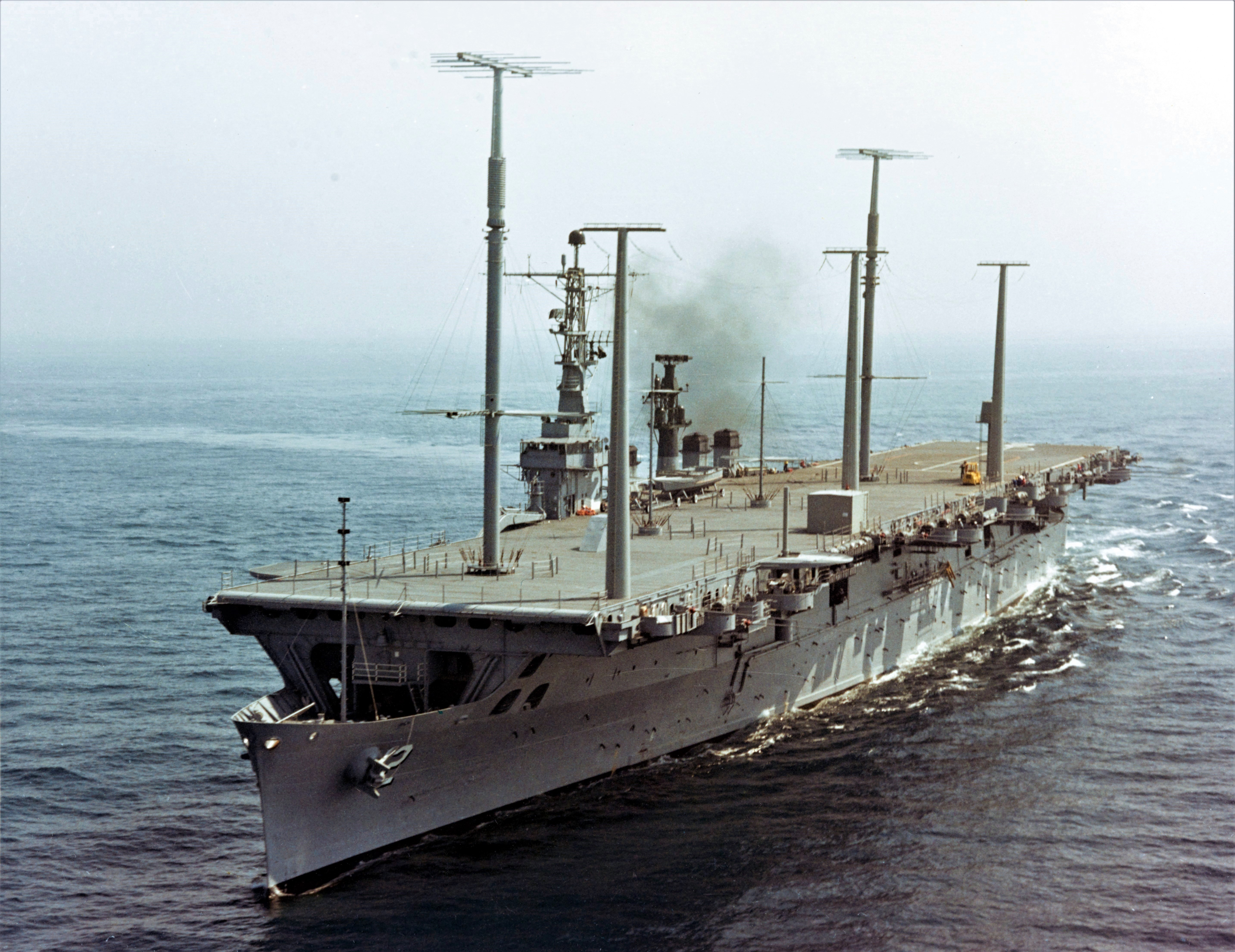
USS Wright as CC-2 off Southern California in September 1963

The National Military Command Center opened at the Pentagon in early October 1962 to replace the Air Force Command Post as the Joint Chiefs' command post. The ANMCC included 473L C^{2} equipment, including several IBM computers. It was started in early 1962 when the JCS area with the Joint War Room was expanded from ~7,000 sq ft (650 m^{2}) to ~21,000 sq ft (2,000 m^{2}) by 1965 (the Pentagon's "Navy Flag Plot" coordinated the Cuban Missile Crisis blockade.) The NMCC was initially considered an "interim" location until the Deep Underground Command Center (DUCC) could be completed below the Pentagon (never built). The NMCC had "direct communications with MACV headquarters in Saigon" during the Vietnam War.

1972 upgrade
The WWMCCS "ADP upgrade program" included 1972 computer installations (e.g., 2 COC "Data Net 355 computers") and c. mid-1972, additional NMCC expansion enlarged it to ~30,000 sq ft (2,800 m^{2}) and included the Joint Operational Reporting (JOPREP) system. In 1977, the NMCC was 1 of 6 initial sites of the WWMCCS Intercomputer Network (WIN) developed from a 1971-7 experimental program with testing and use by the JCS. The Command Center Processing and Display System (CCPDS) replaced NMCC UNIVAC 1106 computers c. 1977 with "dedicated UNIVAC 1100/42 computers" for console and large screen displays. By 1981 as part of the WWMCCS Information System (WIS), the NMCC received data "directly from the Satellite Early Warning System (SEWS) and directly from the PAVE PAWS sensor systems".

The NMCC at 38°52′16″N 77°03′20″W (tbd side of the Pentagon) coordinated responses to the 2001 September 11 attacks (AA Flt 77 struck the west side) and other events. By 2008, the NMCC had the NMCC Alert Center for intelligence fusion in the National Operations and Intelligence Watch Officer Network.
