= IBM 473L Command and Control System =

The IBM 473L Command and Control System (473L System, 473L colloq.) was a USAF Cold War "Big L" Support System with computer equipment at The Pentagon and, in Pennsylvania, the Alternate National Military Command Center nuclear bunker. Each 473L site included a Data Processing Subsystem (DPSS), Integrated Console Subsystem (ICSS), Large Panel Display Subsystem, and Data Communications Subsystem (Automatic Digital Network interface: "AUTODIN Data Terminal Bay"). The "System 473L" was an "on-line, real-time information processing system designed to facilitate effective management of USAF resources, particularly during emergency situations" e.g., for: "situation monitoring, resource monitoring, plan evaluation, plan generation and modification, and operations monitoring". In 1967, the 473L System was used during the "HIGH HEELS 67" exercise "to test the whole spectrum of command in a strategic crisis".

== Background ==
In early 1952, the Pentagon's USAF Command Post (AFCP) "arranged" to receive Air Defense Command (ADC) exercise data such as for planned mock attacks into defense sectors by faker aircraft (e.g., in 1955 on Amarillo, Denver, Salt Lake City, Kansas City, San Antonio and Phoenix.) An Experimental SAGE Subsector" for testing a Semi Automatic Ground Environment (SAGE) was created using a July 1955 prototype air defense computer ADC's 1955 command post blockhouse was completed at Ent AFB, and "in September 1955, the Air Force…replace[d its] command post's outmoded telephone system with a modern switchboard with 100 long-distance lines and room for more, so that 20 people in various parts of the country could hold as many as four conferences at a time". The Alternate Joint Communication Center in the Raven Rock nuclear bunker was equipped by the end of 1955, and ADC broke ground in 1957 for deploying the Burroughs 416L SAGE Air Defense System (the BMEWS 474L General Operational Requirement was specified in 1958.) After President Dwight D. Eisenhower expressed concern about nuclear command and control, a "1958 reorganization in NCA relations with the joint commands" was implemented, and the "AWCS 512L" system was deployed by June 1958. The GOR for a computerized 465L SAC Automated Command and Control System was issued in 1958 for Strategic Air Command's nuclear bunkers (1957 Offutt AFB bunker & 1958 at The Notch). A Joint War Room was activated at the Pentagon in 1960 and in December 1960, the AFCP reverted to a USAF-only mission when its "joint and national responsibilities" ended. After a "Quick Fix" program completed in the fall of 1960 and NORAD's Alert Network Number 1 was providing data from the Ent AFB command post in Colorado Springs, the AFCP had several rear projection screens, DEFCON status boards, and a display with colored regional blocks for the Bomb Alarm System (work had started in May 1959 for transmitting BAS data to "six command centers".) In January 1962, the Deep Underground Command Center was planned as a nuclear bunker beneath the Pentagon (the Raven Rock bunker would be phased out.)

The Air Force Command Post Systems Division was activated in 1960 for handling AFCP equipment issues (cf. AFSC's Electronic Systems Division which had the SPO) and in October 1962, DoD Directive S-5100.30 "designated 473L as the “Air Force service headquarters subsystem” of the Worldwide Military Command and Control System (WWMCCS) established the same month."

== OTC phase ==
The "Operational and Training Capability" (OTC) phase by IBM Federal Systems was the first stage of development for the 473 program. Each "Computer Communication Console" by TRW Space Technology Laboratories for OTC was part of the "DC400B/DIB display and interrogation system" that had 2 "10-inch CRT displays together with a sophisticated keyboard" This "temporary 473L system" had an IBM 1401 computer and IBM 1405 Disk Storage Unit. On January 1, 1963, ESD's 473L System Program Office was expanded (473L/492L SPO) with the added 492L responsibility for developing the United States Strike Command's Joint Airborne Communications Center/Command Post (SPOs were separated on June 15, 1965).

== OUR phase ==
As an upgrade before the IOC phase, an IBM 1410 was leased in February 1964, and the IBM 1401 computer was phased out by April—revision of OTC software for the 1410 computer was by Project OUR (OTC Update and Revision).

== IOC phase ==
The Librascope AN/FYQ-11 Data Processor Set was "a configuration of the L-3055" computer that Librascope manufactured at Glendale procured for the Initial Operational Capability phase with limited FYQ-11 equipment (e.g., without OA-6041 Control-Indicator Console). and only "4 integrated consoles". FYQ-11 had been accepted by the USAF Electronic Systems Division in late March 1965 to replace the IBM 1410 (each FYQ-11 was "234 cu ft [and required] 500 sq ft" area). The FYQ-11 had been proposed on February 19, 1962, for the Complete Operational Capability (dual AN/FYQ-11 sets with only a single OA-6041.) COC programs planned for the L-3055 included the "Deployment Monitor", "ACE-Tactical", and "ACE-Transport" (Computer Based Training on the FYQ-11 was also planned.) After FYQ-11 problems, the USAF Chief of Staff in 1966 cancelled the AN/FYQ-11 and the Comptroller was directed to dispose of "the L-3055 system's equipment" (1977 lawsuit claims by the 1968 Librascope parent--The Singer Company—were denied.)

== Complete operational capability ==
A second IBM 1410 computer was installed by December 15, 1966, and the entire 473L System included:

AN/FYA-2 Integrated Data Transfer Console
The AN/FYA-2 ("473L Integrated Console" with Logic Keyboard Display (LKB) provided the fully equipped 473L operator environment—cf. AN/FYA-3 didn't have a Hard Copy Device (HC) for the Multicolored Display (MC), nor a Console Printer (CP); while the AN/FYA-4 only had an Electronic Typewriter/Display (RT) and CP. The console was run by a Monitor Program in the DPSS, and "operational capabilities [were] exercised via operational capability overlays; that is, via plastic masks fitting over the logic keyboard portion of the operator console." The original COC plan was for DPSS output for 11 MCs and 15 CPs (i.e., 4 of the simplest AN/FYA-4 consoles for printing reports).
Query Language (473L Query)
Query Language was "very similar to the COLINGO query language and was "a constrained English language…for man-machine communication in System 473L. …to retrieve data from any file in the system or to perform certain other functions." For example, the code for airfields both within Brazil and within a 2000-mile great-circle distance of Brazilia is:

Retrieve airfields with country > Brazil, GCD (Brazilia » 2000)

Large Panel Display Subsystem
IT&T was awarded the May 1965 contract for the large 473L display which was to present information in both black and white and in color. In 1971 an Iconorama was still being used by "NORAD at the Air Force System 473L".

External image
- block diagram
- AN/FYQ-11 CPU Subsystem (p. 12); Mass Memory Subsystem (p. 4)
