= Iconorama =

Cold War rear projection display used by U.S. & Canadian military

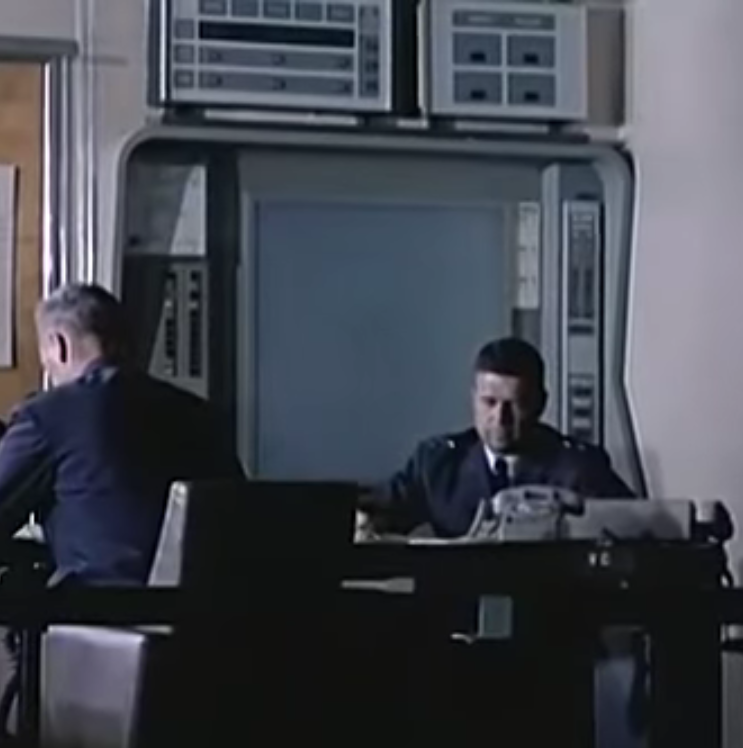
Iconorama display unit at Strategic Air Command HQ, Offut Air Force Base, in 1964.

Iconorama was a Cold War electronic projection system for graphic presentation ("stylized display using an etched plate to produce symbols") developed by the firm Fenske, Fedrick and Miller. The Iconorama was ordered by the United States Air Force in 1959.

The mechanism used a rear projection display, showing both a map overlay from a fixed lantern slide and dynamically updated data from a mechanical plotter. The mechanism for etching the slide is somewhat similar to an Etch A Sketch. The display can draw lines and characters, but cannot erase them individually.

The unit was used in the IBM 473L Command and Control System's Large Panel Display Subsystem (e.g., at the National Military Command Center and the Alternate Military Command Center). Advertised in 1961 by Temco Aircraft Corp. (already a subsidiary of Ling-Temco Electronics, Inc.), the system used "a coated slide...one inch square" that was scribed "by a moving stylus" to make traces (e.g., for paths of attacking bombers). The unit was used by the Strategic Air Command, in the Marine Technical Data System and at the Air Force Command Post, Mount Weather Emergency Operations Center, Pacific Missile Range, Point Mugu Calif.; the White Sands Missile Range in New Mexico; the Atlantic Missile Range at Cape Canaveral, Fla., and the Naval Research Laboratory. NORAD's Combined Operations Center at the Chidlaw Building and BMEWS Central Computer and Display Facility at Ent AFB used Iconorama, and in 1971 an Iconorama was still being used by NORAD for BMEWS.

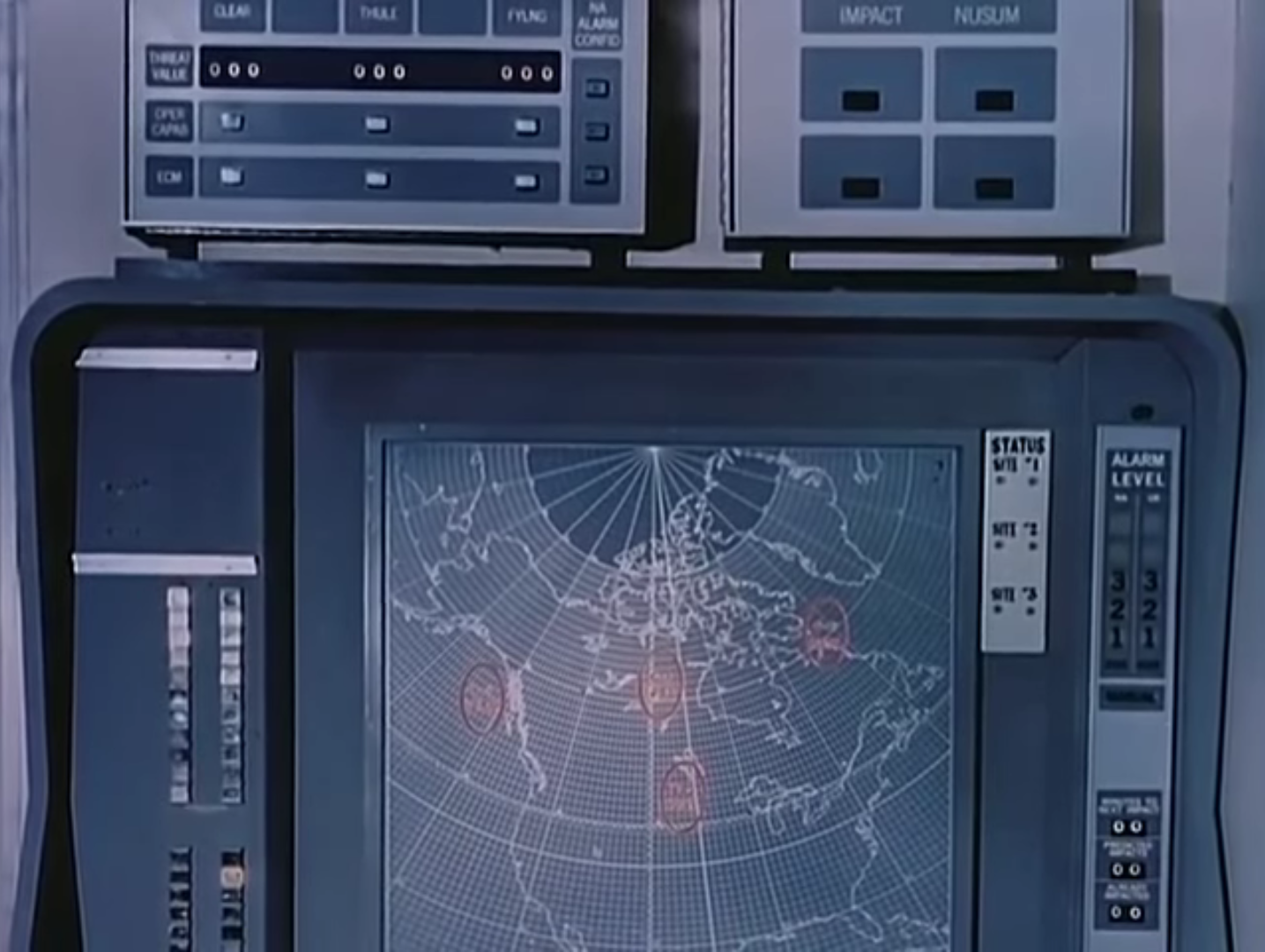
Displayed map on Iconorama
