= National Military Command Center =

Main war rooms for the President and Secretary of Defense in the Pentagon

Coordinates: 38°52′16″N 77°03′20″W

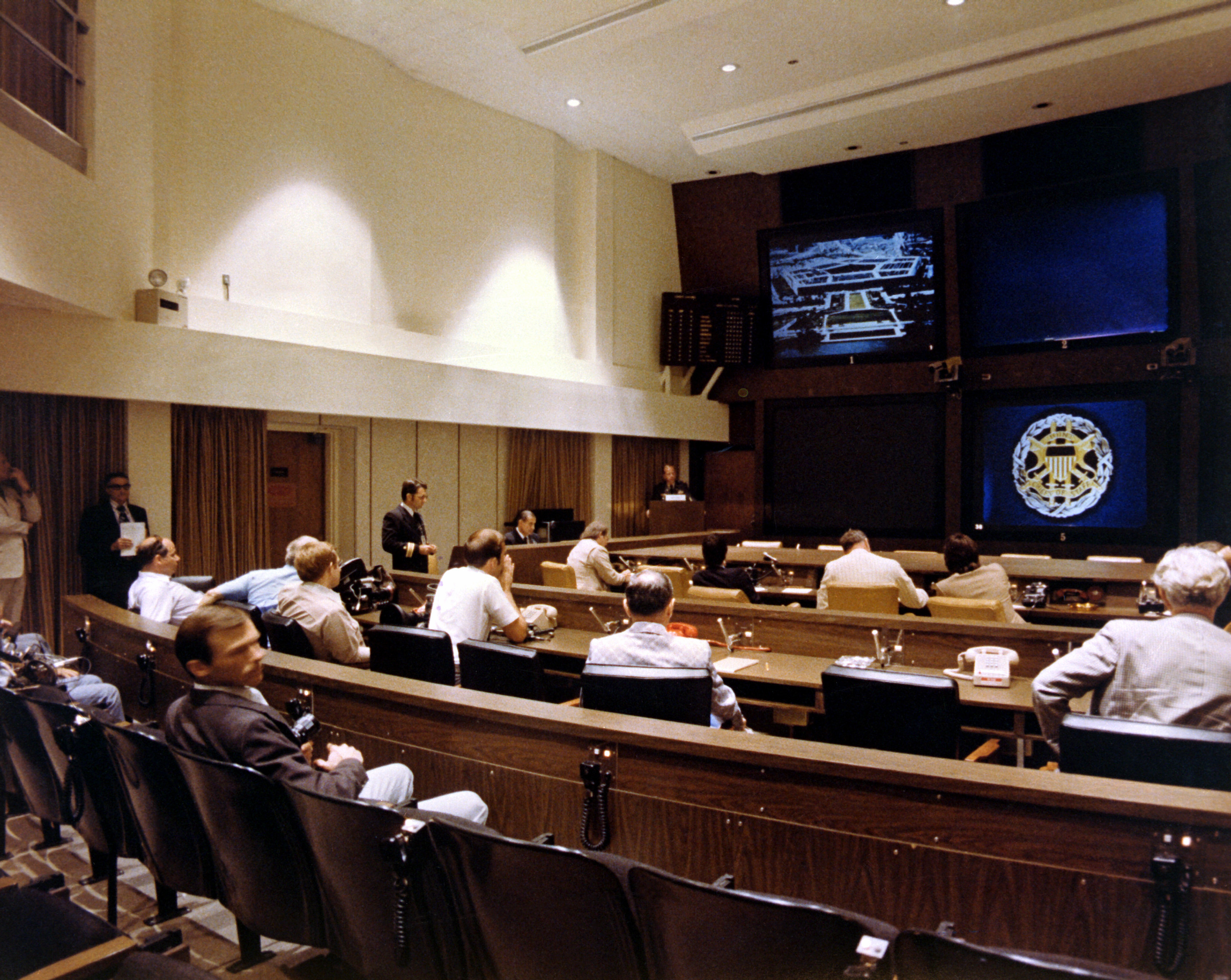
The NMCC in 1976

The National Military Command Center (NMCC) is a Pentagon command and communications center for the National Command Authority (i.e., the president of the United States and the United States secretary of defense). Maintained by the Department of the Air Force as the "DoD Executive Agent" for NMCC logistical, budgetary, facility, and systems support, the NMCC operators are in the Joint Staff's J-3 (Operations) Directorate. "The NMCC is responsible for generating Emergency Action Messages (EAMs) to missile launch control centers, nuclear submarines, recon aircraft, and battlefield commanders".

== Mission ==
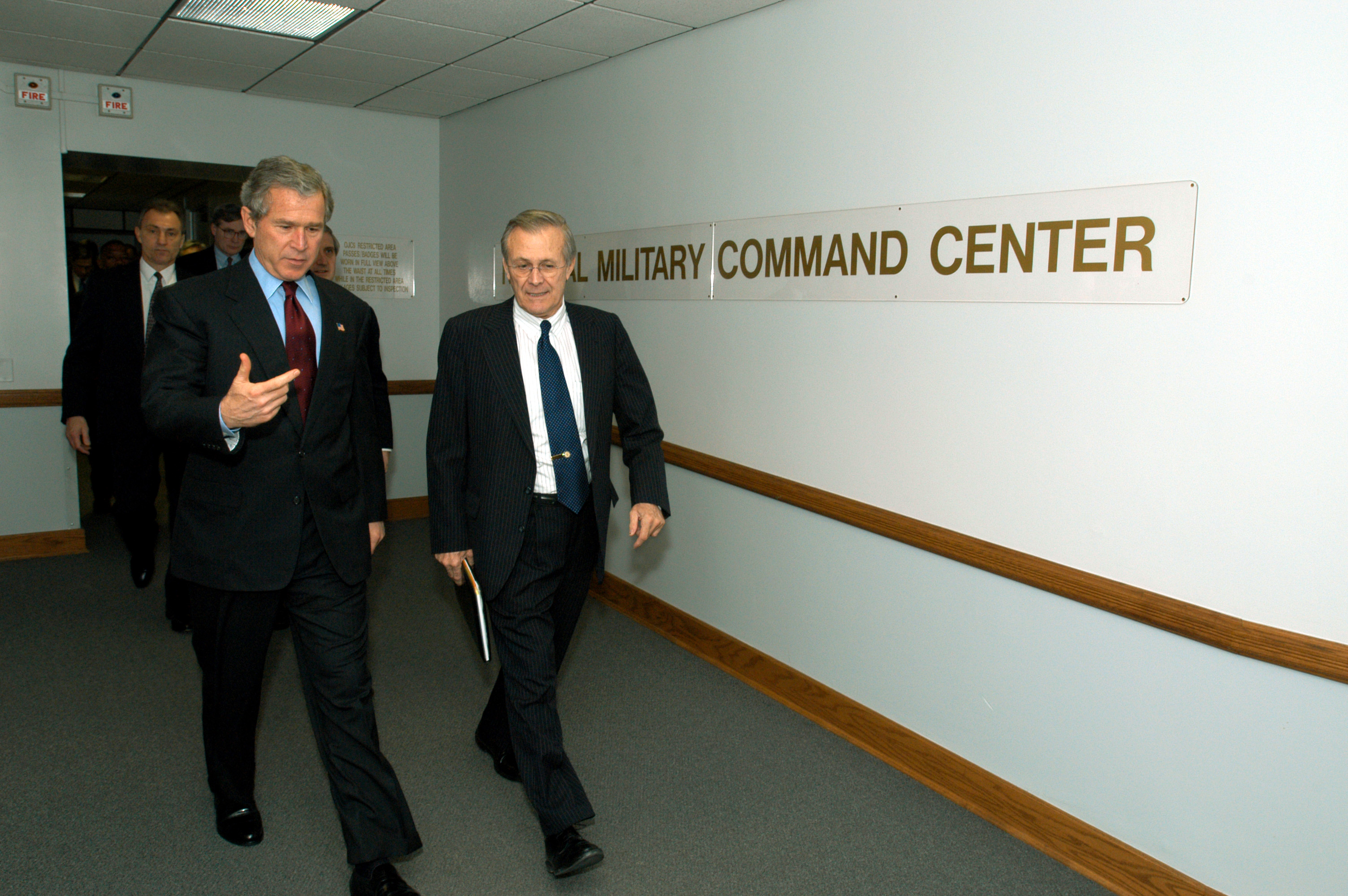
President George W. Bush and Secretary of Defense Donald H. Rumsfeld walk from the Pentagon's National Military Command Center where they received operational briefings on March 23, 2003.

The NMCC has three main missions, all serving the chairman of the Joint Chiefs of Staff in his role as the principal military advisor to both the secretary of defense and the president (also known as the National Command Authority).

- The primary task of the NMCC is to monitor worldwide events which may be of defense significance.
- The NMCC also has a crisis response component (e.g., response to the bombing of the USS Cole, the September 11 attacks, the attack on the USS Liberty,
- In addition, it includes a strategic watch component (e.g., monitoring ballistic missile launches and other nuclear activity).

When directed by the NCA, the NMCC is responsible for generating Emergency Action Messages (EAMs) to missile launch control centers, nuclear submarines, recon aircraft, and battlefield commanders worldwide. It maintains the American end of the famous U.S.–Russia hotline (the so-called "red telephone").

== Organization ==
The NMCC is operated by five teams on a rotating watch system. Each team typically has 17–20 personnel on duty performing a wide variety of functions including communications. Teams are led by a deputy director for operations (DDO) and an assistant deputy director for operations (ADDO), and are divided into five duty officer positions: The DDO is typically a brigadier general or rear admiral (lower half), and the ADDO is typically a colonel or Navy captain. In the event that the president convenes a conference with advisors to discuss options for launching a nuclear strike, the DDO would be a key participant in the meeting.

- Leadership (one DDO and one assistant deputy director for operations (ADDO))
- Current Operations Section (two senior operations officers (SOO) and one current operations officer (COO))
- Emergency Action Element (three senior emergency actions officers, EAO, EA NCO)
- Surveillance (one Officer)
- Supporting Sections (approximately 8–10 individuals)

The more than 300 people in the NMCC have responsibilities that are operational in nature. The NMCC is not funded through the Joint Staff, but by the Department of the Air Force; whereas DoD Executive Agent provides logistical, budgetary, facility and systems support to the NMCC.

The Joint Staff J-3 Command Systems Operations Division manages the operations of the information system facilities and maintains operational control of the Crisis Management Automated Data Processing System for the National Military Command Center.

=== List of deputy directors ===
Branch	Portrait	Name	Serving since	Ref
U.S. Army	Mark J. Hovatter	Brigadier General; Adam Ake (Team Four)	June 2024	
U.S. Marine Corps	Trevor Hall	Brigadier General; Trevor Hall (Team Three)	August 2025	
U.S. Navy		Rear Admiral (lower half); William R. Reed (Team Two)	3 March 2025	
U.S. Air Force	Matthew E. Jones	Brigadier General; Matthew E. Jones (Team Five)	June 2024	
U.S. Space Force	Robert W. Davis	Brigadier General; Robert W. Davis (Team One)	July 2025	

== Description ==
The NMCC includes several war rooms, uses more than 300 operational personnel, and houses the United States side of the 1963 Moscow–Washington hotline which links the Pentagon and the Kremlin. Data into the NMCC includes the warning "on the size, origin, and targeting of an attack" (e.g., from the NORAD/NORTHCOM Command Center). The NMCC's Crisis Management Automated Data Processing Systems are under the control of the J-3 Command Systems Operations Division.

== History ==
World War II Pentagon construction allowed a central military installation for the Navy and War Departments to communicate with theater commands, and CONUS air defense was based on warning data compiled by local Aircraft Warning Corps information centers for processing GOC observations and radar tracks to coordinate ground-controlled interception (cf. Battle of Los Angeles). As requested by Gen. Spaatz, a fall 1947 AAF "war room" was established in the Pentagon ("operational early in 1948"). Strategic Air Command began using the telephonic Army Command and Administrative Net (ACAN) in 1946 until switching to the 1949 USAF AIRCOMNET "command teletype network" (the independent Strategic Operational Control System (SOCS) with telephones and teletype was "fully installed by 1 May 1950".)

=== 1950 Air Force Command Post ===
The Air Force Command Post (AFCP) was "hastily set up" on June 25, 1950, to replace the 1948 war room when the Korean War began. On the Pentagon's floor, the AFCP served "as a reception point for radio messages between [General] Vandenberg and his FEAF commanders during Air Staff after-duty hours." After a direct telephone line was installed in mid-July 1950 between CONAC headquarters and the 26th Air Division HQ ("the beginning of the Air Force air raid warning system"); in August "President Truman had a direct telephone line installed between the Air Force Pentagon post and the White House."

Moved to a "more permanent" Pentagon facility in early 1951, the 2nd AFCP location had "a communications center [and] war room, which prepared status displays" (an "Emergency Air Staff Actions Office [was] incorporated into the command post early in 1952"). Alternate AFCP sites in 1951 were at Langley AFB (primary) and Maxwell AFB (secondary). Radar tracks from the 1952 Permanent System radar stations relayed to the Air Defense Command command center at Ent AFB, Colorado, would be assessed, and suspicion or confirmation of attack would be relayed to the AFCP and SAC headquarters. The "Pentagon would pass the warning to the President, the Secretary of Defense, and the JCS"; and the SOCS allowed "relay [of] their orders to the combat forces".

=== 1953 JCS Pentagon annex ===
At the Pentagon, an annex was established c. 1952–53 by the Joint Chiefs of Staff was "operated by the Air Force as an adjunct to the AFCP" and received reports from Joint Coordination Centers in Buckinghamshire, England, and Pershing Heights, Tokyo. ADC built a new Ent AFB blockhouse in 1954 and "in August 1955 OSD approved the 'automatic' activation of the [Raven Rock] AJCC on the declaration of air defense warning or notice of surprise attack.

1956 Raven Rock annex
In July 1956 in the Pennsylvania bunker, a joint "War Room Annex was established" and was operated by the Air Force. In 1955 the National Security Council designated the AFCP as the "national air defense warning center", and Raven Rock's scope "was broadened in April 1957 [for] activation prior to emergency if JCS thought it necessary."

In 1957 NORAD collocated command center operations in the 1954 ADC blockhouse (later into the 1963 Chidlaw Building and in 1966, Cheyenne Mountain Complex). On July 1, 1958, the AFCP was connected to NORAD's Alert Network Number 1, as 1 of 29 transmit/receive stations (a differing "worldwide telephone system" was complete "from national authorities to unified commanders" by December 1958.) Starting in August 1959 "with USAF assistance [the] JCS set up its own Joint War Room (JWR)" at the Pentagon. In September 1960 at the Offutt AFB nuclear bunkers the "installation of a SAC display warning system" included 3 consoles in the Offutt AFB nuclear bunkers (cf. 1958 Bare Mountain bunker.) On 20 October 1960, the JCS "instructed the Joint Staff to establish a Joint Alternate Command Element (JACE)" for rotating battle staffs to the AJCC for temporary duty.

=== 1960 Joint War Room ===
The Joint War Room (JWR) consoles became operational in November 1960 and on December 21, the AFCP reverted to a USAF mission when its "joint and national responsibilities" ended. The September 1960 Winter Study Group and the October 1960 WSEG Report 50 recommended "interlocking the various fixed command posts" into a "coupled command system" with mobile centers and a "bomb alarm system". The subsequent National Defense Communications Control Center (NDCCC) opened on March 6, 1961 as part of the National Communications System (NCS) framework "encompassing all federal assets" including approximately "79 major relay stations scattered around the globe" (cf. the NORAD CMC's 427M NCS).—the Final Report of the National Command and Control Task Force (Partridge Report) was completed on 14 November 1961. After developmental cost overruns, "OSD in mid-1961 changed both the SAGE and SAC 465L programs to pre-battle systems [and instead] approved a Post-Attack Command Control System (PACCS) for SAC and a Backup Interceptor Control (BUIC) system for ADC and NORAD". The Raven Rock JACE "was activated on 11 July 1961 under USAF Brig. Gen. Willard W. Smith [with the 5] staffs permanently stationed in Washington and an administrative section at Ft. Ritchie" (rotations began in October 1961), and development of the USAF's "separate, austere Post-Attack Command and Control System (PACCS)" began in July 1961.

=== 1961 NCC Task Force ===
"The National Command and Control Task Force, headed by General Partridge, submitted its findings on 14 November 1961" (Partridge Report), which recommended "the Joint War Room become the National Military Command Center (NMCC)"—it was "to become the nerve center of a National Military Command System" with underground and mobile alternate command centers. An 8 March 1962 JCCDG plan for a 220,000 ft^{2} (20,000 m^{2}) addition to the JWR was too expensive, and the group postponed NMCC planning until WWMCCS planning was completed (a concept was complete in late March.) On 2 June 1962 Secretary McNamara issued a memorandum directing that the NMCS be put into operation, and a committee under the director of the Office of Emergency Planning recommended on 11 June 1962 that the NMCS include civilian executive departments for emergencies. The JCS approved the NMCS plan on 19 June, and the Joint Command Control Requirements Group formed in June 1962 revised the plan which SECDEF approved in early July. September refinements in the plan were approved by SECDEF on 17 October in DOD Directive S-5100.30, which conceived the WWMMCCS with five types of C^{2} systems with the NMCS to serve the president/SECDEF/JCS as the primary type of system and containing the NMCC, the ANMCC, 3 NEACP aircraft on 24-hour ground alert, 2 NECPA ships, "and interconnecting communications".

=== 1962 NMCC ===
The NMCC was begun in early 1962 (opened early October) when the JCS area with the Joint War Room was expanded from ~7,000 sq ft (650 m^{2}) to ~21,000 sq ft (2,000 m^{2}) by 1965 (the Pentagon's "Navy Flag Plot" coordinated the Cuban Missile Crisis blockade.) The NMCC was initially considered an "interim" location until the Deep Underground Command Center (DUCC) could be completed below the Pentagon (never built). In December 1963 "SAC accepted the first 465L elements and began to send a limited flow of [data] traffic through them." The NMCC had "direct communications with MACV headquarters in Saigon" during the Vietnam War.

==== 1972 upgrade ====
The WWMCCS "ADP upgrade program" included 1972 computer installations (e.g., 2 COC "Data Net 355 computers") and c. mid-1972, additional NMCC expansion enlarged it to ~30,000 sq ft (2,800 m^{2}) and included the Joint Operational Reporting (JOPREP) system. In 1977, the NMCC was 1 of 6 initial sites of the WWMCCS Intercomputer Network (WIN) developed from a 1971–77 experimental program with testing and use by the JCS. The Command Center Processing and Display System (CCPDS) replaced NMCC UNIVAC 1106 computers c. 1977 with "dedicated UNIVAC 1100/42 computers" for console and large screen displays. By 1981 as part of the WWMCCS Information System (WIS), the NMCC received data "directly from the Satellite Early Warning System (SEWS) and directly from the PAVE PAWS sensor systems".

== In popular culture ==
- The 1964 films Dr. Strangelove and Fail Safe both depict the Pentagon war room.
- In The Sum of All Fears (2002), Jack Ryan (played by Ben Affleck) goes to the NMCC and convinces the DDO to get him on the US-Russian hotline, trying to stop an all-out nuclear confrontation between the two nuclear powers.
- The 2007 Transformers film has a scene set in an imaginative representation of the National Military Command Center.
- The Call of Duty: Black Ops campaign mission "U.S.S.D" and zombies map "Five" take place in the war room of the Pentagon, appearing almost identical to the real-life counterpart.

== See also ==
External image
- floor plans & photos

- Gold Codes
- Nuclear football
- Raven Rock Mountain Complex
- Continuity of government
- Operation Looking Glass
- National Airborne Operations Center
- White House Situation Room
- National Defense Management Center (Russian equivalent)
