= Raven Rock Mountain Complex =

US continuity of government bunker in Pennsylvania

- Liberty Township, Adams County, Pennsylvania, United States
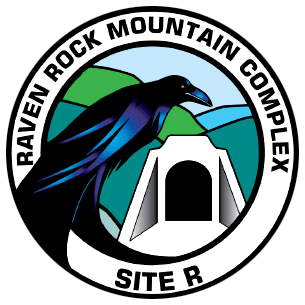
- The Site R tunnel entrance with abutments (39.7296°N 77.4325°W, white figure in illustration) now has a building that is visible from a public road intersection to the west, particularly when trees are bare. The tunnel's other (east) opening is near the military installation's above-ground support area near the Route 16 intersection with Jacks Mountain Road.

Site information
- Type: Nuclear bunker
- Owner: U.S. government

Location
- Location within Pennsylvania Location within the United States
- Coordinates: 39°44′03″N 77°25′11″W (mountain summit)

Site history
- Built: 1951–1953
- See also: 1959 High Point bunker; Mount Weather Emergency Operations Center; 1959 Greenbrier nuclear bunker; Project Greek Island

The Raven Rock Mountain Complex (RRMC), also known as Site R and simply The Rock, is a U.S. military installation with an underground nuclear bunker near Blue Ridge Summit, Pennsylvania. Raven Rock Mountain has been called an "underground Pentagon". The bunker has emergency operations centers for the United States Army, Navy, Air Force, and Marine Corps. Along with the Mount Weather Emergency Operations Center in Virginia and the Cheyenne Mountain Complex in Colorado, it formed the core bunker complexes for the US continuity of government plan during the Cold War to survive a nuclear attack.

== Description ==
The installation's largest tenant unit is the Defense Threat Reduction Agency, and RRMC communications are the responsibility of the 114th Signal Battalion. The facility has 38 communications systems, and the Defense Information Systems Agency provides computer services at the complex.

== History ==
Raven Rock Mountain is adjacent to Jacks Mountain on the north, while Miney Branch flows west-to-east between them in the Potomac River Watershed. The 1820 Waynesboro-Emmitsburg Turnpike with toll station for the 1787 crossroad was constructed between the mountains, where the Fight at Monterey Gap was conducted after the 1863 Battle of Gettysburg (Stuart's artillery at Raven Rock Gap shelled Federal troops.) In 1870, copper ore was discovered to the north, and the nearby Fountain Dale Springs House was established in 1874. The scenic area's mountain recreation facilities to the west included the 1877 Pen Mar Park, the 1878 High Rock Tower, the 1885 Monterey Country Club, and several resorts (e.g., Blue Mountain House, Buena Vista Springs Hotels, & Washington Cliff House). The 1889 Jacks Mountain Tunnel on the Western Extension (Baltimore and Harrisburg Railway) was completed near Raven Rock Mountain, and nearby stations were at Blue Ridge Summit and Charmian. The Army's 1942 Camp Ritchie was built southwest of the resorts, and a local road was built eastward from Blue Ridge Summit and intersected the north-south Fountaindale-Sabillasville Road (the intersection now provides access to the RRMC main gate).

Planning for a protected Cold War facility near Washington, D.C., began in 1948 for relocation of military National Command Authorities and the Joint Communications Service.

Army Unit

In 1953 the Army's Raven Rock unit was part of Joint Support Command, then in 1971 was redesignated as the Directorate of Telecommunications and placed under the garrison commander of Fort Ritchie, where Strategic Communications Command moved. The Directorate was redesignated USACC Site R Telecommunications Center in 1976, then simply USACC Site R in October 1981 (both under 7th Signal Command). Col. Humphrey L. Peterson was the 1983 commander of USACC Site R, which was redesignated in May 1984 as United States Army Information Systems Command - Site R. Operation of the center was removed from the mission when the unit was redesignated the 1111th U.S. Army Signal Battalion under the 1101st U.S. Army Signal Brigade in October 1988 (under the 1108th U.S. Army Signal Brigade in October 1993), and the battalion remained responsible for maintenance, upkeep and communications. The unit became the 114th Signal Battalion under the 21st Signal Brigade after the 1995 Base Realignment and Closure Commission.

=== Underground communications center ===
The planned deep underground communications center was identified in the original 1950 federal petition to seize the Beard Lot, a 1,500-foot-high (460 m), 1-mile-long (1.6 km) hill located at Fountaindale and extending east and south along the Waynesboro-Emmitsburg road, The "Declaration of Taking" for United States of America v. 1,100 Acres of Land was filed at the Adams County courthouse on 23 January 1951, and made the government the official owner of the 280-acre (110 ha)-acre tract seized from four properties (17 total properties had been requested by 15 February—some only for temporary use). South of and above the Carson service station on the Sunshine trail, bulldozers began work on 19 January 1951; by 3 February a roadway to the site had been leveled behind a farmhouse; and by 24 February underground work had commenced (40 men working "normally" on that date were only performing above-ground construction). By 26 May the Army had named the landform Raven Rock Mountain ("Raven Rock" is a pillar landform to the north along the mountain range) and listed its elevation as 1,527 feet (465 m).

By 20 October 1951, there had been two deaths: one, Roland P. Kelly, of PenMar, MD, due to premature dynamite detonation in the Beard Lot tunnel, and a power shovel operator from Emmitsburg, MD named Leroy Fleagle who suffered crushing injuries. The S. A. Healy Company was working on the alternate Pentagon in November 1951, when the government announced a defense appropriations cutback that would affect the project. On 16 January 1952, the government indicated that when completed, the bunker would have a standby group of approximately 100 personnel. Because of construction damage to the Sunshine Trail, the US said it would rebuild the trail in any fashion the state desired.

By 29 March 1952, more than 100 workers were striking from building additional Raven Rock housing at Camp Ritchie, which was to be a supplemental installation for the underground Pentagon at Fountaindale. No work was going on in the Raven Rock (Beard Lot) tunnel then. Local travelers having to bypass on the serpentine on the slope between Monterey and Fountaindale grew frustrated during the delay (the incomplete tunnel was derogatorily dubbed "Harry's Hole," for President Truman). By 7 April 1952, United Telephone Company rights of way had been secured for four tracts, including one in Cumberland Township. Easements for three additional private tracts were filed by the government in December 1953 (a 1954 lawsuit against the U.S. by Alfred Holt was seeking $2,000 per 1-acre (4,000 m^{2}) for his 140-acre (57 ha) woodlot atop the Beard Lot after turning down an offer of $2,800 from the government).

A 1952 Army history disclosed Raven Rock information. Three underground buildings were completed in 1953, the year a guard shelter burned on the installation. By April 1954, "Little Pentagon" development had cost $35,000,000.

=== Automatic activation ===
After the 1954 Air Defense Command blockhouse was built at Ent Air Force Base, where the joint 1955 Continental Air Defense Command was activated, in August 1955 OSD approved the automatic activation of Raven Rock's Alternate Joint Communication Center on declaration of air defense warning or notice of surprise attack (SAC similarly completed a bunker in 1955). The AJCC was equipped with command and control (C^{2}) hardware by the end of 1955.

=== 1956 War Room Annex ===
In July 1956, the Air Force established and operated a joint War Room Annex at Raven Rock. Raven Rock's readiness was broadened in April 1957 for activation before an emergency if the JCS thought it necessary. By 1959, the services and JCS regarded Raven Rock as their primary emergency deployment center. For the Air Force, it served as Headquarters USAF Advanced, capable of receiving the Chief of Staff and key officers. After President Dwight D. Eisenhower expressed concern about nuclear command and control, a 1958 reorganization in National Command Authority relations with the joint commands was implemented. On 1 July 1958 Raven Rock's USAF facility, ADCC (Blue Ridge Summit), became one of the 33 NORAD Alert Network Number 1 stations (but with receive-only capability as at TAC Headquarters, Sandia Base, and the Presidio at San Francisco.) On 20 October 1960, the JCS instructed the Joint Staff to establish a Joint Alternate Command Element (JACE) for rotating battle staffs to Raven Rock for temporary duty. In November 1960, consoles at the Pentagon's Joint War Room became operational, and the Raven Rock JACE was activated on 11 July 1961 under USAF Brig. Gen. Willard W. Smith with the 5 staffs permanently stationed in Washington and an administrative section at Ft. Ritchie—rotations began in October 1961 (Fort Ritchie also had the OSD Defense Emergency Relocation Site.) An expansion project by the Frazier–Davis–McDonald Company was underway in December 1961 at the "little Pentagon", and bunker personnel were evacuated during a 1962 fire. Pentagon construction to provide an entire JCS center at the Joint War Room opened the National Military Command Center (NMCC) in early October 1962. It was initially considered an interim center until a nearby Deep Underground Command Center (DUCC) could be completed after which Raven Rock would be phased out as superfluous, whichever version (50-man or 300-man DUCC) was chosen, but neither was built—nor were SAC's similar Deep Underground Support Center or NORAD's Super Combat Centers.

=== 1962 ANMCC ===
Raven Rock's joint War Room, USAF ADCC, and other facilities were designated the Alternate National Military Command Center (ANMCC) on 1 October 1962 when the Burroughs SS-416L Control and Warning Support System with the Semi Automatic Ground Environment had been deployed (Back-Up Interceptor Control began at North Bend AFS in December.) The term AJCC remained in use, only for the Army-managed communications complex. On 17 October 1962, DOD Directive S-5100.30 conceived the Worldwide Military Command and Control System with five groups of C^{2} systems: the National Military Command System was the primary group (to serve the President/SECDEF/JCS) and was to contain the Pentagon NMCC, Raven Rock's ANMCC, 3 NEACP aircraft on 24-hour ground alert, 2 NECPA ships, and interconnecting communications—the Raven Rock bunker was hardened further to about 140 psi blast resistance by 1963 when the Cheyenne Mountain nuclear bunker was being completed for tbd psi. The USAF's subsequent IBM 473L Command and Control System with AN/FYA-2 Integrated Data Transfer Consoles and Large Panel Display Subsystem had equipment deployed at both the NMCC and ANMCC (a second IBM 1410 computer was installed by 15 December 1966.)

=== 1976 Telecommunications Center ===
The USACC Site R Telecommunications Center was designated in 1976, and the 1977 Alternate National Military Command and Control Center Improvement Program was worked on by the DoD Special Projects Office (later renamed Protective Design Center) for a new deep underground C^{2} center with >3 mi (4.8 km) of air entrainment tunnels (cancelled in 1979.) After the 2001 September 11 attacks, Vice President Dick Cheney used Raven Rock as a protected site away from President George W. Bush. Notably, United States Deputy Secretary of Defense Paul Wolfowitz remained at Raven Rock during the aftermath of the 9/11 attacks as Defense Secretary Donald Rumsfeld refused to evacuate the Pentagon.

The Raven Rock Mountain Complex was declared part of the Pentagon Reservation under 10 U.S.C. § 2674(g) and on 25 May 2007, DoD policy declared it is unlawful for any person entering or on the property ..."to make any photograph, sketch, picture, drawing, map or graphical representation of the Raven Rock Mountain Complex without first obtaining the necessary permission."

In 1977, the bunker had an Emergency Conference Room, and the Current Action Center was a military intelligence unit (an Air Force general was responsible for overseeing the installation's communications).

== In popular culture ==
- In the Fallout series of video games, it is home to the Enclave, a post-apocalyptic remnant of a U.S. government deep state. It was featured in the 2008 video game Fallout 3 and referred to in both Fallout 4 (in a Boston Bugle article readable on a terminal at the Bugle's offices in Beacon Hill), and Fallout 76 as having been in contact with the AI at the Whitespring Bunker (the real world Project Greek Island) until communications between them were deliberately cut. The games' developer, Bethesda, also used the name for a location in the Elder Scrolls series of video games.
- In the TV series Jeremiah, Raven Rock is where the sinister Valhalla Sector survived the pandemic that killed almost all of the other adults on the planet before emerging with plans of conquest.
- In Prison Break, Raven Rock is an identified location.
- The complex has an important role in the 2013 sci-fi movie Oblivion, in which it is the headquarters of an underground resistance movement against an alien invasion.
- In the third book of the One Second After series, Raven Rock is referred to as "Site R" and is used by the U.S. government to house highly important citizens and government officials.
- In the TV series Salvation, Raven Rock is referred to as a site to house government officials in the case of an asteroid collision with Earth.
- In the book series Mitch Rapp, the president and his cabinet are moved to "Site R" multiple times throughout the series.
- The 2023 novel Inside Threat by Matthew Quirk takes place almost entirely inside the Raven Rock Complex.
- The 2025 film A House of Dynamite directed by Kathryn Bigelow references the Raven Rock Complex, and the main entrances are shown from above as the destination for government officials engaged in the continuity of government.
- The 2026 video game No More Room In Hell 2 features the Raven Rock Complex as a playable level, overrun by zombies. The level takes place both inside and outside the facility.
