= National Emergency Command Post Afloat =

United States plan for the shipboard continuity of operations of the government

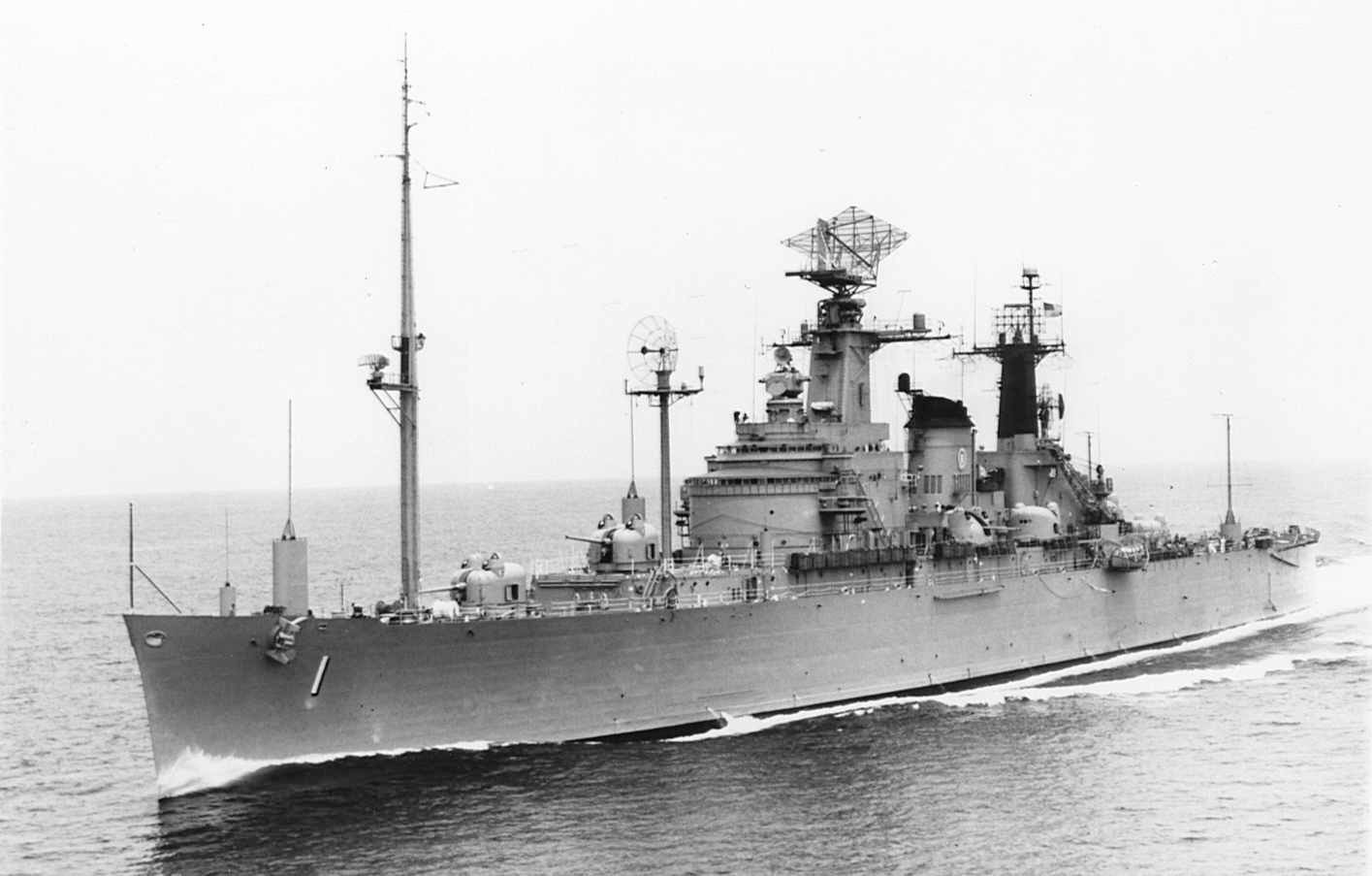
Northampton underway in 1959.

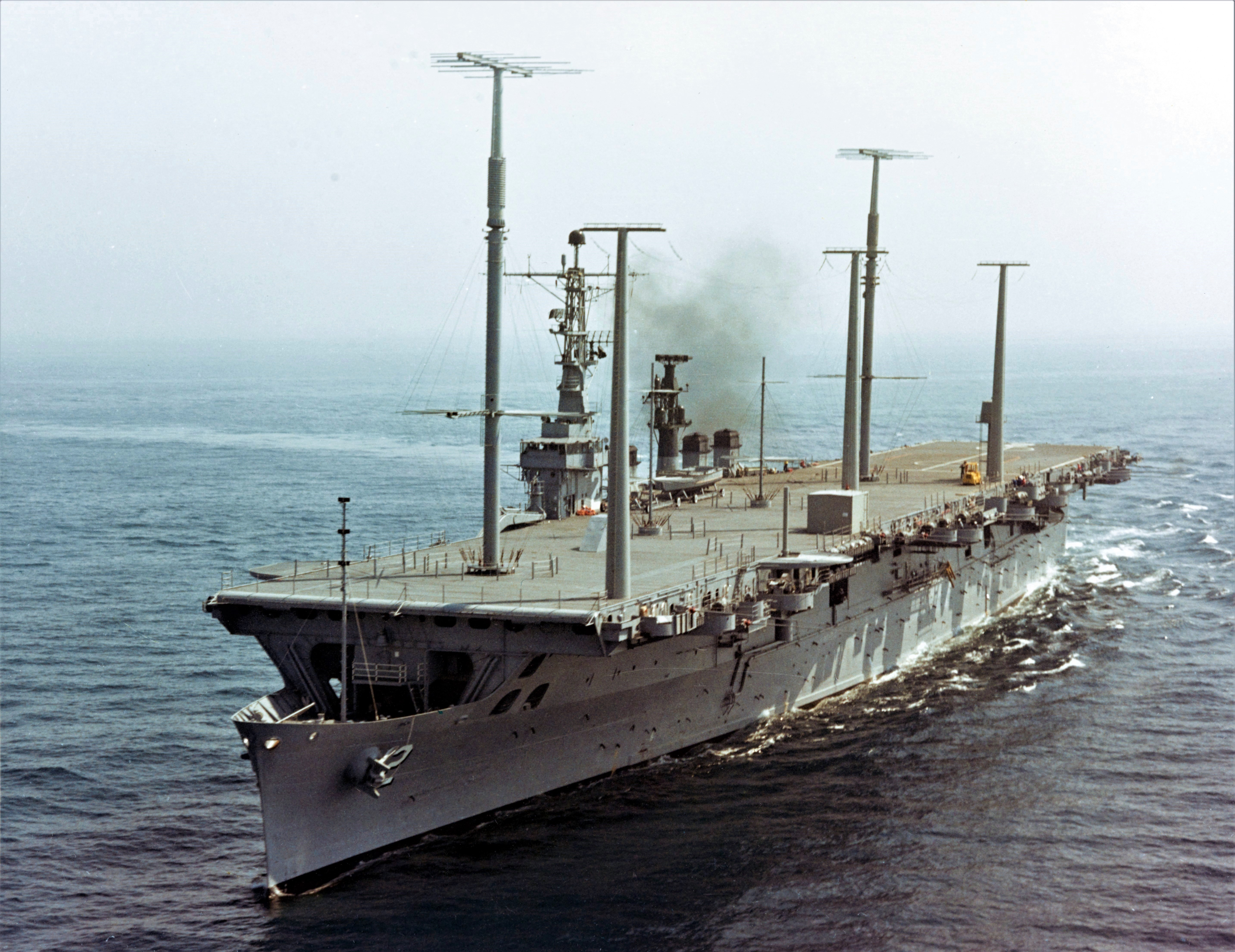
Wright off Southern California in September 1963

The National Emergency Command Post Afloat (NECPA) was part of the United States government's Continuity of Operations plans during the 1960s. It was one-third of a triad composed of airborne, ground, and sea-based assets.

== History ==
In October 1961, the Joint Chiefs of Staff approved the NECPA plan, directing initial operating capability (IOC) by 1 March 1962. United States Atlantic Command converted the cruiser Northampton in March 1962, and the light carrier Wright in 1963 for NECPA duties. The United States Navy began alternating the ships in mid-1964, to keep one at sea and the other in port at any time. The Northampton was marginally upgraded for NECPA duties, since it was due for replacement; however, the Wright was more heavily modified to hold the National Command Authorities for indefinite periods.

The software was developed by the Naval Electronics Laboratory, San Diego. The product was turned over for acceptance and administration to the Naval Command and Systems Support Activity (NAVCOSSACT), Washington Navy Yard, Washington, DC.

The nuclear submarine USS Triton (SSRN-586) was considered for the NECPA role in the early 1960s after its original radar picket mission became obsolete, but no such conversion has been documented.

== Communications ==
A permanent UHF ground station (located in Waldorf, Maryland), served as the primary communications link between the separate command posts: National Military Command Center, Alternate National Military Command Center, National Emergency Airborne Command Post, and NECPA. Three ground communications vans were located at Otis AFB, MA, Greenville, SC, and Homestead AFB, FL to cover commonly used routes of Presidential aircraft. After the assassination of President John F. Kennedy, vans were moved to Jackson, MS and Austin, TX, to cover President Lyndon B. Johnson’s travel routes.

== See also ==
- Boeing E-4 National Emergency Airborne Command Post, a similar concept in an airplane.
- Ground-Mobile Command Center
- Post Attack Command and Control System (PACCS)
- Worldwide Military Command and Control System (WWMCCS)
