= Survivable Communications Integration System =

The Survivable Communications Integration System was the replacement missile early warning communication system. SCIS was a program replacement awarded in the 1980s. The system was designed and delivered (late), with final introduction in the late 1990s.

In a GAO article published in 1992, E-Systems (the prime contractor) was significantly over budget and significantly delayed.

Management and development problems with the SCIS program have contributed to a 65 percent increase in program costs (from $142 million to $234 million) and a 3-year delay in completion (from 1992 to 1995). After working on SCIS for 4 years, the prime contractor was unable to deliver a system that could process sensor data fast enough to meet Air Force specifications. To help solve the problem, the Air Force is allowing the contractor to replace the computer platform, for the second time at government expense, with a faster, more powerful model.

== External articles ==
- Article title
