= Deep Underground Command Center =

U.S. military bunker proposal

The Deep Underground Command Center (DUCC), sometimes also called the Deep Underground Command and Control Site (DUCCS), was a United States military installation that was proposed on January 31, 1962, to be "a very deep underground center close to the Pentagon, perhaps 3,000–4,000 feet (914–1,219 meters) down, protected to withstand direct hits by high-yield weapons and endure about 30 days in a post-attack period."

== Development ==
The DUCC would have been built as "an austere 50-man … or an expanded 300-man version (with the former built to permit expansion into the latter, if desired)". It was designed to withstand multiple direct hits of 200 to 300 megaton weapons bursting at the surface or 100 MT weapons penetrating to depths of 70–100 feet (21–30 meters). Based on Strategic Air Command's Deep Underground Support Center (DUSC) planned near the Cheyenne Mountain Complex nuclear bunker, the DUCC plan was recommended to President John F. Kennedy for fiscal year 1965 funding shortly before his assassination, but the underground DUCC, SAC's DUSC, and NORAD's Super Combat Centers were never built.

Decades later, Spurgeon M. Keeny Jr., who served as an advisor to five presidential administrations from the 1950s to the 1970s, recalled President Lyndon B. Johnson's reaction to the proposed site:

... Johnson, despite his growing preoccupation with Vietnam, rejected out of hand the use of nuclear weapons there. His view of nuclear war was brought home to me by his reaction at the final meeting in 1965 on the military budget to an item listed as DUCCS. In response to his question as to what this was, he was told it stood for Deep Underground Command and Control Site, a facility that would be located several thousand feet underground, between the White House and the Pentagon, designed to survive a ground burst of a 20-megaton bomb and sustain the president and key advisers for several months until it would be safe to exit through tunnels emerging many miles outside Washington. After a brief puzzled expression, Johnson let loose with a string of Johnsonian expletives making clear he thought this was the stupidest idea he had ever heard and that he had no intention of hiding in an expensive hole while the rest of Washington and probably the United States were burned to a crisp. That was the last I ever heard of DUCCS.

Other contemporary underground installations did see upgrades, such as the 1953 Site R which was "hardened further to about 140 psi blast resistance by 1963," or completion, such as NORAD's Canadian Forces Base (1963), Combat Operations Center, and Space Defense Center (1966).
