= AN/GPA-73 Radar Course Directing Group =

External image
- diagram with images of equipment

The GE AN/GPA-73 Radar Course Directing Group (mobile version AN/CPA-73) was an air defense command, control, and coordination system of the United States Air Force. It was developed for the Electronic Systems Division 412L Air Weapons Control System (colloq. "AWCS 412L") for weapons direction (ground-controlled interception, GCI, by "Fire Direction and Control Equipment"). The AN/GPA-73 was used to create a "Base Air Defense Ground Environment" (BADGE II), for which Air Defense Command had recommended the system as "SAGE back-up (Mode Ill) control of BOMARC" in June 1958. When the GPA-73 was emplaced with the AN/FSA-21 Weapons Control Group computer for GCI, the system created a "miniature SAGE" military installation. The GPA-73 could also direct Project Nike surface-to-air missile fire from Nike Integrated Fire Control sites equipped with the "412 Target Designation System" in the Battery Control Van in a space allocated by February 1957 "behind the Acquition Operator [sic]". and the AN/GPA-73.

The 412L Joint Test Force was located at Myrtle Beach Air Force Base in 1963, testing revealed fragility that limited the unit to fixed emplacements, and "Tactical Air Command subsequently rejected the GPA-73 as part of its mobility forces." The 412L equipment supported "Det 1, 17th Air Force [in] the Allied Sector Operations Center III at Börfink", Germany, which had a nuclear bunker where on July 2, 1975, the 615th Aircraft Control and Warning Squadron temporarily stopped 412L operations [for] Constant Keystone modification." Sites with the AN/GPA-73 planned for the Alaska Semi-Automatic Defense System (ALSADS) were cancelled on January 26, 1960, and the last "operational 412L equipment" was used by USAFE in Germany.

In accordance with the Joint Electronics Type Designation System (JETDS), the "AN/GPA-73" designation represents the 73rd design of an Army-Navy electronic device for ground radar auxiliary system. The JETDS system also now is used to name all Department of Defense electronic systems.

== Description ==
The GPA-73 included the following equipment (quantity in parentheses):

- AN/GKA-10 & AN/GKA-11 Converter Groups (RCA)
- AN/GKA-13 Monitor Transmitter Group (RCA)
- AN/GKA-12 Receiver Group (General Electric Company — Defense Systems Department)
- Data Processing and Display Subsystem
  - AN/FSA-12 Detector-Tracker Group, Radar
    - OA-3253 Track Data Processor
    - OA-3254 Tracker Auxiliary Unit
    - OA-3255 Digital Tracker
    - OA-3263 Radar Detector
    - OA-1723 Surveillance-Identification Group
    - OA-3102 Surveillance Console
    - OA-3103 Identification Console
    - OA-3217 Radar Data Processor
    - OA-3219 Surveillance-ID Data Converter
  - OA-1724 Site-to-Site Data Link Group
    - OA-3104 Data Link Central
    - OA-3252 Battery Data Link
    - OA-3327 Message Processor
    - OA-3329 Coordinate Converter
  - OA-1718 Height Data Group
    - OA-3208 Height Data Display Converter
    - OA-3209 Height Data Programmer
    - OA-3403 Height Data Console [from "MPS-14 radar"]
    - OA-3403 Height Data Console [from "MPS-16 radar"]
  - OA-3216 Status Display Group
  - OA-3233 Situation Projection Group
- AN/FSA-21 Weapons Control Group
  - OA-3161 Data Storage Unit
  - OA-3162 Digital Computer
  - OA-3179 (3) Weapons Display Converter
  - OA-3183 (4) Weapons Control Console
  - OA-3180 Computer Auxiliary Unit
  - OA-3210 Ground-to-Air Coupler
  - OA-3264 (2) Core Memory
  - OA-3436 Tape Transport Unit
- AN/FSA-23 Jammer Tracker Group
  - OA-3223 Azimuth Tracker
  - OA-3224 (2) Jammer Tracker Console
  - OA-3227 Jammer Tracker Display Converter
- OA-3232 Performance Monitor Group
  - OA-3237 Performance Monitor Console
  - OA-3393 Confidence Indicator Console
  - OA-3422 Performance Monitor Display Converter
  - ID-936 Site Equipment Status Display
  - (Portable) Trouble Analyzer
- Prime Power Group
  - Power Supply Sets
  - OA-3169 (4) Data Processing Power Supply
- Communication Subsystem
  - OA-3261 Crosstell Input Group
  - Electronic Switching Center
- Flight Control Package
  - Subscriber Sets
  - AN/TRC-24
  - R-278
  - R-361
  - T-217
  - BC-639
  - AN/FGC-25
  - AN/FGC-20
- Ancillary Subsystem
  - Temperature Control Group
- Data Acquisition Subsystem
  - AN/FSA-31 Radar Signal Processor
  - OA-3247 Comparator
  - OA-3250 Integrator

== See also ==
- List of radars
- List of military electronics of the United States
