= Bomb Alarm System =

Joint US–UK nuclear explosion detection network (1962–1967)

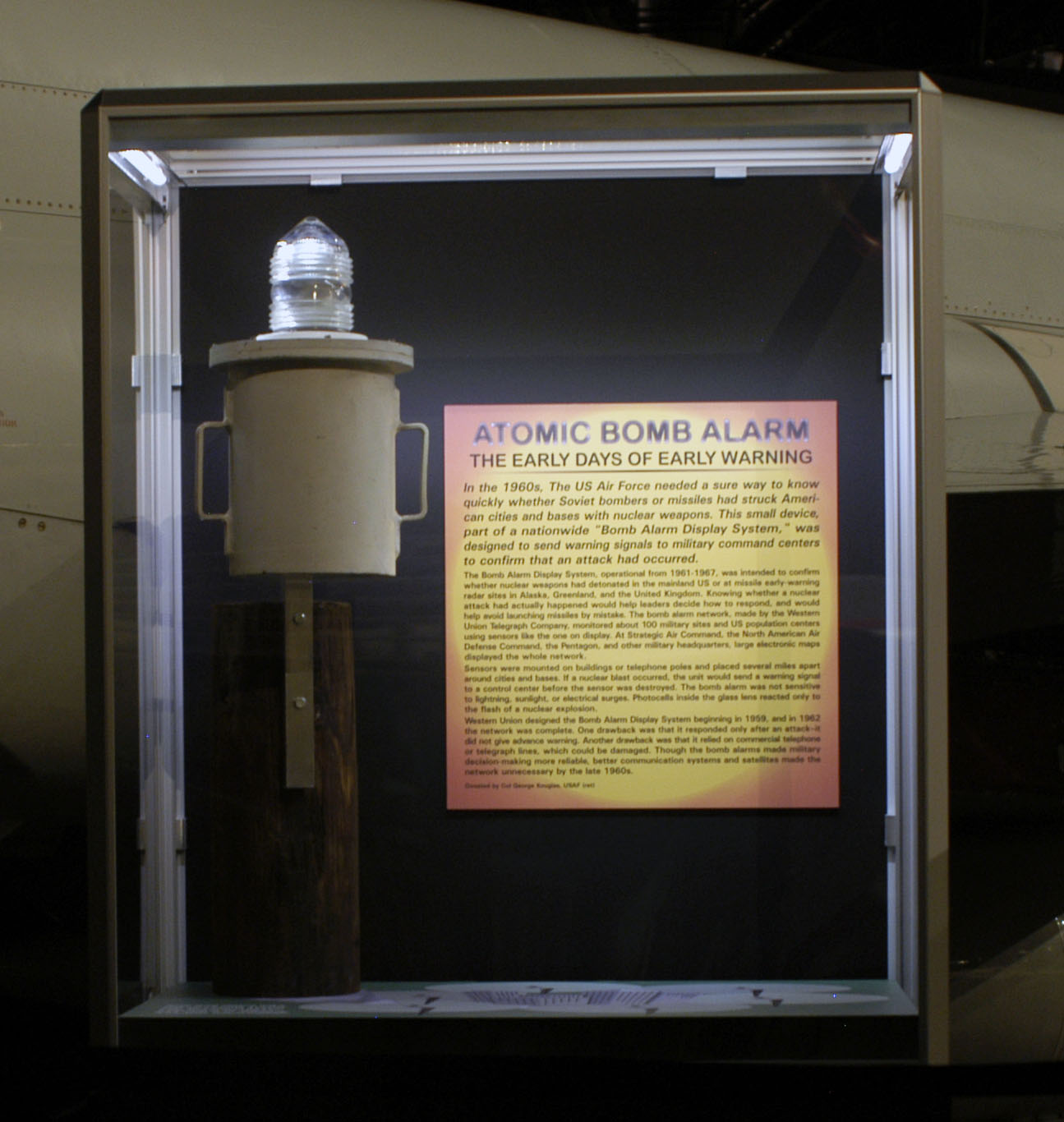
Bomb Alarm System sensor

The Bomb Alarm System (also known as the Bomb Alarm Display System) was a US and UK network of optical bhangmeter sensors intended to confirm the detonation of an enemy nuclear weapon near cities or military installations within the US or at US operated early warning radar sites in the UK or Greenland.

The BAS was designed by Western Union in 1959 and was in full operation by 1962. The BAS was the responsibility of the 9th Space Division and operated until 1967.

The BAS sensors were designed to report the occurrence of a nuclear flash via telephone or telegraph lines before the sensor was destroyed by the explosion. They were designed to ignore spurious signals from lightning, sunlight, or electrical surges.

== See also ==
- Strategic Air Command
- Pinetree Line contemporary early warning RADAR.
- National Emergency Alarm Repeater contemporary device.
