= Deep Underground Support Center =

The Deep Underground Support Center (DUSC) was a Strategic Air Command nuclear bunker proposal in 1962 for "a hardened command post...to withstand a 100-megaton weapon with a 0.5 n.m. CEP". Favored for a mine near Cripple Creek, Colorado (west of the Cheyenne Mountain nuclear bunker started in 1961), the DUSC was to be 3,500 ft (1,100 m) deep and be "able to accommodate some 200 people for [30 days] to handle the large volume of data processing and analysis required for strike assessment, as well as follow-on strike and other decisions." Cost estimates for the SAC Control System facility increased to $200 million, and when the operational year slipped from 1965 to 1969, SAC decided in 1963 "for a long-endurance, all airborne concept instead" (Wainstein), and the JCS and OSD concurred with the DUSC project cancellation.

A 1964 geologic assessment by the MITRE Corporation, prepared for the US Air Force, identified and detailed thirteen potential sites that were suitable for a DUSC located under at least 5000 ft (1,500 m) of cover. The studied locations included Mount Washington, New Hampshire; Whiteface Mountain near Lake Placid, New York; the Santa Catalina Mountains near Tucson, Arizona; Cleveland Mountain near Skykomish, Washington; a mountain along Icicle Creek near Leavenworth, Washington; the Chugach Mountains near Chickaloon, Alaska; and Granite Mountain near Big Delta, Alaska.
