= Chidlaw Building =

Former US Air Force facility in Colorado Springs, Colorado

- 2221 East Bijou Street, Colorado Springs
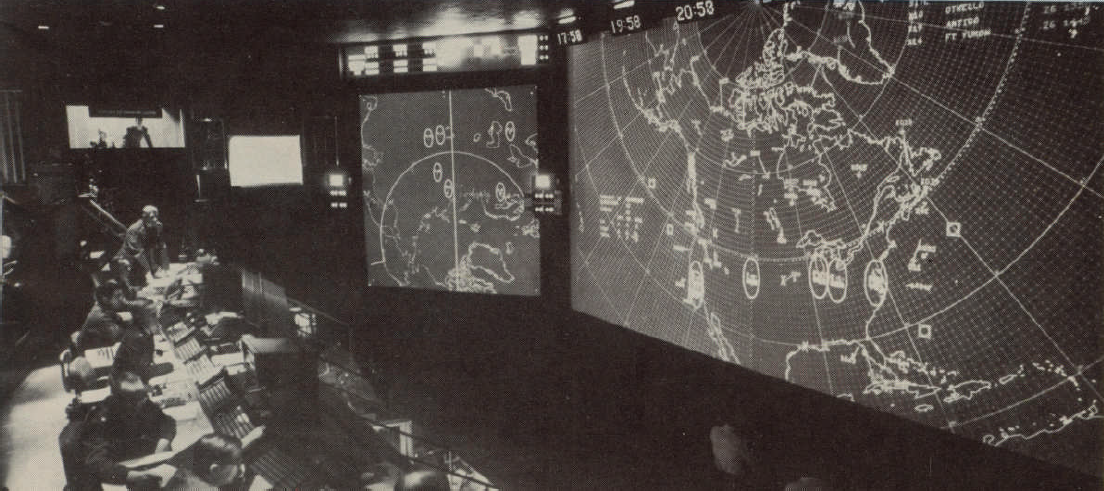
- Chidlaw Building war room, 1964

Location
- Coordinates: 38.8352°N 104.7878°W

Site history
- Built: 30 October 1961 (Groundbreaking); 6 June 1962 (Opening); 7 March 1963 (Dedication)

The Chidlaw Building is a former United States Air Force facility located in the Knob Hill neighborhood of Colorado Springs, Colorado. The building was close to, but not within, the Ent Air Force Base complex, and was leased by the military for several decades, housing headquarters for several military commands, starting with the Air Defense Command (ADC) and the North American Aerospace Defense Command (NORAD). When Chidlaw was completed, personnel from multiple locations, including the Ent Air Force Base, were consolidated into the new building.

In 1993, the building was renovated into an office building and housed Premiere Global Services (PGi) as its main tenant. Once PGi moved out in 2011, building occupancy dropped to 45%, but still included a customer service center for Time Warner Cable. The building went into foreclosure in 2012.

== Background ==
By April 1958, North American Aerospace Defense Command (NORAD) informed the Joint Chiefs of Staff of the need for a Ballistic Missile Early Warning System (BMEWS) to be located in a new, underground Combat Operations Center (COC) in the Colorado Springs, Colorado area. Building the Combat Operations Center within a granite mountain in the Colorado Springs area was shown to be the best solution at the lowest cost. NORAD also concluded that it was important to have related commands nearby, such for joint planning and combat readiness, but not so close that they could be destroyed easily at the same time. On 18 March 1959, and upon review of findings by the Corps of Engineers, the Joint Chiefs of Staff determined that Cheyenne Mountain should be the location of the underground facility (Cheyenne Mountain Complex).

While the construction was performed, an interim location for the Zone of Interior BMEWS equipment was to be established in the basement of a building near the base. That way, BMEWS equipment could be utilized as early as 1961 and until the new Combat Operations Center was completed. NORAD said that the only initial active Advanced Intercontinental Ballistic Missile (AICBM) system that could be ready in sufficient numbers to be effective by 1964 was the Nike Zeus, which would integrate the use of radar, anti-missile missiles and atomic warheads. In December 1958, NORAD called for the hasty development of the anti-Intercontinental ballistic missile (ICBM) system, the WS-117L reconnaissance satellite. The Clear Air Force Station system in Alaska was scheduled to be completed in 1961, but the hardened Combat Operation Center would not be operations until sometime after that. So, an interim BMEWS central display facility was built as an annex to the Ent Combat Operation Center. It would not, though, have an interim satellite prediction computer, as that would be placed in the new Cheyenne Mountain facility. In the meantime, each radar site's computer would make its own calculations. The Ent Air Force Base COC annex would not be completed until December 1960, so an interim solution was to be implemented at Thule by September 1960 and until December 1960. SPADATS was transferred to NORAD and CONAD command in November 1960 and was activated at the Ent Air Force Base on 14 February 1961 by the 1st Aerospace Surveillance and Control Squadron, which was also responsible for the operation of the BMEWS Central Computer and Display Facility in the NORAD Operations Center. SPADATS was dedicated at Ent on 3 July 1961, just a few months after excavation began on Cheyenne Mountain.

The plan to use an off-base leased facility was implemented for the Combined Operations Center when the Cheyenne Mountain Air Force Station was delayed and an earlier Semi-Automatic Ground Environment command post was needed as an interim Air Defense Operations Center for combining NORAD's attack warning and CONAD's weapons direction missions.

== Military building ==
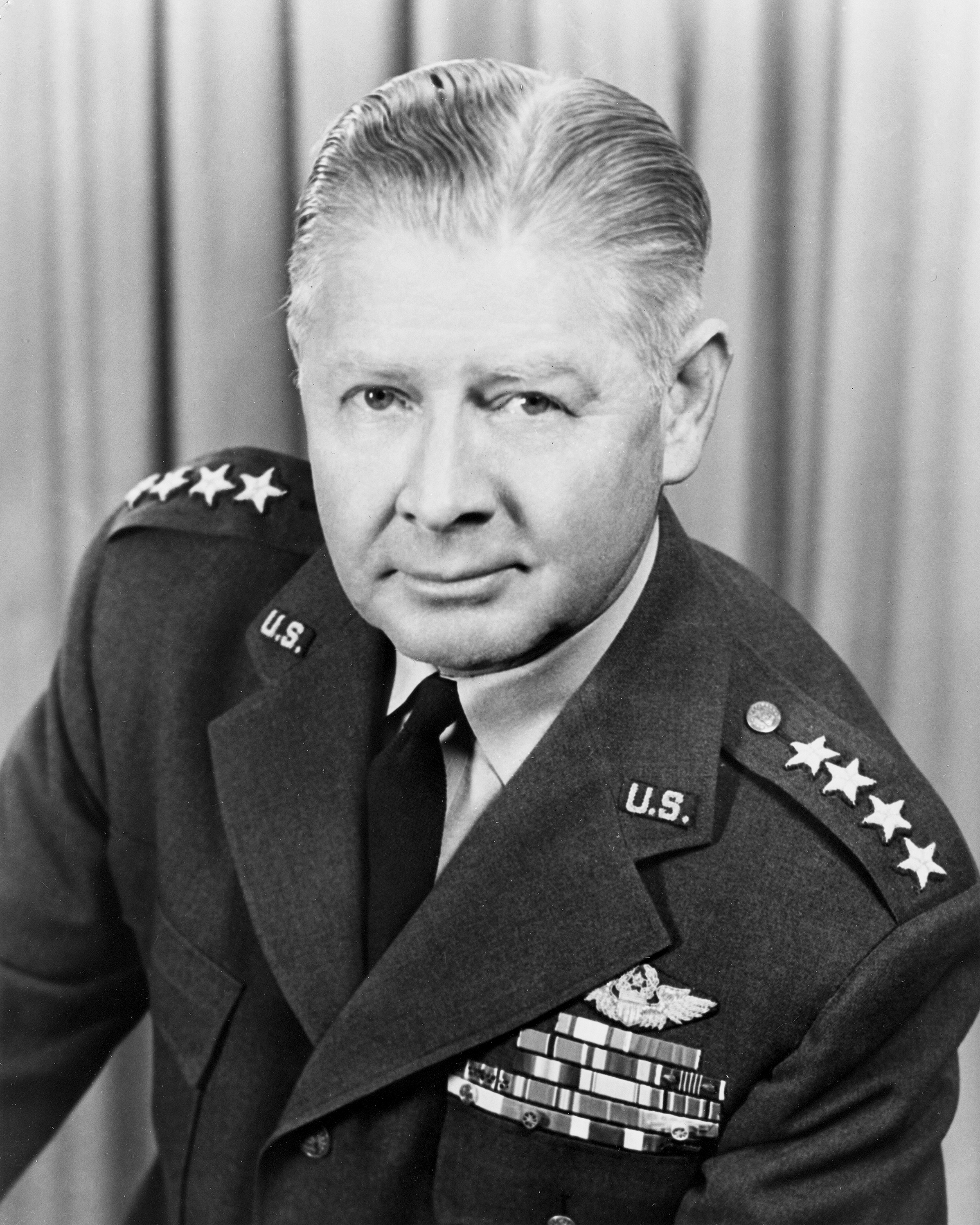
General Benjamin W. Chidlaw was commander of the Air Defense Command (1951-1955) at Ent Air Force Base and then commander of the Joint Service Continental Air Defense Command (1954-1955), which merged the defense forces of all branches of the military under one command in 1957. CONAD joined with the Royal Canadian Air Force in 1957 to become NORAD.

The Chidlaw Building, built in 1963 at 2221 East Bijou Street, Colorado Springs as the headquarters for the Aerospace Defense Command and North American Aerospace Defense Command (NORAD), was named for retired Air Force Gen. Benjamin W. Chidlaw. The 300,000 square feet (28,000 m^{2}) building was built with fortified walls, an auditorium for 174 people, two electrical substations, and elaborate heating and cooling systems. Of three floors, one is underground, and the only windows were those in the lobby.

The Chidlaw Building consolidated Air Defense Command personnel from 14 different locations, including the Ent Air Force Base, into one location. It had command sections for NORAD headquarters, ADTAC headquarters, and an ADTAC command section, and a secure communications complex with links to the Cheyenne Mountain Air Force Station. Facilities included a printing plant, exercise room, cafeteria, and executive dining room. There were also a food store, small base exchange, commercial bank, and Ent Credit Union on site. There was a civilian guard force. Department of Defense graphic artist Terrance Patterson was commissioned to make nine paintings of the evolution of air and space for the building. When the military vacated the building, the paintings were moved to the lobby of the Cheyenne Mountain Air Force Station technical support building.

=== Combined Operation Center ===
The Chidlaw Building's Combined Operations Center was transferred from the Ent AFB combat center. It had an IBM 1410 computer in 1965 for systems analysis, and air defense consoles presenting data from various Air Divisions (e.g., for the Goose Air Defense Sector in Canada). Systems which transmitted data to the building included AN/FSQ-8 Combat Control Centrals at Semi-Automatic Ground Environment (SAGE) Combat Centers which forwarded the divisional air defense status to NORAD.

As the highest echelon of command and control for the SAGE Defense System, the Chidlaw Building was the primary node of NORAD's Alert Network Number 1. The network was to warn military installations with low rate teletype data, like SAC Emergency War Order Traffic that included Positive Control/Noah's Ark instructions through northern NORAD radio sites to confirm or recall SAC bombers if SAC decided to launch the alert force before receiving an execution order from the JCS. The NORAD Combined Operations Center operations was transferred from Ent Air Force Base to the Cheyenne Mountain Complex on 20 April 1966. Space Defense Center at Cheyenne Mountain Complex became fully operational on 6 February 1967.

=== Command headquarters ===
In addition to the Combined Operations Center, the Chidlaw Building housed the headquarters for several military commands:

North American Aerospace Defense Command
Chidlaw Building became the NORAD headquarters in March, 1963. Prior to that Ent Air Force Base had been headquarters. In January 1988, Peterson Air Force Base became NORAD headquarters.

Continental Air Defense Command
CONAD and NORAD offices were consolidated. CONAD was disestablished on 30 June 1975.

Air Space Command / Aerospace Defense Command
Chidlaw was built to consolidate personnel that were on the Ent Air Force Based and 13 other locations in 1963. On 1 July 1975, ADCOM Headquarters were established at the Chidlaw Building when Ent Air Force Base was closing.

Air Defense, Tactical Air Command
On 21 September 1979, the ADTAC headquarters of Major General John L. Piotrowski was established at the Chidlaw Building. ADTAC received Aerospace Defense Command's "atmospheric" assets, including interceptors, bases, and SAGE radar stations) on 1 October 1979. Strategic Air Command assumed responsibility for missile warning and space surveillance systems.

Air Force Space Command
Space Command headquarters activated 1 September 1982, at the Chidlaw Building and moved in November 1987 to Peterson AFB's Building 1 The Chidlaw Building had been the site of the January 1978 presentation to a general-officer review group chaired by new SAC Commander in Chief General Richard H. Ellis and ADCOM Commander General Hill, who formally advocated formation of Space Command.

United States Space Command
During December 1987, 2500 USSPACECOM and AFSPACECOM personnel relocated to their new Headquarters on Peterson AFB [Bldg 1470 (Ent Building) for USSPACECOM] from the Chidlaw Building.

=== Transition and inactivation ===
The Chidlaw Building was an off-site building of the Ent Air Force Base that was leased under an "expensive rental arrangement". The Ent Air Force Base was a complex in Colorado Springs without room for expansion, so the base was closed down in 1975 and became an annex to Peterson Air Force Base. In December 1976, personnel from Ent were moved to Chidlaw and Peterson Air Force Base. By 1979, the General Services Administration had leased the Chidlaw for use by the Air Force. A plan calling for a realignment, or distribution, of the Aerospace Defense Command responsibilities and assets to the Tactical Air Command, Strategic Air Command, and the Air Force Communication Services. It also included distributing personnel from Chidlaw to other military locations and deactivating the Aerospace Defense Command/.

By the late 1980s, the functions performed within the building were moved to other military installations. USSPACECOM and NORAD headquarters were moved to Peterson Building 470.

When preparing to move furniture from Chidlaw's Air Defense Command war room to Peterson Air Force Base, Tony Wells was surprised to find the chair that President John F. Kennedy sat in when he received a Cheyenne Mountain briefing on 5 June 1963. The chair, which had a plaque affixed to the underside of the chair to commemorate the occasion, was then placed in the Peterson Air and Space Museum.

== Office building ==
Several million dollars were spent since 1993 to gut the building, make numerous improvements and turn it into office space. Lars Akerberg purchased the building in 1993, and Premiere Global Services (PGi), which operated a teleconference center, became its largest tenant.

The building went into foreclosure in early 2012 with an occupancy rate of only 45% after Premier Global had moved out the previous year. According to Turner Commercial Research, the city's office vacancy rate (14.5%) is almost three times what it was in 2000. Buildings like the Chidlaw struggle to compete with modern buildings that are more conveniently located either along the Interstate 25 corridor or within downtown Colorado Springs.

Current tenants as of 2022:

- Jacobs Federal Now Amentum (company) in 2024
- Charter Communications
- Dental corporate offices
