= Cheyenne Mountain Complex =

Training complex located in El Paso County, Colorado

- Near Colorado Springs, Colorado, United States
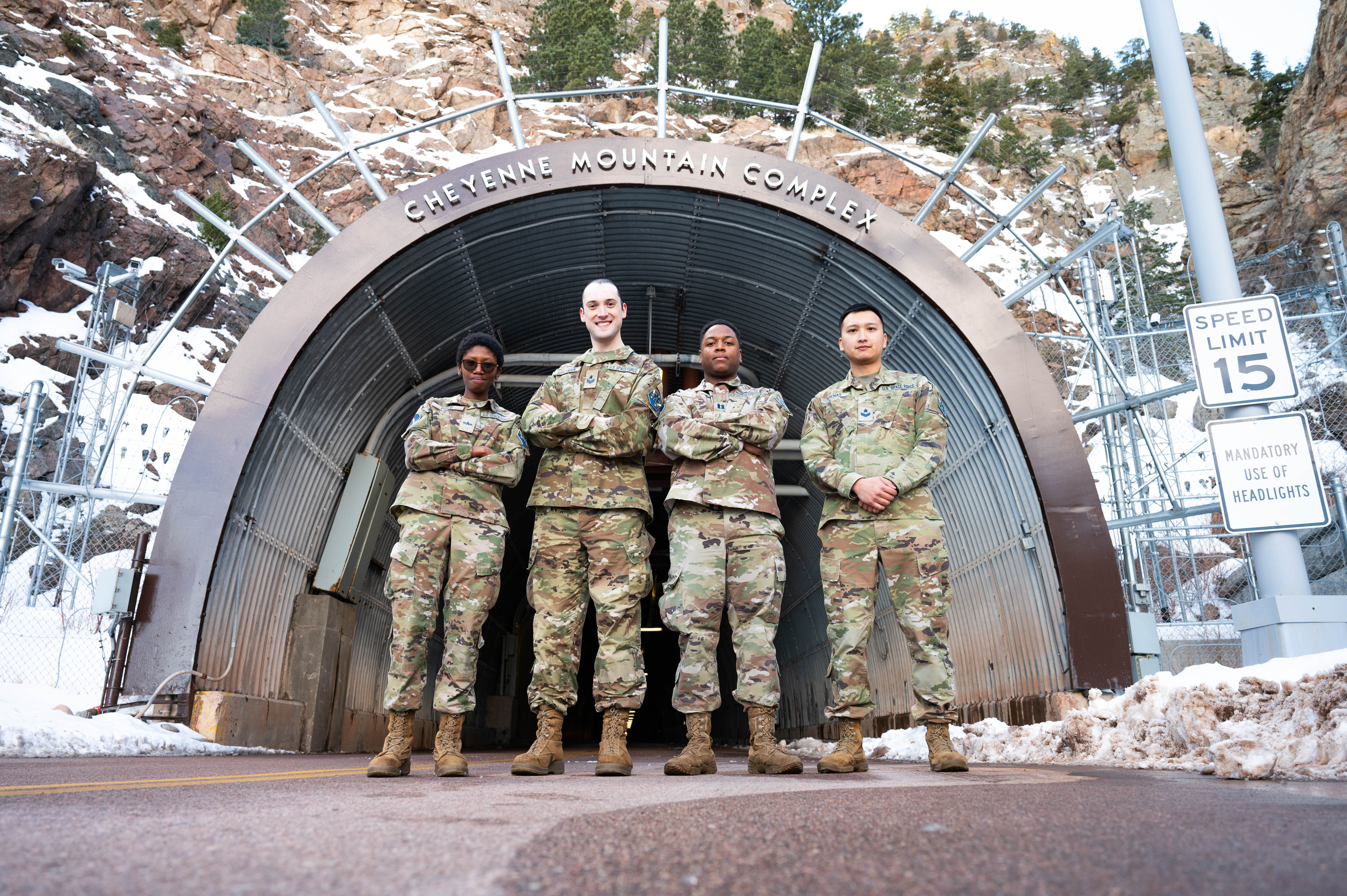

Site information
- Type: Alternate operations center for United States Northern Command and North American Aerospace Defense Command
- Owner: United States
- Operator: United States Space Force United States Air Force Royal Canadian Air Force
- Controlled by: Space Base Delta 1
- Condition: Active

Location
- Location within the United States Location within Colorado Location within North America
- Coordinates: 38°44′33″N 104°50′54″W

Site history
- Built: May 18, 1961 – February 8, 1966
- In use: Cheyenne Mountain Complex; NORAD Cheyenne Mountain Complex (January 20, 1965)

Garrison information
- Occupants: Canada, United States

The Cheyenne Mountain Complex (CMOC) (Note: Also known as Cheyenne Mountain Operations Center.) is a non-public military installation of the United States Department of Defense (Note: The current administration styles the Department as the "Department of War".) located inside Cheyenne Mountain, in El Paso County, Colorado. It is the training complex for crew qualification, and is an alternate command center for the North American Aerospace Defense Command (NORAD), and United States Northern Command (USNORTHCOM). The installation was established in February 1967 as a bunker and operations center, and was designed to be partially resistant to attack by nuclear-tipped missiles. Built and owned by the Department of Defense, it also has Royal Canadian Air Force personnel serving there.

The Cold War meant that hardened installations resistant to attacks by the Soviet Union were necessary. The initial funds for its construction amounted to $142.4 million. During the September 11, 2001, terror attacks, the complex was locked down, and it later continued normal operations. During 2008, NORAD and USNORTHCOM were relocated, and the installation was re-designated as the alternate main operations center. Since that time, Peterson Space Force Base, located in Colorado Springs, Colorado, is responsible for managing the installation.

== Construction ==
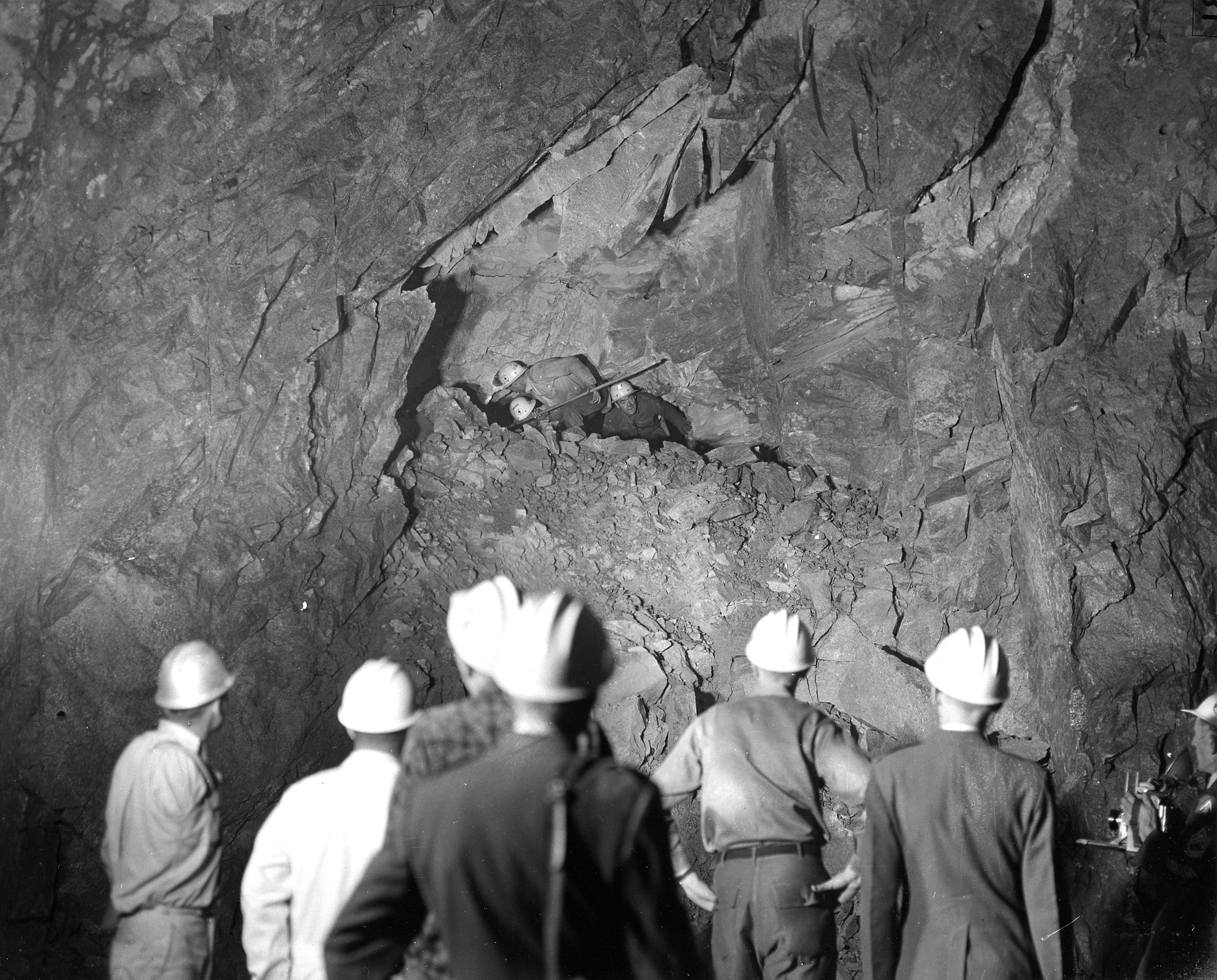
Construction workers at the drill site

Significant confrontations and drastic nuclear threats occurred during the Korean War, the First and Second Taiwan Strait Crisis, the Berlin Crisis of 1961, and more broadly the Cuban Missile Crisis. As a result of increasing tensions, the United States and Canada created the North American Air Defense Command. By the late 1950s, missiles from Cuba could reach the United States quicker than ever before. A proposal was developed for an airspace command and control center to shelter multiple major Department of Defense components concerning nuclear missiles and detection to more effectively deter long-ranged Soviet bombers. Personnel at the complex developed techniques to raise the chance of detection of a Soviet attack.

Strategic Air Command began construction at Bare Mountain, Massachusetts, for the Eighth Air Force. It was the first bunker capable of surviving a nuclear blast and designed so that the senior military staff could facilitate further military operations. The excavation of the mountainous terrain on Cheyenne Mountain in the vicinity of Colorado Springs, Colorado began on May 18, 1961, by the United States Army Corps of Engineers for the construction of the North American Air Defense Command primary Combat Operations Center. The Utah Construction & Mining Company was selected for drilling and blasting into Cheyenne Mountain. The Burroughs Corporation would create the electronics and communications system that centralized and automated the instantaneous (one-millionth of a second) evaluation of aerospace surveillance data. On February 6, 1967, the Cheyenne Mountain Complex was operational. The Space Defense Center moved from Ent AFB to the complex in 1967. The Space Defense Command's 1st Aerospace Control Squadron would also be relocated to Cheyenne Mountain. By January 4, 1967, the National Civil Defense Warning Center was in the bunker.

Two systems and commands were made operational in 1967:

- The NORAD Attack Warning System,
- Combat Operations Command, and the Delta I computer system, which recorded and monitored every detected space system. The Combat Operations Command would later be renamed the Cheyenne Mountain Operations Command.

== Formation ==
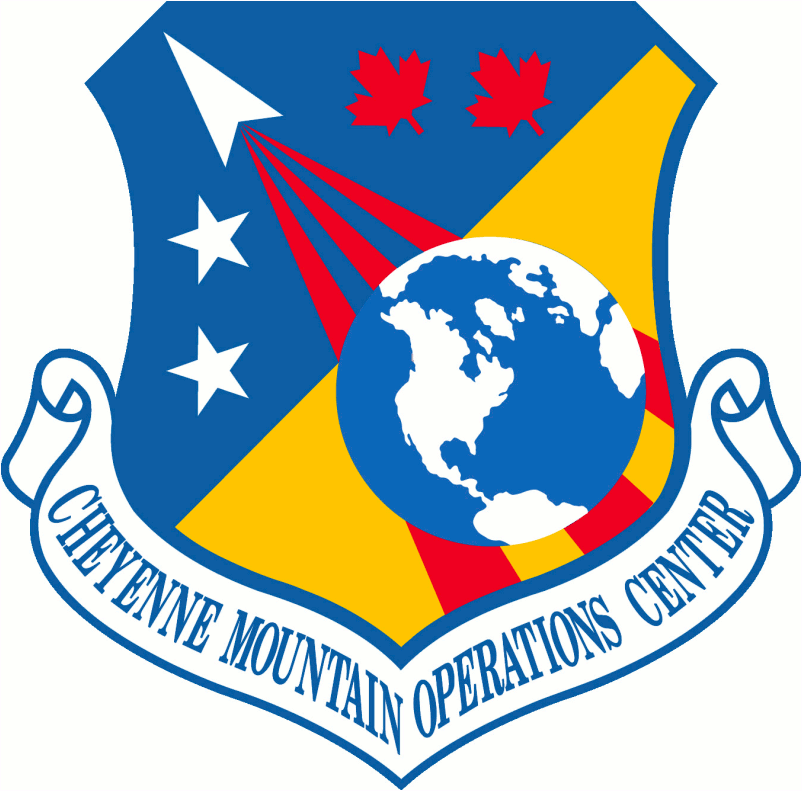
Cheyenne Mountain Operations Center (CMOC) insignia

After the installation's initial construction, the Electronic Systems Division Detachment operating at Ent Air Force Base, serving as the Cheyenne Mountain Management Office, closed on October 1, 1976. Later on, the Aerospace Defense Command was assigned to the Cheyenne Mountain Complex until it was deactivated in 1980. Both NORAD and USNORTHCOM staffed the Space Surveillance Center in the same room as the Missile Warning Center, separated by partitions. The headquarters of the Cheyenne Mountain support groups was established at the Cheyenne Mountain Complex in October 1981. Providing aid to the Aerospace Defense Center's operation of NORAD's primary combat operations center. In 1983 the Foreign Technology Division had an operating location at the bunker and in 1992, an airman of the "1010th Civil Engineering Squadron at Cheyenne Mountain Air Force Base" developed a 3-D AutoCAD model of the bunker "to zoom in on a specific room". In 1995, a "missile operations section" supported the missile warning center. During 1989−2001 it was managed by 1st Airborne Command Control Squadron at the Cheyenne Mountain Air Force Station, and later was renamed to the 1st Space Control Squadron.

Several variants of the Soviet R-36 (missile) had single 18–25 megaton warheads targeted on complexes such as Cheyenne Mountain:

The citadel that had been built to ensure official survival during a planetary holocaust was, by then, sure to be among the initial targets struck by those ICBMs—perhaps a dozen or more warheads—to ensure a “first strike kill.” Our job was simply to detect the coming nuclear attack by the Soviets and act quickly enough to coordinate a retaliatory strike—to ensure that the Soviet part of the planet went down—before we, too, were obliterated.

== Cold War ==
The System Development Corporation updated Air Defense Command satellite information processing systems for $15,850,542 on January 19, 1973. The improvements were primarily to the Space Computational Center's displays and application software, which was updated to provide real-time positioning of orbiting space systems for the NORAD Combat Operation Center. The first phase, which established a system integrator and modernized the communications to a major data processing system, was completed in October 1972.

The Ballistic Missile Defense Center (BMDC) BW 1.2 release was installed in February 1974 in the Combat Operations Center, under the command of CONAD. The Safeguard command and control system, operated by the commander, communicated warnings, observation data, and attack assessment to the Combat Operations Center. It was also designed to release nuclear weapons. By 1978, five operating centers and a command post were housed within the NORAD Combat Operations Center. The Space Computational Center catalogued and tracked space objects, while the Intelligence Center analyzed intelligence data. The System Center consolidated information and displayed it in the Command Post, and the Weather Support Unit monitored weather patterns at both the local and global levels.

The NORAD Commander's wartime staff reported to the Battle Staff Support Center.The Space Defense Operations Center (SPADOC), established on October 1, 1979, consolidated United States Air Force satellite survivability, space surveillance, and US ASAT operations into one wartime space activities hub at the NORAD Cheyenne Mountain Complex. Space surveillance and missile warning functions were performed by the Core Processing Segment (CPS) using Worldwide Military Command and Control System's Honeywell H6080 computers at the SPADOC Computational Center (SCC) and NORAD Computer System (NCS). A third computer was an operational backup for SCC or NCS. By 1981, the H6080 failed to meet the requirements for timely computations. SPADATS was deactivated about 1980, although some of its logic continued in SPADOC systems.

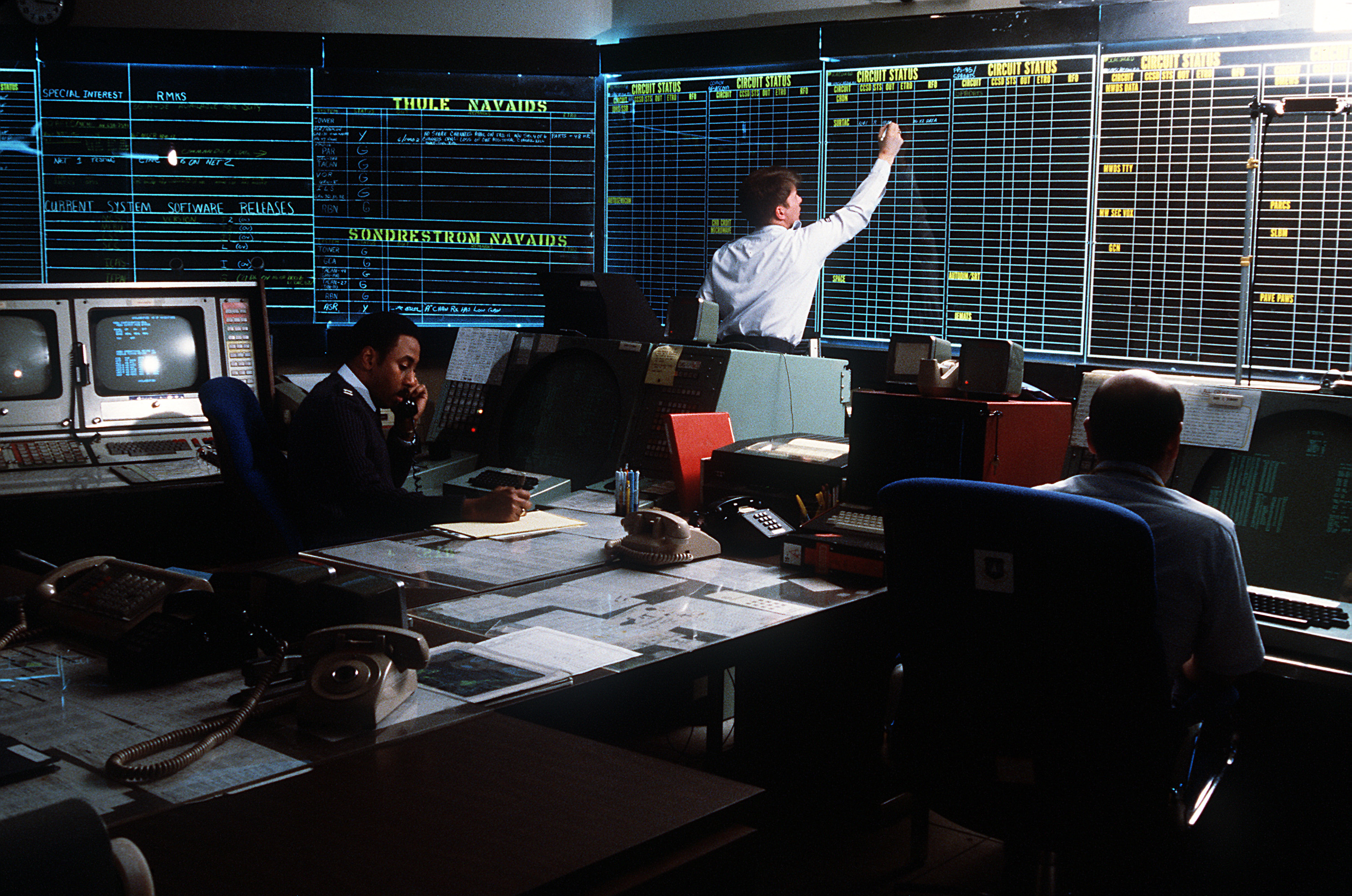
System Control Room, 1984

NORAD had a series of warning and assessment systems that were not fully automated in the Cheyenne Mountain complex until the 1970s. In 1979, the Cheyenne Mountain Complex Improvements Program 427M system became fully operational. It was a consolidated Cheyenne Mountain Upgrade program for command center, space, ballistic missile, and space functions, developed using new software technology and designed for computers with large processing capacity. There were three major segments of the 427M system: the Communication System Segment (CSS), NORAD Computer System (NCS), and Space Computational Center (SCC).

The 425L Command and Control System, Display Information Processor, Command Center Processing System, and other hardware were replaced by the NORAD Computer System (NCS). The new system was designed to centralize several databases, improve online display capabilities, and consolidate mission warning information processing and transmission. It was intended to have greater reliability and quicker early warning capability. The Command Center Processing System's original UNIVAC 1106, re-purposed for Mission Essential Back-up Capability (MEBU), was upgraded to the more robust UNIVAC 1100/42. The 427M system, intended to modernize systems and improve performance, was initially "wholly ineffective" and resulted in several failures of the Worldwide Military Command and Control System (WWMCCS) system.

In 1979 and 1980, there were a few instances when false missile warnings were generated by the Cheyenne Mountain complex systems. For instance, a computer chip "went haywire" and issued false missile warnings, which raised the possibility that a nuclear war could be started accidentally, based on incorrect data. Staff analyzed the data and found that the warnings were erroneous, and the systems were updated to identify false alarms. Gen. James V. Hartinger of the Air Force stated that "his primary responsibility is to provide Washington with what he calls 'timely, unambiguous, reliable warning' that a raid on North America has begun." He explained that there were about 6,700 messages generated on average each hour in 1979 and 1980, and all had been processed without error. An off-site testing facility was established in Colorado Springs by NORAD in late 1979 or early 1980 so that system changes could be tested off-line before they were moved into production. Following another failure in 1980, a bad computer chip was updated, and staff and commander processes were improved to better respond to warnings.

The threat of crewed bomber aircraft was slowly superseded by intercontinental ballistic missiles. So the Air Force's Aerospace Defense Command was inactivated in 1980, and the few fighters and radar control arrangements remaining refashioned as Air Defense, Tactical Air Command.

The Cheyenne Mountain Upgrade (CMU) of November 1988, designed to consolidate five improvement programs, was not installed because it was not compatible with other systems at Cheyenne Mountain, and it did not meet the defined specifications according to deficiencies identified during testing. The five improvement programs were the CCPDS Replacement (CCPDS-R), CSS Replacement (CSS-R), Granite Sentry upgrade, SCIS, and SPADOC 4. SPADOC 4 was for upgrading the SCC with primary and backup 3090-200J mainframes), and SPADOC 4 block A achieved initial operating capability (IOC) in April 1989. The CSS-R "first element" achieved IOC on April 12, 1991; and the 427M system was replaced c. 1992. The CSSR, SCIS, Granite Sentry, CCPDS-R, and their interfaces were tested in 1997. Testing of Granite Sentry nuclear detonation (NUDET) data processing system found it to be inadequate.

The Joint Surveillance System (JSS), developed under an agreement with the Canadian government, became fully operational in seven Region Operations Control Centers (ROCCs) on December 23, 1983. The Joint Surveillance System was implemented to replace Semi-Automatic Ground Environment (SAGE).

In 1986, Congress approved development of the Survivable Communications Integration System (SCIS) to communicate missile warning messages simultaneously over many forms of media, but it was subject to delays and cost overruns. By 1992, the project was estimated to be delayed to 1995 and cost projected to increase from $142 million to $234 million.

Following the Iraqi invasion of Kuwait, the Cheyenne Mountain Complex provided increased radar and satellite monitoring, communication, and heavy reconnaissance in the region.

== Post-Cold War ==
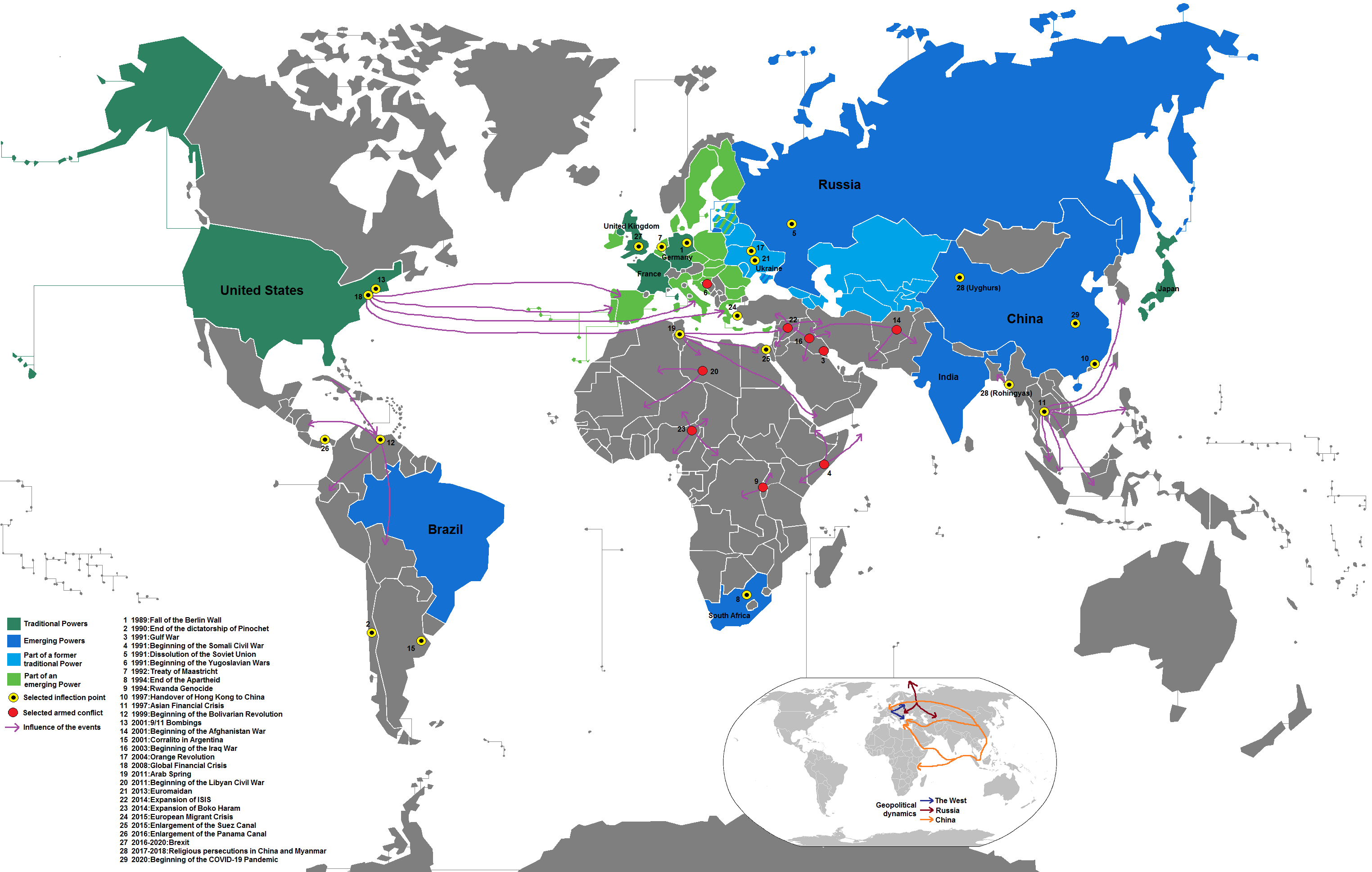
A Post-Cold War geopolitical map

In June 1993, the Cheyenne Mountain Complex Operations Center had the USSPACE and NORAD Command Center, NORAD Air Defense Operations Center (ADOC), NORAD/USSPACECOM Combined Intelligence Watch Center (CIWC), USSPACECOM Space Defense Operations Center (SPADOC), USSPACECOM Space Surveillance Center (SSC), AFSPACECOM Weather Operations Center, and the AFSPACECOM Systems Center within its facility. Plans to house the USSPACECOM and NORAD command centers in the same location began by July 1994. A $450 million upgrade was made to the missile warning center beginning in February 1995. The effort was part of a $1.7 billion renovation program for Cheyenne Mountain.

'Granite Sentry' was an improvement program for the complex. It aimed "to provide a Message Processing Subsystem and a Video Distribution Subsystem, and [to upgrade] the NORAD Computer System display capability and four major centers: (1) the Air Defense Operations Center, (2) the NORAD Command Center, (3) the Battle Staff Support Center, and (4) the Weather Support Unit." It was also to process and display "nuclear detection data provided from the Integrated Correlation and Display System." For $230 million, the program was also to "replace display screens of the Attack Warning and Attack Assessment System." It was delayed from 1993 to 1996.

On June 24, 1994, the Joint Task Force of CMOC formed to lead the reorganization of the complex, merging NORAD and USSPACECOM's centers into one organization. Brig. Gen. Donald Peterson commanded the Joint Task Force. The center was renamed the "U.S. Space Command Cheyenne Mountain operations center" by March 1995.

== Twenty-first century ==
The Combatant Commander's Integrated Command and Control System (CCIC2S) program began in 2000 during a Lockheed Martin contract. During 2003 the Ground-Based Mid-Course Defense (GMD) was contracted for Cheyenne Mountain, at Command Center operations to Peterson Space Force Base During August 3, 2011, a ribbon cutting ceremony was held, celebrating the January 2010 – June 30, 2011, Missile Warning Center renovation that was funded by United States Strategic Command. During 2015, Admiral William E. Gortney, commander of NORAD and NORTHCOM, announced a $700 million contract with Raytheon to move systems into the complex to shield it from electromagnetic pulse attack, with additional work to be done at Vandenberg and Offutt. According to Gortney, "because of the very nature of the way that Cheyenne Mountain's built, it's EMP-hardened. And so, there's a lot of movement to put capability into Cheyenne Mountain and to be able to communicate in there".

On July 28, 2006, the Cheyenne Mountain Realignment redesignated the Cheyenne Mountain Directorate to the Cheyenne Mountain Division. In 2004 the bunker included the 17th Test Squadron's Detachment 2 and AFTAC's research laboratory, in 2008 Detachment 1 of the 392d Training Squadron operated the Cheyenne Mountain Training System (CMTS), and in 2011 the installation's 721st SFS was expanded. Granite Sentry and other Cheyenne Mountain Upgrade interfaces were tested in 1997, and Granite Sentry's processing regarding "simulated [nuclear] detonation messages...injected into the Defense Support Program Data Distribution Center [was] not adequate...".

On the 40th anniversary of the Complex completion, then-Vice President of the United States, Mike Pence, visited the complex on June 24, 2017, to discuss the recent reactivation of the National Space Council.

The Cheyenne Mountain Complex is sometimes referred to as "America's Fortress" due to its function as the alternate missile warning command center for both Canada and the United States.

== Layout and facilities ==
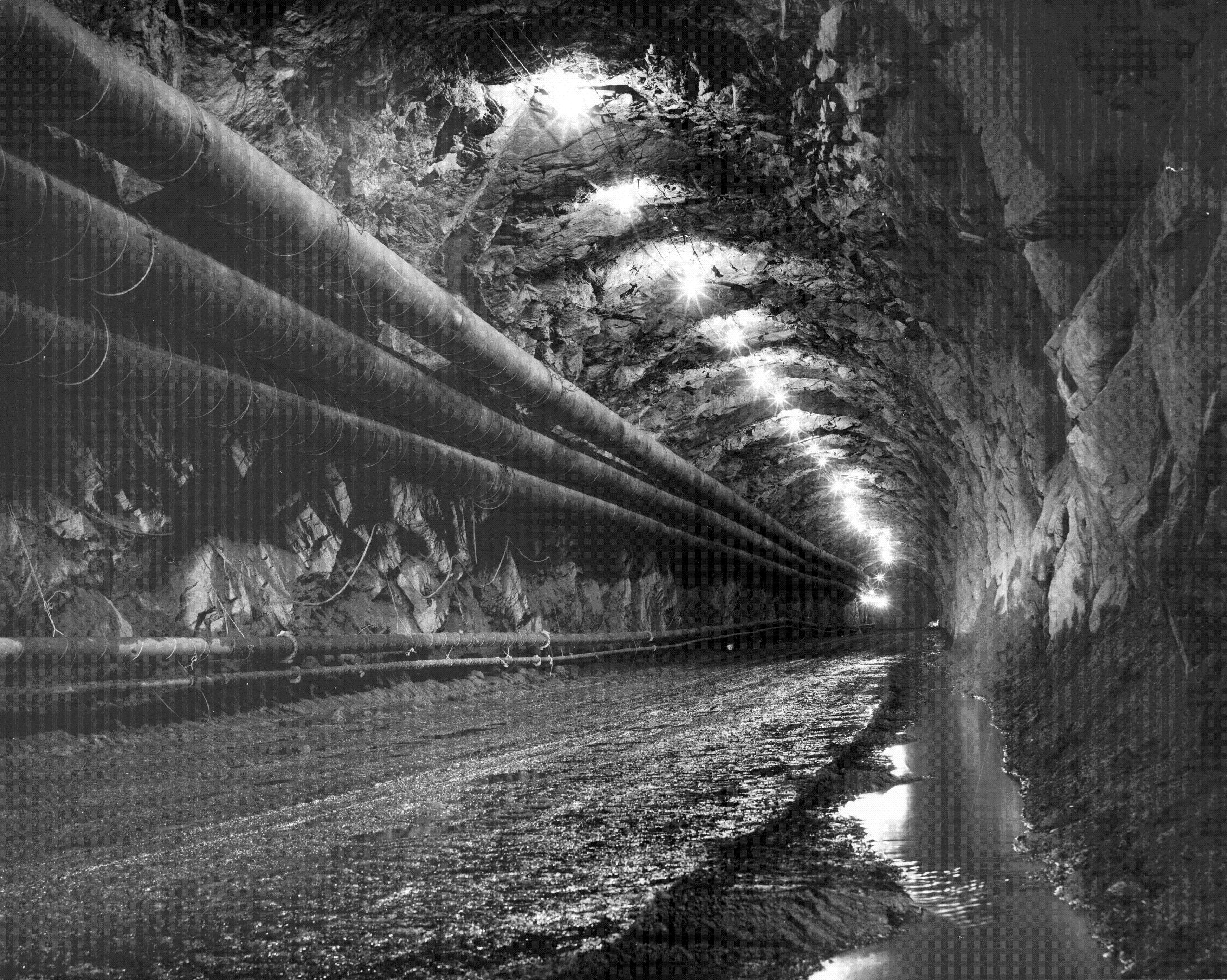
Cheyenne Mountain Complex tunnel and pipes

The Complex has been used for crew training and as a secondary command center since 2008. It is currently operated by NORAD, the Air Weather Service, Federal Emergency Management Agency (FEMA), and the United States Civil Defense Early Warning Center.

The Complex spans approximately 5.1 acres (2.1 hectares) and includes a visitors center, a shooting range and a parking lot, for the operators and crew members. The area used to enter to the Complex is a road in a nearby neighborhood to the west of Cheyenne Mountain State Park. The parking lot is halfway up Cheyenne Mountain. It contains a primary command center and blast doors, and crew members and service members are commonly transported by a white bus. During peacetime, the entryway to the Complex will often have the bunker doors open. The Cheyenne Mountain Complex includes a hiking trail built in 2018 and a biking trail.

== Infrastructure ==
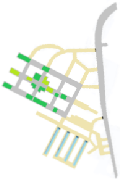
Diagram of tunnels to buildings within the mountain:
- Access Tunnel (right) with North and South openings at the mountain's east slope,
- side tunnels to the main chambers and the support area,
- a support area including reservoirs (blue), and
- main chambers (gray grid) for the centers (dark green buildings are 3-story) with 3 tunnels 45 feet (14 m) wide, 60.5 feet (18.4 m) high, and 588 feet (179 m) long intersected by 4 cross tunnels 32 feet (9.8 m) wide, 56 feet (17 m) high and 335 feet (102 m) long.

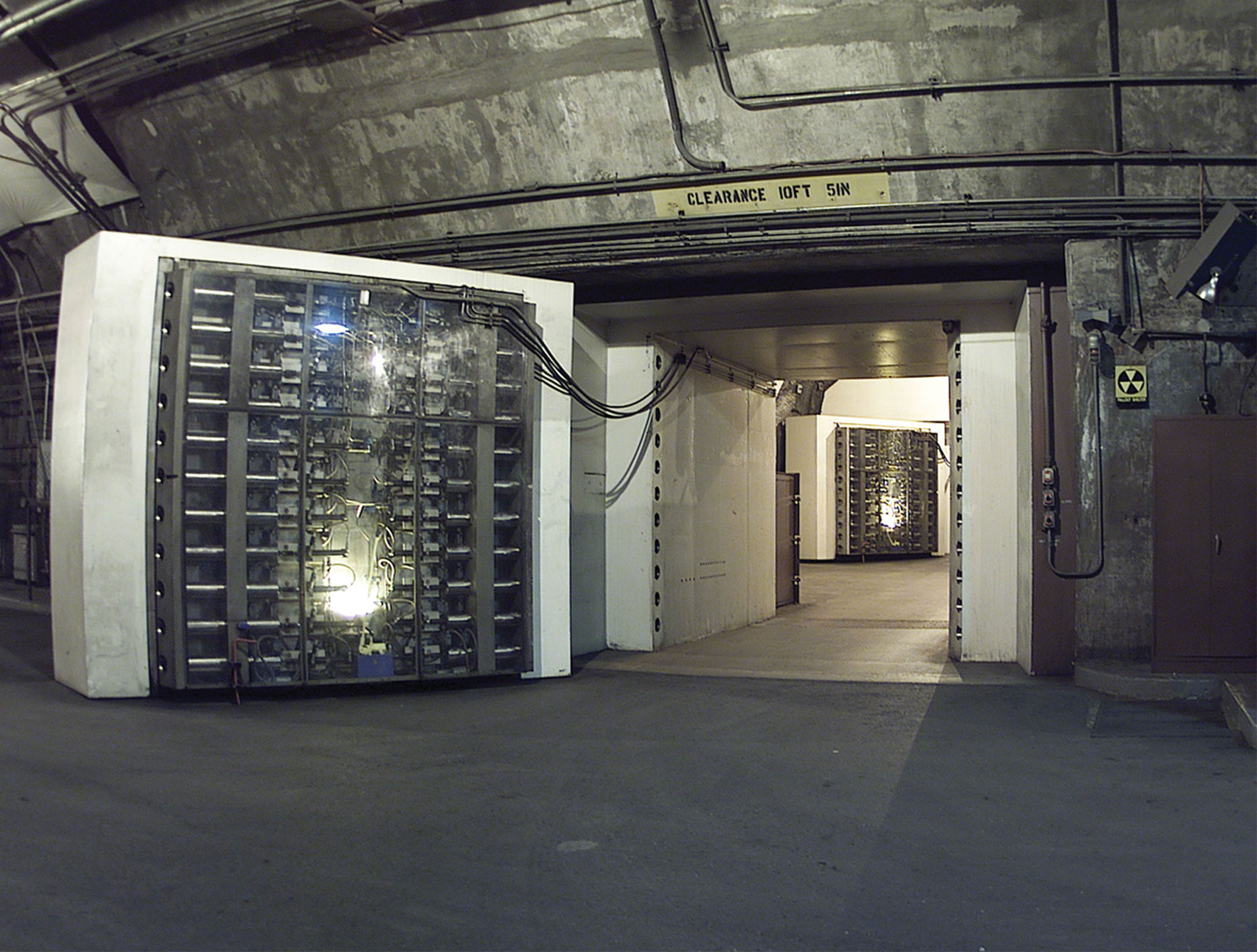
The 25-ton North blast door is the main entrance to another blast door (background) beyond which the side tunnel branches into access tunnels to the main chambers.

A large network of passages within the Complex, under 2,000 feet of gravel, can withstand a blast wave. Air Force personnel of the 210th Engineering Installation Squadron, 133rd Airlift Wing, Minnesota Air National Guard are responsible for maintaining the complex and an additional network of blast valves with unique filters that can capture airborne chemical, biological, radiological, and nuclear contaminants.

The Complex is capable of monitoring missiles, space systems, and commercial and foreign aircraft.

There is a total of fifteen three-story buildings that are protected from movement, e.g., earthquake or explosion, by a system of giant springs connected to the buildings, with flexible pipe connectors to limit the operational effect of movement. A total of more than one thousand springs are designed to prevent one of the fifteen buildings from shifting more than 1 inch. The complex is the only underground Department of Defense facility certified to be able to sustain a high-altitude electromagnetic pulse (HEMP).

=== Exterior ===
The access tunnel to the outside and leading up to the Cheyenne Mountain Space Force Station are the parking lots, a fire station operated by the 721st Civil Engineer Squadron (Note: The fire station is located at 38°44′26″N 104°50′23″W.) and outdoor recreational facilities. The recreational amenities include Mountain Man Park, picnic areas, a racquetball facility, a softball field, a sand volleyball court, a basketball court, a putting green, and a horseshoe area.

=== Support ===
The complex has its own power plant, heating and cooling system, and water supply.

In 2009, it was the 21st Mission Support Group of the 21st Space Wing which ensured that there was reliable electricity, water, air conditioning, power, and other support systems. In 2019 the 721st Mission Support Group was effectively amalgamated into the 21st MSG. With the creation of the Space Force, what was the 21st Mission Support Group is now part of Space Base Delta 1. The complex was built to manage the U.S. response to a limited or general nuclear attack. Those two least likely events are the most hazardous. However, other more likely threats include "medical emergencies, natural disasters, civil disorder, a conventional attack, an electromagnetic pulse attack, a cyber or information attack, chemical or biological or radiological attack [and an] improvised nuclear attack."

There is more water produced by mountain springs than the installation requires, and a 1.5 million-gallon (5.7 million litre) reservoir ensures that even in the event of fire, there is enough water to meet the facility's needs. A reservoir of 4.5 million gallons (17 million litres) of water is used as a heat sink. There is a reservoir for diesel fuel and a battery bank with redundant power generators. There are a large quantity of cots for most of the personnel, including suites for high-ranking military personnel of the armed forces within the bunker. Amenities include a medical facility, market, cafeteria,, and fitness centers, both inside and outside the mountain.

== In popular culture ==
=== Movies ===
- WarGames (1983) is set partly at the command center, where it was codenamed "Crystal Palace". Its commanding officer, General Jack Beringer (Barry Corbin), had the codename "Brass Hat."
- Terminator 3: Rise of the Machines (2003) ends its story inside a 1960s-era nuclear bunker complex for VIPs named "Crystal Peak," located in the Californian Sierras. Its entrance is visually identical to the eastward tunnel opening of the Cheyenne Mountain Complex.
- Interstellar (2014) has NASA's main command center within the bunker at Cheyenne Mountain.
- The Hunger Games: Mockingjay Part 2 (2015) The Nut stronghold in District 2 during the Panem Civil War is the Cheyenne Mountain Complex after the Capitol took it over.
- In the Mobile Suit Gundam Unicorn light novel series and its OVA adaptation, the Cheyenne Mountain Complex has been repurposed into an Earth Federation base codenamed the "Caucasus Forest" (or "Forest of Kavkaz" in the OVA).

=== Television ===
- In Stargate SG-1 and its spin-offs, Cheyenne Mountain houses "Stargate Command", a top-secret unit of the United States Air Force that uses the titular Stargate to explore exoplanets. In recognition of the series' close relationship with the real-life Air Force, there is now a broom closet in the real Cheyenne Mountain Complex called "Stargate Command".
- The bunker is also a setting in the series Jeremiah.

=== Video games ===
- In Wasteland 3: Cult of the Holy Detonation, Cheyenne Mountain houses a large power production facility that harvests energy from a time-dilated nuclear explosion.
- In Fallout Tactics: Brotherhood of Steel, Cheyenne Mountain is the location of Vault Zero, the final dungeon where a highly advanced organic supercomputer called the Calculator is housed.
- In Horizon: Zero Dawn, the bunker is home to a cradle facility as part of Project Zero Dawn's Eleuthia and Apollo programs; the tribe in which the protagonist is born and raised takes their name, the Nora, from a mis-reading of NORAD.

=== Online media ===
- In 2025, YouTuber MrBeast featured the Cheyenne Mountain Complex in his video "$1 vs $1,000,000,000 Nuclear Bunker!", in which he received a tour of the facility.

== See also ==
- Raven Rock Mountain Complex
- United States Space Command
- Related Colorado Springs military installations
  - Cheyenne Mountain Air Force Station
  - Peterson Air Force Base
  - Ent Air Force Base
  - Chidlaw Building
- Kosvinsky Kamen – a potential Soviet/Russian counterpart
- Mount Yamantau – a potential Soviet/Russian counterpart
