= Worldwide Military Command and Control System =

Defunct US military communication system (1971–1996)

The Worldwide Military Command and Control System, or WWMCCS /ˈwɪmɛks/, was a military command and control system implemented for the United States Department of Defense. It was created in the days following the Cuban Missile Crisis. WWMCCS was a complex of systems that encompassed the elements of warning, communications, data collection and processing, executive decision-making tools and supporting facilities. It was decommissioned in 1996 and replaced by the Global Command and Control System.

== Background ==
The worldwide deployment of U.S. forces required extensive long-range communications systems that can maintain contact with all of those forces at all times. To enable national command authorities to exercise effective command and control of their widely dispersed forces, a communications system was established to enable those authorities to disseminate their decisions to all subordinate units, under any conditions, within minutes.

Such a command and control system, WWMCCS, was created by Department of Defense Directive S-5100.30, titled "Concept of Operations of the Worldwide Military Command and Control System," which set the overall policies for the integration of the various command and control elements that were rapidly coming into being in the early 1960s.

As initially established, WWMCCS was an arrangement of personnel, equipment (including Automated Data Processing equipment and hardware), communications, facilities, and procedures employed in planning, directing, coordinating, and controlling the operational activities of U.S. military forces.

This system was intended to provide the President and the Secretary of Defense with a means to receive warning and intelligence information, assign military missions, provide direction to the unified and specified commands, and support the Joint Chiefs of Staff in carrying out their responsibilities. The directive establishing the system stressed five essential system characteristics: survivability, flexibility, compatibility, standardization, and economy.

== Problems ==
Despite the original intent, WWMCCS never realized the full potential that had been envisioned for the system. The services' approach to WWMCCS depended upon the availability of both technology and funding to meet individual requirements, so no truly integrated system emerged. Indeed, during the 1960s, WWMCCS consisted of a loosely knit federation of nearly 160 different computer systems, using 30 different general purpose software systems at 81 locations. One study claimed that WWMCCS was "more a federation of self-contained subsystems than an integrated set of capabilities."

The problems created by these diverse subsystems were apparently responsible for several well-publicized failures of command and control during the latter part of the 1960s.

During hostilities between Israel and Egypt in June 1967, the USS Liberty, a naval reconnaissance ship, was ordered by the JCS to move further away from the coastlines of the belligerents. Five high-priority messages to that effect were sent to the Liberty, but none arrived for more than 13 hours. By that time the ship had become the victim of an attack by Israeli aircraft and patrol boats that killed 34 Americans.

A congressional committee investigating this incident concluded, "The circumstances surrounding the misrouting, loss and delays of those messages constitute one of the most incredible failures of communications in the history of the Department of Defense."

Furthermore, the demands for communications security (COMSEC) frustrated upgrades and remote site computer and wiring installation. TEMPEST requirements of the Cold War day required both defense from wire tapping and electromagnetic signal intercept, special wire and cabinet shielding, physical security, double locks, and special access passes and passwords.

== Growth and development ==
The result of these various failures was a growth in the centralized management of WWMCCS, occurring at about the same time that changing technology brought in computers and electronic displays.

For example, 27 command centers were equipped with standard Honeywell 6000 computers and common programs so there could be a rapid exchange of information among the command centers.

An Assistant Secretary of Defense for Telecommunications was established, and a 1971 DOD directive gave that person the primary staff responsibility for all WWMCCS-related systems. That directive also designated the Chairman of the Joint Chiefs of Staff as the official responsible for the operation of WWMCCS.

The Worldwide Military Command and Control System (WWMCCS) Intercomputer Network (WIN) was a centrally managed information processing and exchange network consisting of large-scale computer systems at geographically separate locations, interconnected by a dedicated wide-band, packet-switched communications subsystem. The architecture of the WIN consists of WWMCCS-standard AN/FYQ-65(V) host computers and their WIN-dedicated Honeywell 6661 Datanets and Datanet 8's connected through Bolt Beranek and Newman, Inc. (BBN) C/30 and C/30E packet switching computers called Packet Switching Nodes (PSNs) and wideband, encrypted, dedicated, data communications circuits.

== Modernization ==
By the early 1980s, it was time to modernize this system. The replacement, proposed by the Deputy Secretary of Defense, was an evolutionary upgrade program known as the WWMCCS Information System [WIS], which provided a range of capabilities appropriate for the diverse needs of the WWMCCS sites.

During Operations Desert Shield and Desert Storm, WWMCCS performed flawlessly 24 hours a day, seven days a week, providing critical data to combat commanders worldwide in deploying, relocating and sustaining allied forces.

However, WWMCCS was dependent on a proprietary mainframe environment. Information cannot be easily entered or accessed by users, and the software cannot be quickly modified to accommodate changing mission requirements. Operational flexibility and adaptability are limited, since most of the information and software are stored on the mainframe. The system architecture is unresponsive, inflexible, and expensive to maintain.

This new WWMCCS Information System configuration continued to be refined until 1992 when the Assistant Secretary of Defense for Command, Control, Communications, and Intelligence terminated this latest attempt to modernize the WWMCCS ADP equipment.

The continuing need to meet established requirements which couldn't be fulfilled, coupled with a growing dissatisfaction among users with the existing WWMCCS system, drove the conceptualizing of a new system, called GCCS.

On August 30, 1996, Lieutenant General Albert J. Edmonds, Director, Defense Information Systems Agency, officially deactivated the Worldwide Military Command and Control System (WWMCCS) Intercomputer Network (WIN). Concurrently, the Joint Staff declared the Global Command and Control System (GCCS) as the joint command and control system of record.

== Computer hardware ==
=== Honeywell 6000 Series ===
The Air Force Systems Command’s Electronic Systems Division awarded a fixed-price, fixed-quantity contract to Honeywell Information Systems, Inc. for 46 million dollars on 15 October 1971. The contract included 35 Honeywell 6000 series systems, some having multiple processors. System models from the H-6060 through the H-6080 were acquired. They ran a specially secured variant of Honeywell’s General Comprehensive Operating Supervisor (GCOS), and for years the vendor maintained and enhanced both the commercial GCOS and the "WWMCCS" GCOS in parallel. Digital transmissions were secured (aka 'scrambled') using Secure Telephone Unit (STU) or Secure Telephone Element modems.

== Network ==
=== Prototype WWMCCS Network ===
The Joint Chiefs of Staff issued JCS Memorandum 593-71, "Research, Development, Test, and Evaluation Program in Support of the Worldwide Military Command and Control Standard System." in September 1971. The joint chief memorandum proposed what they called a Prototype WWMCCS Intercomputer Network (PWIN) pronounced as pee-win. The PWIN was created to test the operational benefits of networking WWMCCS. If the prototype proved successful, it would provide a baseline for an operational network. These experiments were conducted from 1971-1977.

PWIN included three sites at the Pentagon, Reston, Virginia and Norfolk, Virginia. The sites included Honeywell H6000 computers, Datanet 355 front end processors and local computer terminals for system users. Connections were provided for remote terminals using microwave, cable, satellite, or landline connections. The PWIN network was based on technology supplied by BBN Technologies, and experience gained from the ARPANET. Honeywell H716 computers, used as Interface Message Processors (IMPs) provided packet switching to network the PWIN sites together. The TELNET protocol was made available to the WWMCCS community for the first time to access remote sites.

The first comprehensive test plan for PWIN was approved on 29 October 1973. On 4 September 1974, the Joint Chiefs recommended that the prototype network be expanded from three sites to six. The recommendation was approved on 4 December 1974. The new sites included the Alternate National Military Command Center; the Military Airlift Command at Scott AFB; and the US Readiness Command headquarters at MacDill AFB.

Testing was conducted in 1976, called Experiment 1 and Experiment 2. Experiment 1, held in September took a crisis scenario borrowed from a previous exercise. Experiment 1 provided a controlled environment to test PWIN. Experiment 2 was held in October, during an exercise called Elegant Eagle 76. Experiment 2 was less controlled, so as to provide information about PWIN being able to handle user demands during a crisis. The results of the experiments were mixed.

Another test called Prime Target 77 was conducted during the spring of 1977. It added two new sites and had even more problems than Experiment 1 and Experiment 2. Ultimately, operational requirements trumped the problems and development of an operational network was recommended during 1977. The Joint Chiefs of Staff approved PWIN’s operational requirements on 18 July 1977. PWIN expanded to include a number of other WWMCCS sites and become an operational WWMCCS Intercomputer Network (WIN). Six initial WIN sites in 1977 increased to 20 sites by 1981.
