= Missile Warning Center =

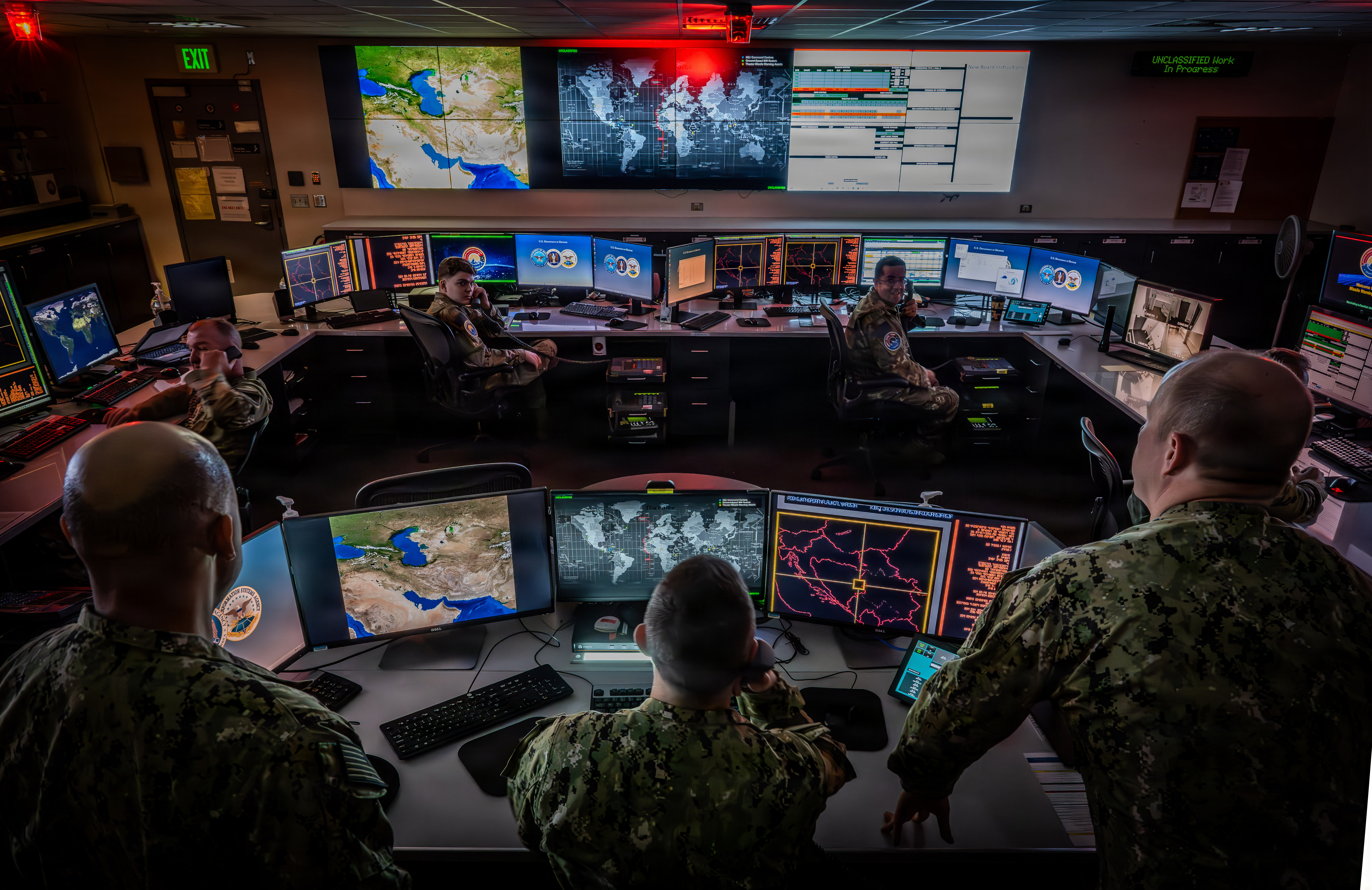
- Service members monitor computer displays inside the Missile Warning Center
- Country: United States
- Branch: United States Space Force
- Type: Missile warning center
- Role: Missile warning and defense
- Part of: United States Space Forces – Space
- Headquarters: Cheyenne Mountain Space Force Station, Colorado, U.S.
- Motto: Sentinels

Commanders
- Current commander: Capt Gregory Arnold, USN

Insignia
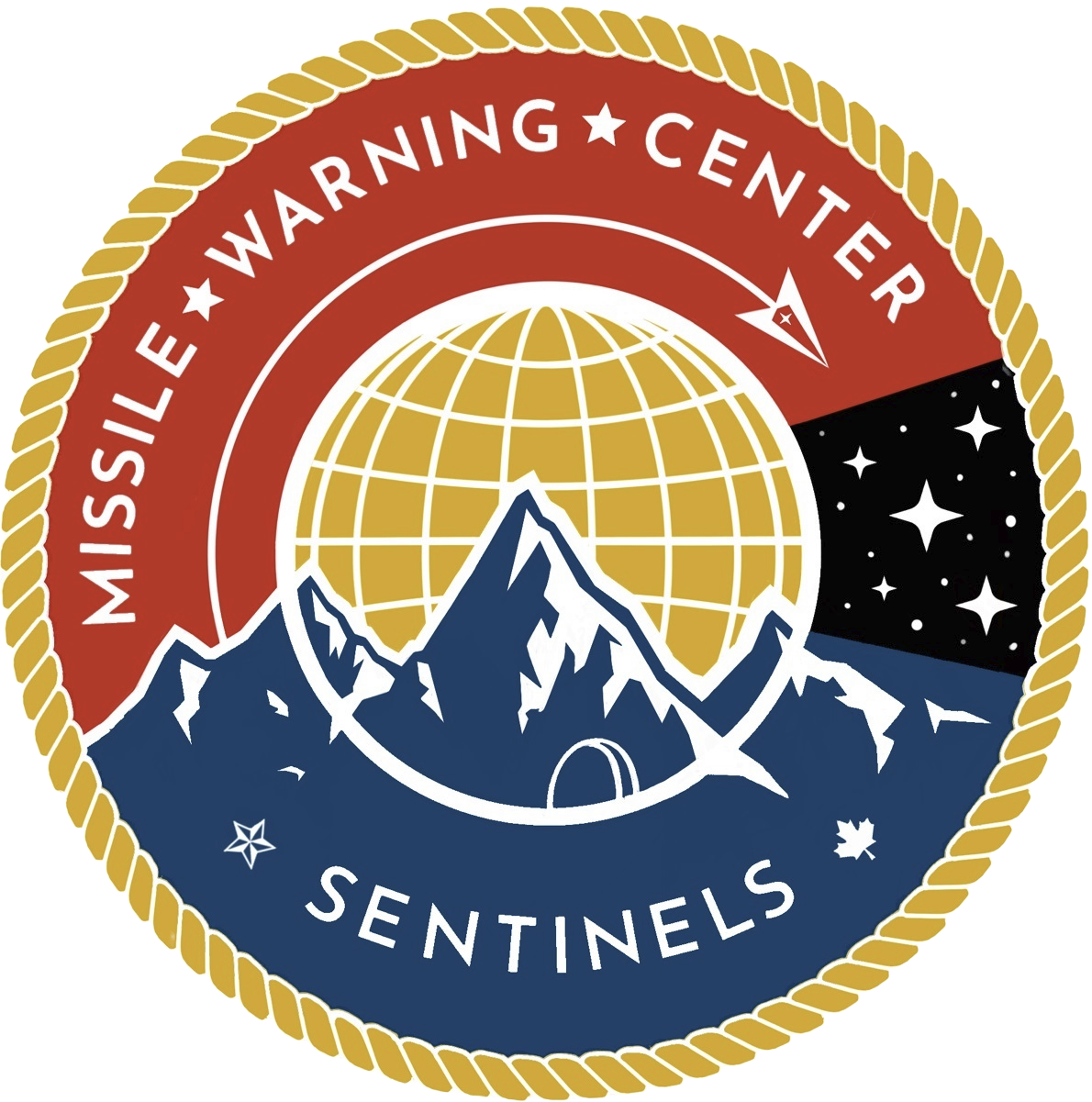
- Missile Warning Center emblem

The Missile Warning Center (MWC) is a joint operations center under United States Space Forces – Space that provides missile warning and nuclear detonation detection for United States Space Command, incorporating both space-based and terrestrial sensors. The MWC is located at Cheyenne Mountain Space Force Station.

== Mission ==
The Missile Warning Center coordinates, plans, and executes worldwide missile, nuclear detonation, and space re-entry event detection to provide timely, accurate, and unambiguous strategic warning in support of the United States and Canada.

== History ==
During deployment of the computerized air defense network for the United States, the Soviet Union announced that they had successfully tested an ICBM. BMEWS General Operational Requirement 156 was issued on November 7, 1957 (BMEWS was "designed to go with the active portion of the WIZARD system") and on February 4, 1958; the USAF informed Air Defense Command (ADC) that BMEWS was an "all-out program" and the "system has been directed by the President, has the same national priority as the ballistic missile and satellite programs and is being placed on the Department of Defense master urgency list." The subsequent plan by June 1958 for a US Zone of the Interior facility for anti-ICBM fire control by Air Defense Command (ADC) was for it to be "the heart of the entire ballistic missile defense system" with Nike Zeus SAMs. On 19 October 1959, HQ USAF assigned ADC the "planning responsibility" for eventual operation of the Missile Defense Alarm System to detect ICBM launches with infrared sensors in space.

=== 1960 Ent AFB CC&DF ===
The BMEWS Central Computer and Display Facility (CC&DF) built as an austere facility instead of the planned AICBM control center became operational on September 30, 1960, at Ent AFB when BMEWS' Thule Site J became operational. Site J's computers (e.g., in the Sylvania AN/FSQ-28 Missile Impact Predictor Set) processed 4 RCA AN/FPS-50 Radar Sets' data, and alerts transferred via the BMEWS Rearward Communications System to the CC&DF for NORAD attack assessment and warning to RCA Display Information Processors (DIPs) at the NORAD/CONAD command center (also on Ent AFB), SAC's Offutt AFB nuclear bunker, and The Pentagon's new National Military Command Center. DIPs presented impact ellipses and drove a "threat summary display" with a count of incoming missiles and a countdown of "Minutes Until First Impact" (cf. later large screen displays such as the Iconorama.) In July 1961 separate from the CC&DF, the surveillance center in New Hampshire "was discontinued as the new SPADATS Center became operational at Ent AFB" with the 496L Space Detection and Tracking System (i.e., NORAD began aerospace operations). In 1962 the Army's LIM-49 Nike Zeus program was assigned the satellite intercept mission (Program 505's "Operation Mudflap" conducted a test), and the 1962 SECDEF assigned the USAF to develop the Satellite Intercept System which would use orbit data from a Space Defense Center. By December 15, 1964, NORAD had an implementation plan for a "Single Integrated Space Defense Center" for NORAD/CONAD to centralize both missile warning and space surveillance.

=== 1967 Space Defense Center ===
The 1st Aero on February 6, 1967, moved operations to the Group III Space Defense Center, the integrated missile warning/space surveillance facility (496L Spacetrack system with Philco 212 primary processor) at the Cheyenne Mountain nuclear bunker (FOC of the new bunker's command center—a portion of the Burroughs 425L Command/Control and Missile Warning System—had been on July 1, 1966.) Interim operations of the Avco 474N SLBM Detection and Warning System began in July 1970 (IOC was 5 May 1972), and in 1972 20% of the Bendix AN/FPS-85 Phased Array Radar's surveillance capability "became dedicated to search for SLBMs" (the FPS-85 relayed SLBM data via the 474N network for SLBM warning to "SAC, the National Military Command Center, and the Alternate NMCC over BMEWS circuits").

=== 1975 NORAD/ADCOM center ===
The NORAD/CONAD Missile Warning Center came under NORAD/ADCOM control in 1975 when the unified Continental Air Defense Command ended and in early 1972, the 427M improvement program was planned; e.g., (NORAD Computer System to replace the 425L System.) After SAC assumed control of ballistic missile warning and space surveillance facilities on December 1, 1979, the MWC was in the same room as HQ NORAD/ADCOM J31's Space Surveillance Center (separated by partitions.) The "NORAD Missile Warning and Space Surveillance System" was the general term for the entire network applied by the House's 1981 Armed Services Committee—the Core Processing Segment (CPS) handled missile warning/space surveillance with three Honeywell H6080 computers, e.g., a NORAD Computer System (NCS) H6080 for command and control and for missile warning functions (2nd for space surveillance and 3rd as backup for both). Circa 1986, the "missile and space surveillance and warning system" consisted of a space computational center and 5 sensor systems:

- Ballistic Missile Early Warning System
- Defense Support Program (DSP satellites, ground systems, etc. of Project 647)
- "OTH Forward Scatter Missile Detection System" (440L System of Program 673A with international AN/FRT-80 transmitters & AN/FSQ-76 receivers, Aviano AB Correlation Center, and Rome Laboratory processing center)
- "Sea-Launched Ballistic Missile Warning System" (remaining 474N Fuzzy-7 radar(s), AN/FPS-85, and 2 PAVE PAWS stations)
- Space Detection and Warning System

By 1981 Cheyenne Mountain was providing 6,700 messages per hour compiled via sensor inputs from the Joint Surveillance System, BMEWS, the SLBM "Detection and Warning System, COBRA DANE, and PARCS as well as SEWS and PAVE PAWS". During the 1991 Gulf War, the missile operations section that supported the MWC processed SCUD missile detections and interceptions for theater warning units. The Space and Warning Systems Center maintained "26 stovepipe systems" for USSPACECOM, NORAD, and AFSPC, and the Space Computational Center was replaced in 1992.

In February 1995, "the missile warning center at Cheyenne Mountain AS [was] undergoing a $450 million upgrade program as part of Cheyenne Mountain's $1.7 billion renovation package." At Cheyenne Mountain on September 11, 2001, Major Richard J. Hughes was the Missile Warning Center Commander and the Chief of the J7 Exercise Branch. In 2003, construction began for a new command center at Cheyenne Mountain to include Ground-Based Midcourse Defense—the "new Missile Correlation Center" (MCC) was to have new consoles, mission system connectivity and communications capabilities.

=== Missile Correlation Center ===
The Missile Correlation Center (MCC) and Space Control Center were in Cheyenne Mountain by March 4, 2005 when Patrick Mullin was the commander of the MCC, which by 2006 was receiving input from five Joint Tactical Ground Stations.

=== Missile Warning Operations Center ===
The 2006–8 Cheyenne Mountain Realignment divided MCC operations into NORAD/NORTHCOM's Missile and Space Domain at Peterson AFB and STRATCOM's facility in Cheyenne Mountain ("Missile Warning Operations Center" in 2007.) USSTRATCOM announced a 2007 plan to relocate the MWOC from Cheyenne Mountain to Schriever AFB (cf. the Space Control Center which AFSPC was moving from Cheyenne Mountain to Vandenberg.) In May 2010, USSTRATCOM decided to keep its missile warning center at Cheyenne Mountain, which had begun a $2.9 million renovation in January 2010 (a temporary MWOC facility had to be set up.)

== List of directors ==
- Capt Gervy Alota
- Capt Jermaine Brooms, 28 June 2024 - 8 May 2026
- Capt Gregory Arnold, 8 May 2026 - present
