= Continental Air Defense Command =

Former US military formation

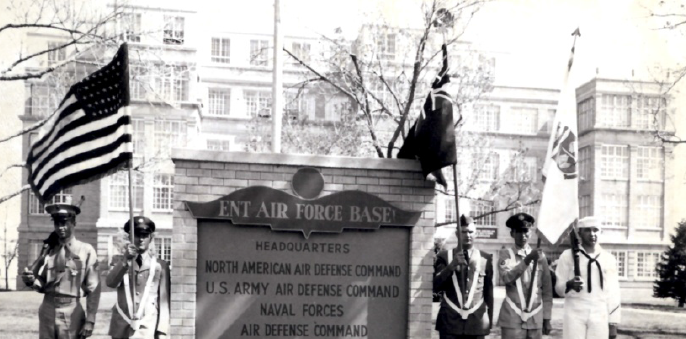
- Until 1963, CONAD HQ was located in the four-story former National Methodist Sanitorium building (background, behind sign)
- Active: September 1, 1954 – June 30, 1975
- Type: Unified Combatant Command
- Role: Air defense
- Part of: United States Department of Defense
- Garrison/HQ: Colorado Springs, CO

Continental Air Defense Command (CONAD) was a unified combatant command of the United States Department of Defense, tasked with air defense for the continental United States. It comprised Army, Air Force, and Navy components. The primary purpose of continental air defense during the CONAD period was to spot incoming Soviet bomber air raids in time to allow Strategic Air Command to launch a counterattack. It also controlled weapons to shoot down such bombers.

Among the weapons that CONAD controlled were Army Project Nike anti-aircraft missiles (Ajax and Hercules) and USAF interceptors (crewed aircraft and BOMARC missiles). Some CIM-10B BOMARC missiles were armed with the 10-kiloton W-40 nuclear warhead.

The command was disestablished in 1975, and Aerospace Defense Command became the major U.S. component of North American Air Defense Command (NORAD).

== Background ==
Discussion of a joint command for air defense began as the U.S. Air Force was being established in 1947. After the USAF began to develop the "1954 interceptor" to counter expected Soviet bomber advances, the Army deployed M-33 Fire Control for AA artillery in 1950. In 1950, a proposal for a joint/unified command for air defense was rejected. In mid-July, the Air Force installed a direct telephone line its Continental Air Command headquarters and 26th Air Division HQ at Roslyn Air Warning Station. This marked "the beginning of the Air Force air raid warning system." When the Korean War broke out, the USAF established a direct telephone line between the Air Force Command Post in the Pentagon and the White House.

The following year, the Air Force created Air Defense Command (ADC) at Ent AFB, while Army Antiaircraft Command (ARAACOM) was staffed in the nearby Antlers Hotel (Colorado) and the Priority Permanent System began replacing the post-war Lashup Radar Network.

By 1953, North American air defenses involved assets of five organizations:

- ADC's "SAGE radar stations, fighter interceptor squadrons, and the Air Defense Direction Center"
- Army Antiaircraft Command (ARAACOM)'s AAA artillery, MIM-3 Nike Ajax surface-to-air missiles, and the network of fire control centers and target acquisition radars
- Alaskan Air Command (AAC) with interceptors and radars at North America's northwest
- Northeast Air Command (NEAC) of the USAF in northeast Canada and Thule Air Force Base, Greenland
- Air Defence Command of the Royal Canadian Air Force with its interceptor aircraft and radars

=== Debate over operational control ===
The United States Department of Defense agreed that the USAF would assume operational control of all U.S. air defense weapons during an attack. However, the Army complained the USAF command and control network (e.g., the 1950 Strategic Operational Control System (SOCS) telephone/teletype system was "insufficiently reliable." In response to the "enemy capabilities to inflict massive damage on the continental United States by surprise air attack", the National Security Council formulated President Dwight Eisenhower's "The New Look" strategy in 1953–1954. To minimize the Soviet threat, the New Look strategy aimed to allow Strategic Air Command (SAC) bombers "to get into the air not be destroyed on the ground" to make massive retaliation possible. Thus the major purpose of air defense was not actually to shoot down enemy bombers, but merely gain time for SAC to respond.

== Planning ==
By October 16, 1953, the Chairman of the Joint Chiefs of Staff requested the services' input regarding formation of a joint air defense command, but the USAF Chief of Staff on December 16, 1953 "concluded that no change was needed or advisable". Under "political pressures for greater unity and effectiveness in the national air defense system", the Chairman of the Joint Chiefs, Navy Admiral Radford, disagreed with the USAF. Admiral Radford "recommended that the JCS approve in principle the establishment of a joint air defense command" in January 1954:

In an era when enemy capabilities to inflict massive damage on the continental United States by surprise air attack are rapidly increasing, I consider that there is no doubt whatsoever as to the duty of the Joint Chiefs to establish a suitable "joint" command…. The command will be composed of forces of each of the services and provide for the coordinated accomplishment of functions of each of the services for the air defense of the United States.

The command was planned to include:

- all air forces regularly assigned to the air defense of the United States
- land based early warning stations and sea-based forces assigned to contiguous radar coverage;
- antiaircraft forces of the Army involved in the permanent air defense of the United States
- the exercise of operational control of Army and Marine Corps units "which can temporarily augment the air defense forces in event of emergency."
- CINCLANT/CINCPAC and CINCAL/CINCNE responses as needed from their "seaward extensions of the early warning system…and early warning installations in Alaska and the NE Command".

== Operational control ==
The Joint Chiefs directed the establishment of CONAD on August 2, 1954. It was to integrate the three military departments' air defense capabilities "..into an air defense system responsible to the control of one military commander."

CONAD was established effective September 1, 1954, primarily to defend the continental United States against air attack. It was also tasked to support U.S. commanders in the Pacific, Atlantic, Caribbean, Alaska, Northeast, and of Strategic Air Command in their missions to the maximum extent consistent with its primary mission. ADC's commander, General Benjamin Chidlaw, became the first CINCONAD, and the USAF was designated as the executive agency. From 1954 to 1956, CONAD consisted of the USAF Air Defense Command, Army Antiaircraft Command, and the Naval Forces, Continental Air Defense Command (NAVFORCONAD). The USAF ADC Headquarters was additionally designated as Headquarters CONAD.

CONAD's operational control covered:

1. Direction of the tactical air battle
2. Control of fighters
3. Specifying the alert condition
4. Stationing early warning units
5. Deploying combat units of the command.

ADC's main battle control center was moved out of the former hallway/latrine in the Ent AFB headquarters building and into a new-built blockhouse in 1954. At Ent, offices for both HQ CONAD and a new HQ NAVFORCONAD were prepared in the building with the ADC and ARAACOM HQs. NAVFORCONAD was placed under command of Rear Admiral Albert K. Morehouse.

The Experimental SAGE Subsector received the prototype IBM AN/FSQ-7 Combat Direction Central computer in July 1955. for development of a "national air defense network", A late 1955 CONAD plan for USAF Semi-Automatic Ground Environment control of Army Nike missiles caused an interservice dispute but later in 1956 the Secretary of Defense approved CONAD's plan for USAF units at computerized Army nuclear bunkers. The 1959 Missile Master Plan resolved the dispute to have separate Nike Hercules missile command posts in the bunkers. On February 13, 1956, CINCONAD advocated "an eventual combined organization…of the Air Defense Force of all countries and services in and adjacent to North America." December 1956 planning requested "six prime and 41 gap-tiller radars [to be] located in Mexico. By 1956, CONAD had designated 3 "SAC Base Complexes" to be defended: in the Northwestern United States, in a Montana-through-North Dakota area, and the largest in a nearly-triangular "South Central Area" from Minnesota to New Mexico to Northern Florida.

=== 1956 reorganization ===
On September 4, 1956, the JCS changed the Terms of Reference for CONAD to be "more in line [with] ..a joint task force" and separated command of the USAF Air Defense Command from CINCONAD. The CONAD staff were separated from the ADC HQ staff on October 1, 1956. The JCS also transferred "the air defense systems in Alaska and the Canadian Northeast" from those unified commands to CONAD. On January 1, 1957, CINCONAD placed the U.S. defenses in a geometric "Canadian Northeast Area" under the operational control of the Canadian Air Defence Command.

In March 1957, CONAD said "that an adequate and timely defense system against the intercontinental ballistic missile was "the most urgent future CONAD requirement." CONAD identified a requirement "for a defense against cruise and ballistic missiles launched from submarines or surface ships" on June 14, 1957 The 1957 Gaither Report identified "little likelihood of SAC's bombers surviving since there was no way to detect an incoming attack until the first [ICBM] warhead landed". In keeping with these recommendations, the BMEWS General Operational Requirement was issued on November 7, 1957.

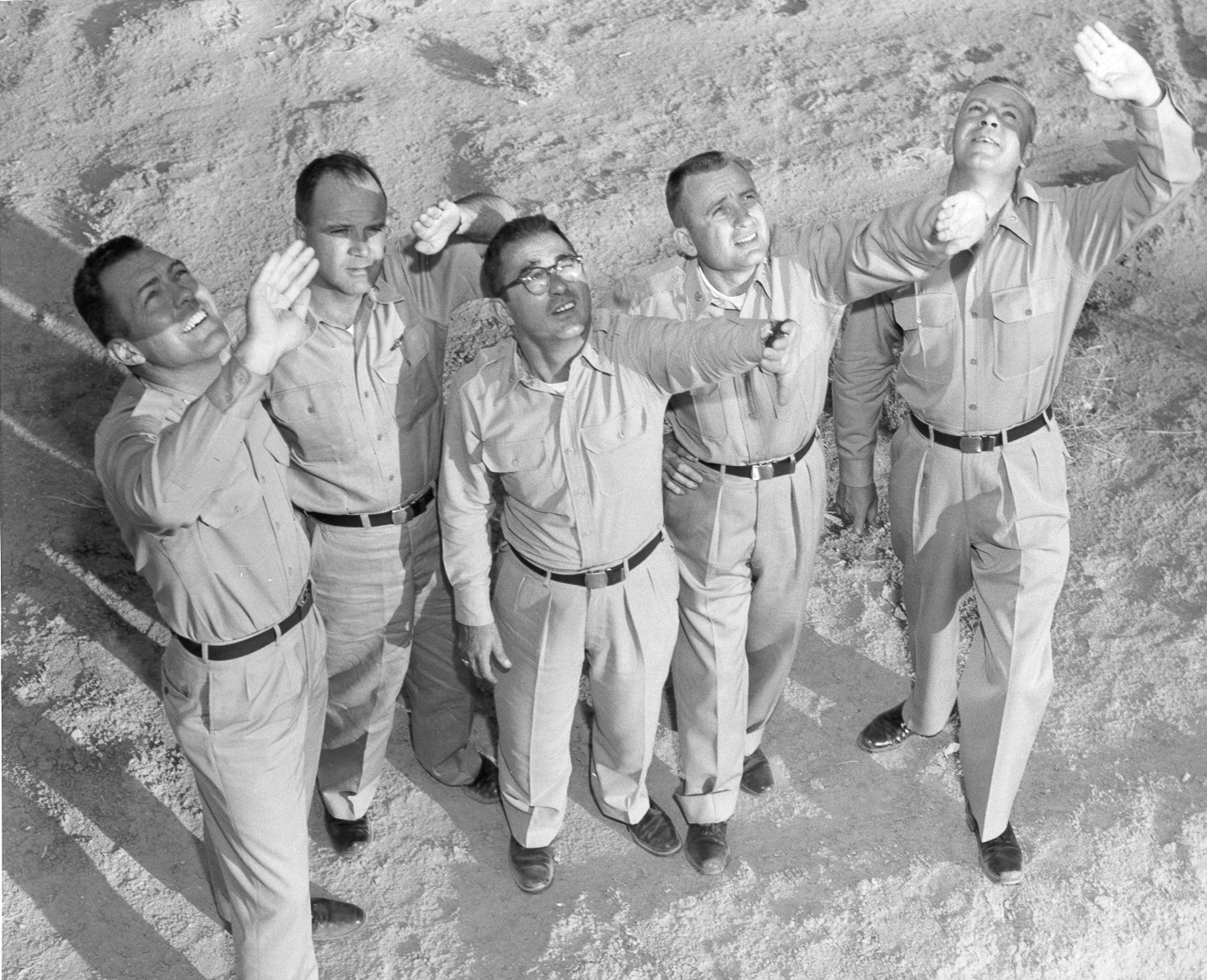
Five USAF officers from CONAD standing under the detonation of a 2-kiloton AIR-2 Genie air-to-air rocket (Operation Plumbbob, shot John, 1957)

On 6 September 1957, CONAD advised all appropriate agencies that the North American Air Defense Command (NORAD) was to be established at Ent Air Force Base effective 0001 Zulu 12 September. This would integrate the headquarters of CONAD and RCAF ADC. General Earle E. Partridge, the CONAD/ADC commander, became Commander-in-Chief of NORAD. At the same time, Canadian officers agreed that the command's primary purpose would be "early warning and defense for SAC's retaliatory forces."

Ground zero footage for CONAD was shot during the Operation Plowshare nuclear detonation. When the ICBM threat had sufficiently developed, the June 1959 Continental Air Defense Program reduced the number of Super Combat Centers to 7, then all were cancelled on March 18, 1960. The Canadian nuclear bunker started at RCAF Station North Bay was completed in 1963 with vacuum tube computers.

=== Space defense ===
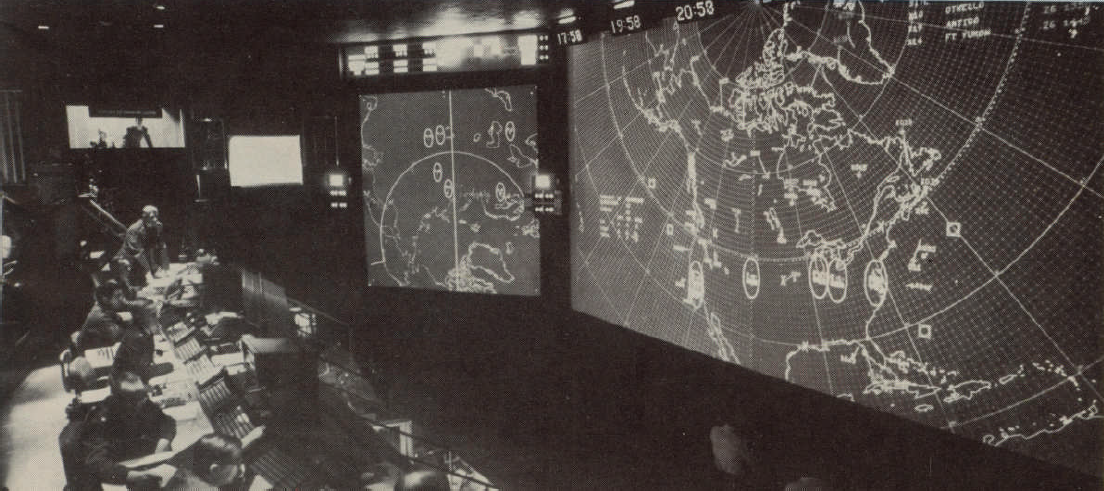
The NORAD/CONAD Combined Operations Center at the Chidlaw Building in Colorado Springs.

CONAD was assigned "operational command" of the Space Detection and Tracking System (SPADATS) on November 7, 1960. SPADATS included Project Space Track and NAVSPASUR sensors. The "Improved Hercules system" for surface-to-air-missiles was first deployed in 1961, and in 1962 the command staffed the alternate US command post (CONAD ALCOP) at Richards-Gebaur AFB. CONAD HQ moved from Ent AFB to the nearby Colorado Springs' Chidlaw Building in 1963, where a new NORAD/CONAD "war room" (Combined Operations Center) with Iconorama was used until the under-construction Command Center and Missile Warning Center became operational at Cheyenne Mountain Complex in 1966. NORAD HQ moved to the Chidlaw Building on February 15, 1963. The CONAD and NORAD offices were consolidated on March 7, 1963.

CONAD agreed to allow the FAA to control military aircraft for "scramble, flight en route to target [enemy aircraft], and recovery" (handed off to military directors for actual intercept) effective February 1, 1964. By January 12, 1965, CONAD had a "Space Defense Center Implementation Plan" (in 1967 the 1st Aero moved Ent's Space Defense Center operations to Cheyenne Mountain Complex's Group III Space Defense Center.) CONAD continued using the same name with "air defense" after Aerospace Defense Command (ADCOM) was designated the new USAF "space" command name in 1968 with most of CONAD's missile warning and space surveillance assets (cf. the 1959 Naval Space Surveillance System until transferred to the USAF in 2004).

=== Contiguous Radar Coverage System ===
Established in 1954 to provide both early warning of enemy bombers and a weapons control capability, the Contiguous Radar Coverage System consisted of land-based radars across the width of southern Canada (the "Pinetree Line") and radar ships in the Atlantic and Pacific oceans (the "Seaward Extensions"). As of 1961, the system could detect enemy bombers out to about 400 to 500 miles, yielding a warning of about 45 to 55 minutes. The Seaward Extensions also included airborne early warning aircraft and two Texas Tower radars off the northeastern coast of the United States.

== Aftermath ==
External image
- 1956 & two 1954 organizational charts

BOMARC alerts ended in 1972, and the post-Vietnam war drawdown closed most CONUS NIKE missile sites during the 1974 Project Concise. At the very end of the command's existence, the SAFEGUARD ABM system was being deployed. It became operational on October 1, 1975.

CONAD was disestablished on June 30, 1975. General Lucius D. Clay Jr., the last commander, remained Commander-in-Chief of NORAD, and Aerospace Defense Command personnel staffed the combined NORAD/ADCOM organization. ADCOM was broken up 1979-80 with interceptors transferring to Air Defense, Tactical Air Command, missile warning stations transferring to SAC (e.g., the new PAVE PAWS sites), electronics units transferring to the Air Force Communications Service (AFCS), and the NORAD/ADCOM "Air Force Element" forming the new Aerospace Defense Center.

Remaining ADCOM HQ functions continued as combined NORAD/ADCOM organizations, e.g., "HQ NORAD/ADCOM" J31 subsequently staffed the Cheyenne Mountain Space Surveillance Center in the same room as the Missile Warning Center, separated by partitions. In 1982, the Aerospace Defense Center was incorporated into the new Air Force Space Command.
