= Space track =

Space Track may refer to various facilities and systems for Project Space Track and other space surveillance operations (in chronological order):

- Project Space Track at the Air Force Cambridge Research Center (CRC) in the late 1950s
- National Space Surveillance Control Center, a Hanscom Field facility dedicated February 9, 1960, that replaced the CRC directorate's operations
- Space Detection and Tracking System (SPADATS), USAF computer system 496L at Ent AFB that superseded the NSSCC in July 1961
  - SPACETRACK Operations Center, the facility renamed from the former SPADAT Operations Center at the end of 1962.
- Space Defense Center, the Ent AFB and October 1966 Cheyenne Mountain facility for detection and tracking
- Space Defense Operations Center (SPADOC), a facility established at the Cheyenne Mountain nuclear bunker in 1979
- United States Space Surveillance Network, the network feeding data to the current center
- Joint Space Operations Center, at Vandenberg AFB
