= Benjamin W. Chidlaw =

United States Air Force general

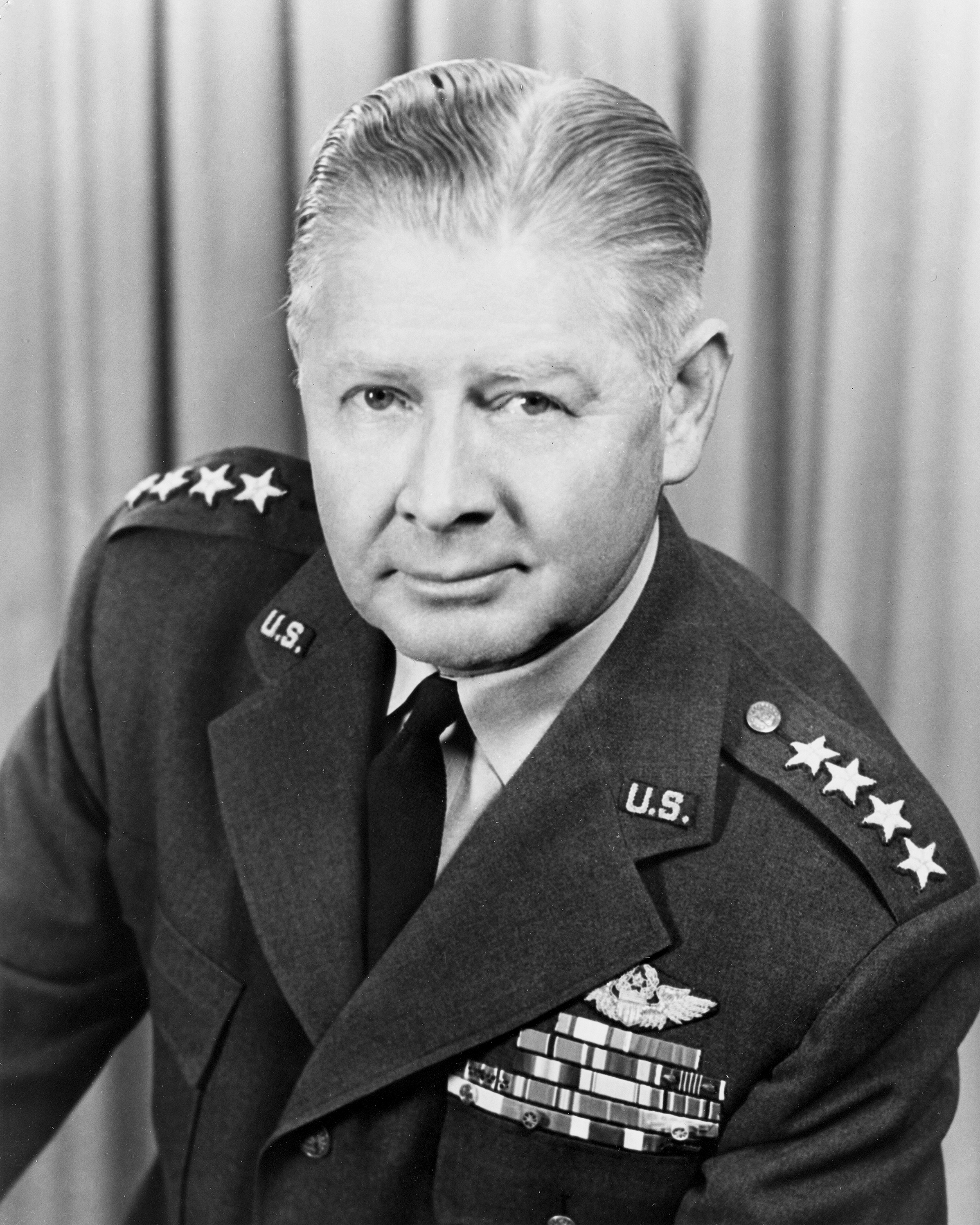
- Born: December 18, 1900; Cleves, Ohio
- Died: February 21, 1977 (aged 76); Colorado Springs, Colorado
- Military career
- Allegiance: United States
- Branch: United States Army Air Service (1922–26); United States Army Air Corps (1926–42); United States Army Air Force (1942–47); United States Air Force (1947–55)
- Service years: 1922–1955
- Rank: General
- Commands: Continental Air Defense Command; Air Defense Command; Air Materiel Command; Mediterranean Allied Tactical Air Force; XXII Tactical Air Command
- Conflicts: World War II
- Awards: Distinguished Service Medal (2); Legion of Merit; Bronze Star Medal; Air Medal

General Benjamin Wiley Chidlaw (December 18, 1900 – February 21, 1977) was an officer in the United States Air Force. He directed the development of the United States' original jet engine and jet aircraft. He joined the United States Army Air Service, at the time a precursor to the United States Air Force (USAF), in 1922 and for several years served in training and engineering positions. By 1940 he was chief of the Experimental Engineering Branch and involved with the development of jet engines. During World War II he was deputy commander of 12th Tactical Air Command and later organised the establishment of the 22nd Tactical Air Command in the European Theater of Operations. After the war he remained in senior command positions and finished his career with the USAF in 1955 as commander in chief of the Continental Air Defense Command with the rank of general. He died in 1977 at the age of 76.

== Early life ==
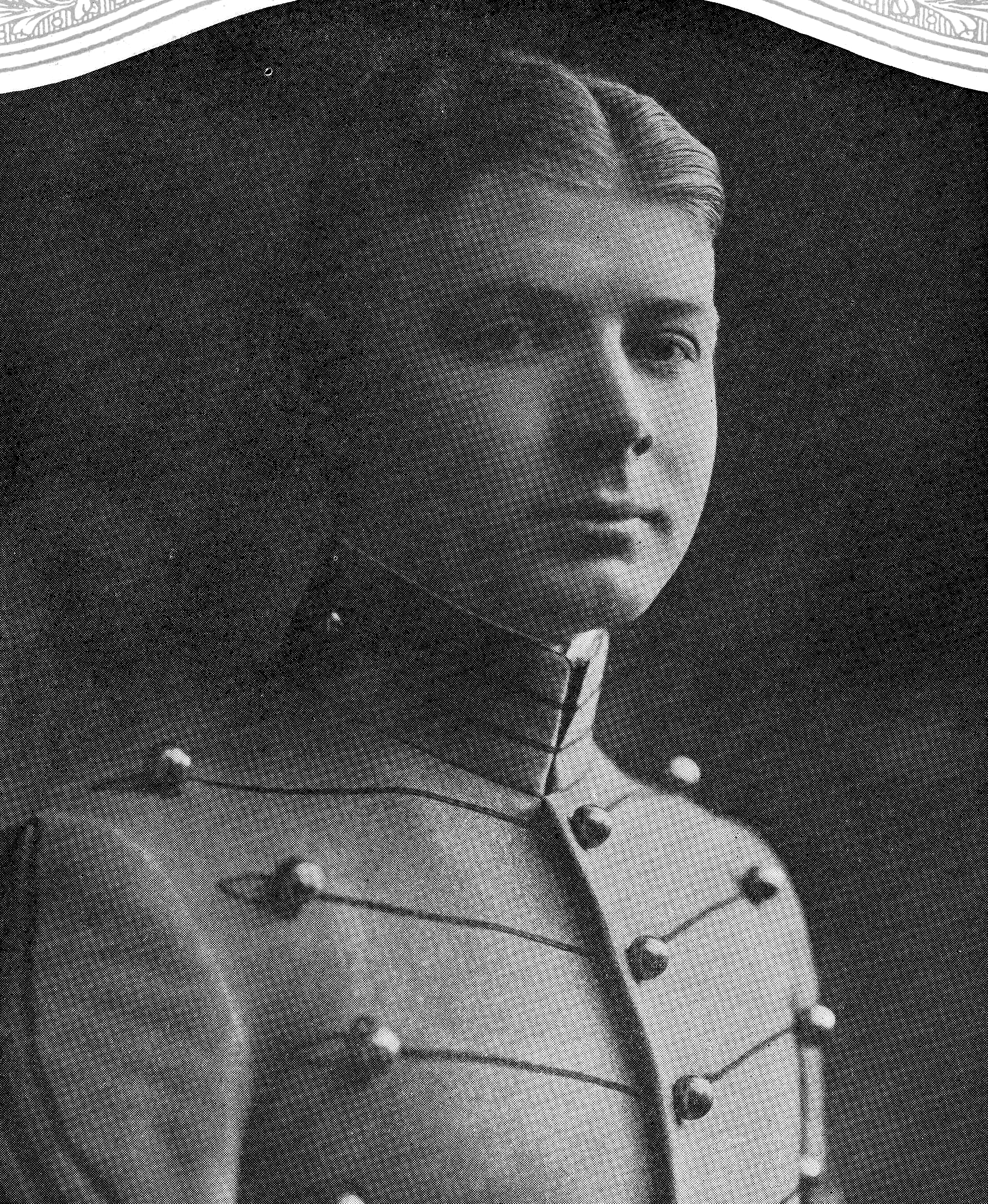
At West Point in 1922

Benjamin Wiley Chidlaw was born in Cleves, Ohio, on December 18, 1900. He graduated from Woodward High School at Cleves and from the United States Military Academy, with appointment in June 1922 as a second lieutenant of the United States Army Air Service, soon to become the United States Army Air Corps (USAAC), which would later evolve into the United States Air Force (USAF).

== Military career ==
Chidlaw took flying training at Brooks and Kelly Fields, Texas, and got his wings in January 1924. He remained at Kelly five months as a flying instructor. He went to Clark Field in the Philippines for duty with the 3rd Pursuit Squadron. He returned to Brooks in October 1926 as flying instructor assistant staging commander, and final check pilot.

Promoted to first lieutenant in April 1927, Chidlaw remained at Brooks until July 1930 when he entered the USAAC Engineering School at Wright Field, Ohio, graduating a year later. Then began the first of several long assignments at Wright Field which established Chidlaw as an expert on materiel, especially aircraft. He stayed five years this time, chiefly as project officer of the Materiel Division's Training and Transport Aircraft Branch.

Early in 1934 he devoted three months to helping the USAAC inaugurate its flying of the airmail. In succession he took the Air Corps Tactical School course at Maxwell Field, Alabama, and the Command and General Staff School instruction at Fort Leavenworth, Kansas. He was promoted to captain in August 1935 and assigned to the 2nd Bomb Group at Langley Field, Virginia, where he became Operations Officer in May 1938. The following January he was named technical assistant to the assistant chief of staff for materiel at the USAAC Headquarters at Langley. He went back to Wright Field for a short time and in March 1939 was assigned to the Supply Division in the Office of the Chief of Air Corps. Three months later he became chief of the Engineer Section and in October chief of the Experimental Engineering Branch, where he monitored the jet engine development.

=== World War II ===
Chidlaw was promoted to major in March 1940, to lieutenant colonel in September 1941, to colonel in March 1942, and to brigadier general in November 1942, while assigned to this duty in Washington. In March 1943, he was assigned to the Office of the Assistant Chief of Air Staff for Materiel in Washington. In that capacity he represented the United States Army Air Force (USAAF), the direct predecessor to the United States Air Force, on several joint Royal Air Force-USAAF technical missions in London. He went to the Mediterranean Theater in April 1944 as deputy commanding general of the XII Tactical Air Command. Following the invasion of southern France, he organized and commanded the XXII Tactical Air Command in that theater. In March 1945 he took command of the Mediterranean Allied Tactical Air Force and was promoted to major general the next month.

== Later life ==
Chidlaw returned to Wright Field in July 1945 as deputy commanding general for operations of what became Air Materiel Command. In October 1947, he became deputy commanding general of the command, with rank of lieutenant general, and full commander September 1, 1949. On October 29, 1951, he received his fourth star and the command of Air Defense Command at Ent Air Force Base, Colorado. He also became commander in chief of the joint service Continental Air Defense Command there on September 1, 1954. He retired from the USAF in that capacity on May 31, 1955, with many decorations from his own country as well as France, Great Britain, Poland and Brazil.

Chidlaw died at his home in Colorado Springs, Colorado on February 21, 1977. He was interred at the United States Air Force Academy Cemetery three days later.

== Legacy ==
The Chidlaw Building in Colorado Springs, Colorado and Chidlaw Road in Dayton, Ohio are named in honor of Benjamin Chidlaw.
