= Federal Building (Colorado Springs, Colorado) =

Former United States Federal Building

Federal Building, Ent and Peterson Air Force Bases
- Part of Air Defense Command (ADC)
- 1520 E. Willamette, Colorado Springs, Colorado
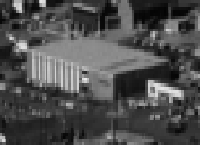
- Federal Building, Ent Air Force Base, 1962

Site information
- Type: Computer systems, Air Force Base
- Controlled by: United States Air Force

Location
- Coordinates: 38°50′32″N 104°47′51″W

Site history
- Built: 1962 for Burroughs Corporation
- Built by: Davis-Becker Construction Company; Smartt Construction Co. - Gen. Contractor; C. Dewey King - architect

The Ent Air Force Base (Blue) was one of several early Cold War military sites in the Colorado Springs area. It was 47 acres (19 ha).

The Federal Building, originally the Burroughs Building, was a Cold War military computer systems building on the Ent Air Force Base in Colorado Springs. It was built in 1962 to be used by Burroughs Corporation for its project to build an automated facility to take input, like satellite and radar information, and instantaneously assess its degree of combat importance. The program was designed in conjunction with Air Force 425L System Project engineers and was an important component in North American Aerospace Defense Command (NORAD)'s command and control system. It was an Ent Air Force Base building until 1975 when the base was inactivated. It then became an off-base installation to the Peterson Air Force Base. Over the next several decades there were varying uses for the building by the federal government. After 2007, the building was vacated and in 2009 it was sold.

== Ent Air Force Base ==
Burroughs Corporation was awarded a contract to develop a North American Aerospace Defense Command (NORAD) command and control system for its Combat Operations Center. The construction project, to be completed in 1964, included construction at the underground (Cheyenne Mountain Air Force Station) facility and two other phases of the project. The system, designed in conjunction with Air Force 425L Systems Project engineers at Burrough's high speed computer complex in Massachusetts, was to be "an automated facility for centralizing the evaluation of critical aerospace surveillance points, providing computations in one-millionth of a second." Its sources of information included radar and satellites.

The 44,000 square feet (4,100 m^{2}) or 50,000 square feet (4,600 m^{2}) two-story Burroughs Building was constructed in 1962 on 1.7 acres for the Burroughs Corporation, as designed by C. Dewey King. The building included offices and laboratories for NORAD's electronics and communications systems. It was owned by Davis-Becker Construction company, who then leased it to Burroughs.

In 1970, a Museum of Heritage collection was built for the Fourteenth Aerospace Force in Ent Air Force Base's Burroughs Building. The collection consisted of items from personnel who served with the Flying Tigers or its forerunner the American Volunteer Group in China. The displays—including Chinese coins, patches, flying jackets, and flags—were to be completed September 1970.

The Army Air Defense Command, part of North American Air Defense Command and Continental Air Command, was inactivated at Ent AFB on January 4, 1975. The Fourteenth Aerospace Force at Ent Air Force Base was inactivated and its personnel and units were reassigned to Air Defense Command on October 1, 1976. Ent Air Force Base was declared excess. In December 1976, personnel were moved to Peterson Air Force Base and the Chidlaw Building, near downtown Colorado Springs.

== Peterson Air Force Base ==
In 1975, the Ent Air Force Base and the NORAD headquarters moved to the Peterson Air Force Base Ent Building. Until February 28, 1975, Peterson Field was an off-base installation of Ent Air Force Base; the commander of Ent oversaw Peterson Field. On March 1, 1975, Peterson Air Force Base became a primary installation and assumed Aerospace Defense Command functions that had been performed by Ent Air Force Base, which became Ent Annex, an off-base installation of Peterson Air Force Base. In 1975, the data processing building was completed. The Federal Building was an off-base facility of Peterson Air Force Base.

In 1993, Kaman Sciences Corporation was awarded a contract to maintain communications mission firmware and software at the Federal Building, Peterson Air Force Base, and Cheyenne Mountain Air Force Base. The Federal Building was included in Peterson Air Force Base's Economic Impact Analysis in 2009.

== General Services Administration ==
By 1998, the building was owned by the United States General Services Administration and leased to the Air Force Space Command.

Bayshore Industries was awarded a contract by the U.S. General Services Administration to maintain and operate the Federal Building in 2006. The building was fully occupied until October 2006 by the Space Command.

The United States Armed Forces occupied approximately 15% of the building until June 2007. United States Northern Command hosted a Coalition Warrior Interoperability Demonstration, an annual event, on June 18, 2007 at the Federal Building. It was a media event to present emerging technologies of command, control, communications, computers, intelligence, surveillance, and reconnaissance solutions (C4ISR) for military and homeland security applications. It was also a venue for Department of Defense, local and federal law enforcement, emergency personnel, and partner systems. The purpose of the event included evaluation of interoperability within the coalition and international community, such as North Atlantic Treaty Organization (NATO) members, Canada, and the United Kingdom. A simulated hostage demonstration was held at the building.

The Federal Protective Services and General Services Administration occupied a small portion of the building until their leases expired at the end of September 2007. A bill was introduced in 2007 by Senator Allard and under consideration to transfer the building to the United States Paralympics, Incorporated, a subsidiary of the United States Olympic Committee. The GSA sold the building, which had been vacant since 2007, in 2009 for $890,000 through its online auction.
