= 1st Space Operations Squadron =

U.S. Space Force unit

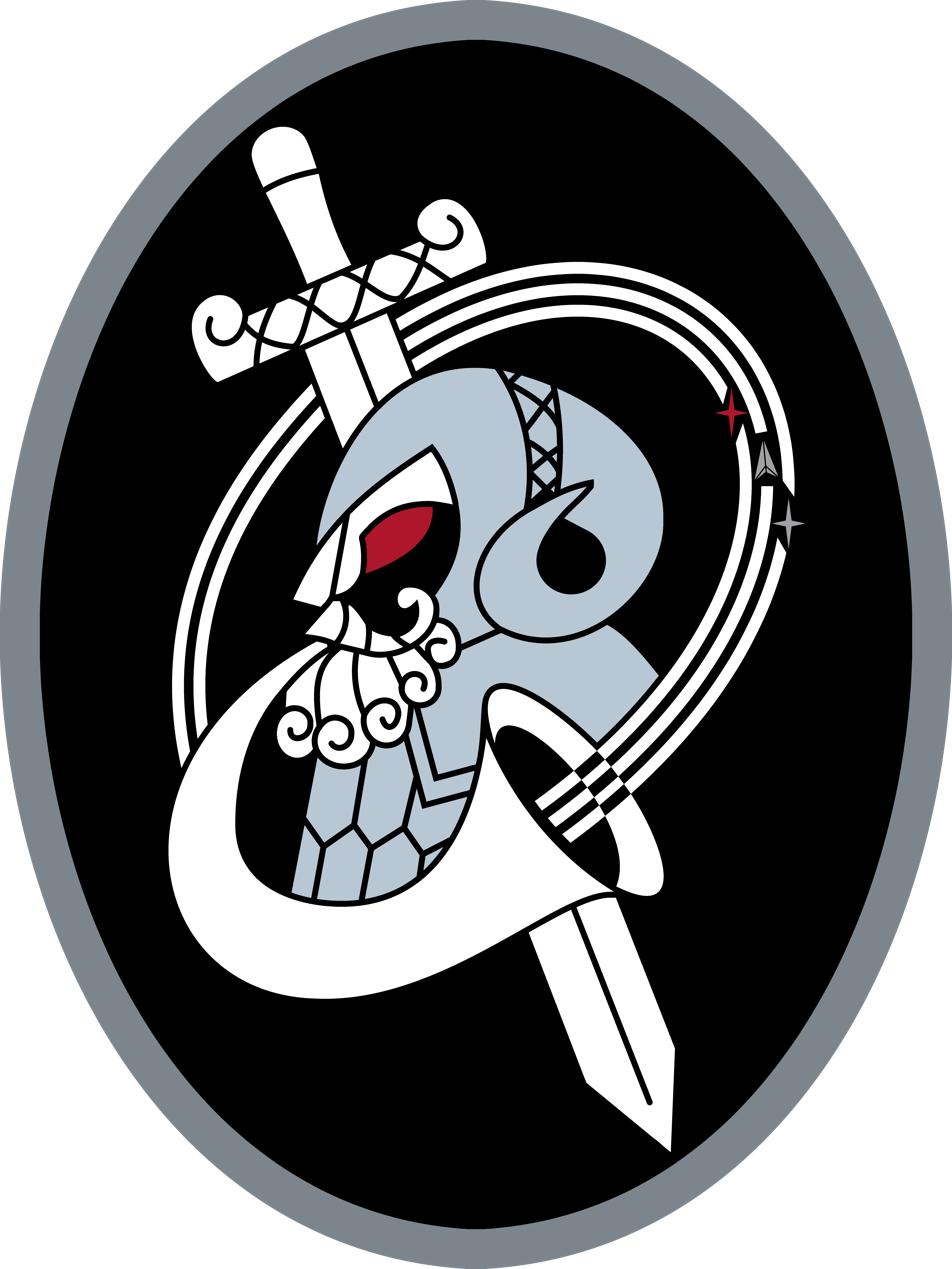
- 1 SOPS emblem
- Active: 1961–1976; 1987–present
- Country: United States
- Branch: United States Space Force
- Role: On-orbit Command and Control
- Part of: Space Delta 9
- Garrison/HQ: Schriever Space Force Base, Colorado, U.S.
- Mottos: Always in Control (1993-present); Latin: Primarii Aetheris Defensores (1962-1976), lit. 'Space Defenders of the First Rank'
- Decorations: Air Force Outstanding Unit Award

Commanders
- Commander: Lt Col Russell Smith

The 1st Space Operations Squadron (1 SOPS) is a United States Space Force unit responsible for space-based space domain awareness. Located at Schriever Space Force Base, Colorado, the squadron operates the Space Based Space Surveillance system, the Advanced Technology Risk Reduction system, the Operationally Responsive Space-5 satellite, and the Geosynchronous Space Situational Awareness Program.

It was first activated in 1961 as the 1st Aerospace Surveillance and Control Squadron as the SPACETRACK component of NORAD's Space Detection and Tracking System. It was the operational version of Project Space Track. It continued this mission as the 1st Aerospace Control Squadron until inactivation in 1976. It depends on Space Delta 9 when this unit is created on 24 July 2020.

== Mission ==
The squadron conducts command and control for four distinct constellations: Defense Support Program (DSP), Midcourse Space Experiment (MSX) and a NASA research and development program, in low earth to deep space orbits, and is Air Force Space Command's only multi-mission Satellite Operations Control Center. 1 SOPS is supported by the Air Force Reserves unit, the 7th Space Operations Squadron.

The squadron operates and maintains 24-hour Air Force Satellite Control Network command and control capability for Defense Support Program and Midcourse Space Experiment constellations. It also operates and maintains a research and development space system providing vital space weather data worldwide.

The 1st Squadron performs launch and early-orbit operations for GPS and DSP systems including satellite activation, initial checkout and transfer to mission orbit. It plans and executes tracking, telemetry and command functions for GPS, DSP, MXS and a NASA research and development satellite to maintain spacecraft state-of-health, sustain on-orbit operations and accomplish mission taskings. They respond to all satellite emergencies, and support end-of-life testing and disposal operations for GPS, DSP and MSX and NASA research and development spacecraft as required.

The squadron maintains DSP spacecraft positional knowledge and distributes data to worldwide users. It also conducts MSX and NASA research and development training and evaluation.

The Multi-Mission Space Operations Center (MMSOC) is a revolutionary approach to space operations—an operations center focused on forging a one-of-a-kind operations/acquisition team to demonstrate and field emerging space missions and satellite C2 technologies in a rapid, decisive manner. The MMSOC is structured to operate a variety of satellite missions, including satellite initiatives without a program office, satellite missions of small scale (small constellations), new missions transitioning from concept toward full-scale operations, and all research, development, test and evaluation satellites with operational utility remaining after test and evaluation are complete.

Mission control crew shifts conduct 24-hour operations supporting the three major functions of satellite control; telemetry, tracking and commanding. Orbital analysts and program engineers provide program specific knowledge and support to the crews. The operators perform pre-contact planning, real time contact and post-contact evaluation. The squadron conducts more than 2,000 contacts a month.

== History ==
=== Space Track ===
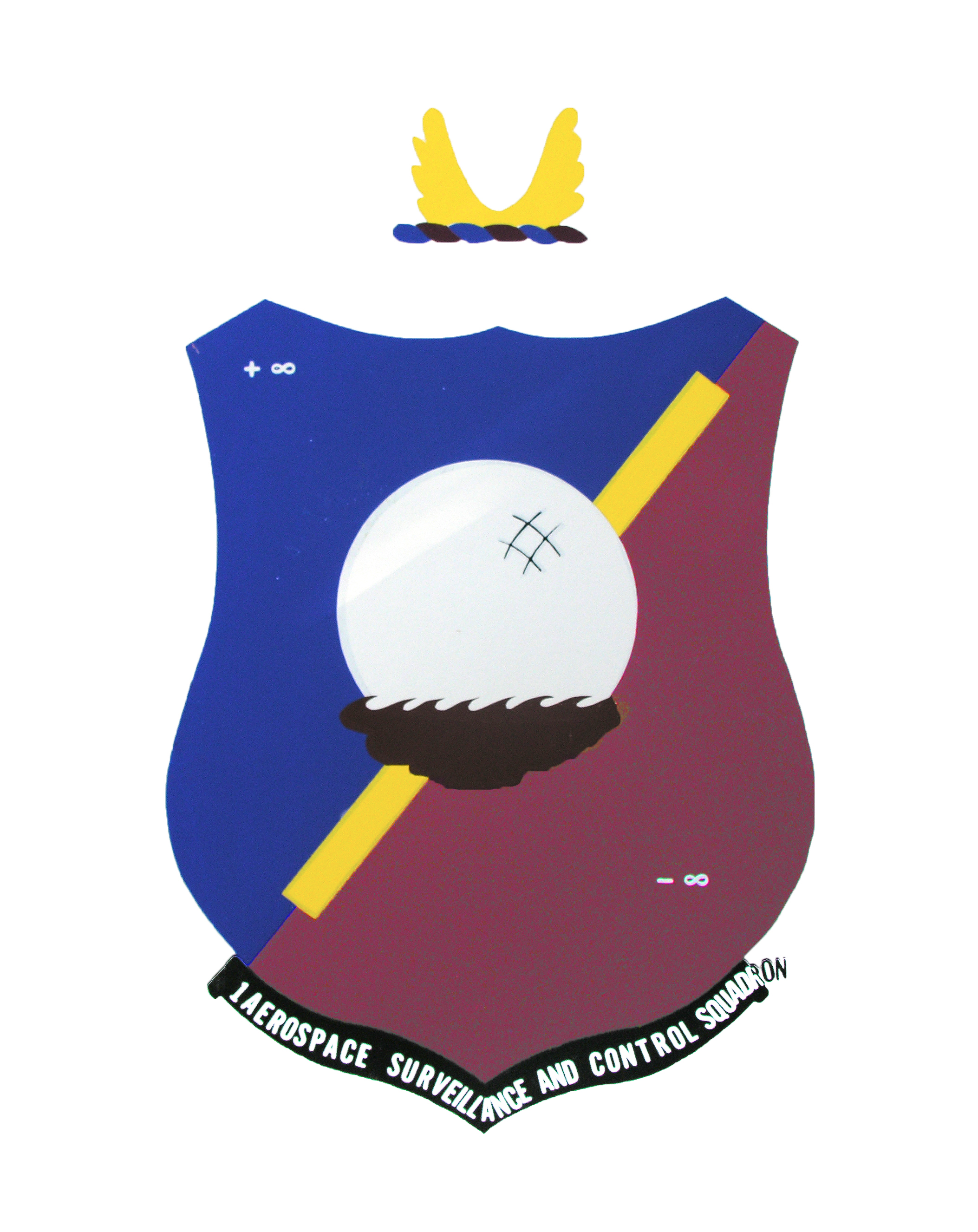
Unofficial 1st Aerospace Surveillance and Control Squadron emblem (Note: In 1961, the squadron had a competition to select the squadron emblem. One anonymous suggestion proved so popular that the squadron commander had copies made for all squadron members and other people who supported the squadron. The suggested blazon was posted with the submission. "Central in our noble emblem is a crystal ball, rampant on a field of confusion, depicted floating in a sea of coffee. The yellow streak, or batton sinister (heraldic mark of illegitimation [sic], commonly called the bastards' barr) maintains balance between the traditional ADC Azure (Shade 84) (the official color of USAF uniforms at the time) and NORAD purpure (NORAD was sometimes considered purple, the staff being a combination of Army red and Air Force and Navy blue). Unfortunately, this line of demarcation is not quite long enough to keep things from getting confused. (This is a reference to the ongoing tension between NORAD and ADC, at times even involving CINCNORAD General Laurence S. Kuter and the ADC Commander, Lt Gen Robert M. Lee; both sometimes appearing distinctly unfriendly). Emblazoned, dexter chief and sinister base, are the symbols of the accuracy within which we attempt to maintain our orbital ephemerides (plus and minus infinity). Beneath the shield, the heroic name of our noble organization will be forever proclaimed on a roll of six-ply carbon paper. The crest, above the shield, is a crying towel, presented with the compliments of the 496L SPO (the Systems Project Office responsible for the development of Project Space Track). It is supported by two wings, depicting the hopeful thought that, if things get too tough, you can always go fly.")

The squadron was originally organized on 14 February 1961, as the 1st Aerospace Surveillance and Control Squadron, a unit of Air Defense Command and became operational on 1 July 1961 as the SPACETRACK component of NORAD Space Detection and Tracking System (SPADATS). It was the operational version of research and development Project Space Track. Effective 1 October 1961, the Squadron was assigned to the 9th Aerospace Defense Division, which had been activated on 15 July 1961. The squadron name changed to 1st Aerospace Control Squadron on 1 July 1962.

Until April 1966, when operations were moved to the NORAD Cheyenne Mountain Complex, The squadron was located on the bottom two floors of Ent Air Force Base building P4 Annex, a former hospital building, adjacent to the NORAD command center.

The squadron was responsible for tracking all artificial earth satellites, space probes, carrier rockets, and debris, US and foreign. The mission included detecting additional objects previously unknown and maintaining a complete catalogue. It controlled a global network of ground sensors. It was the operational version of research and development Project Space Track and the Space Track component of NORAD's Space Detection and Tracking System

==== Sensors ====
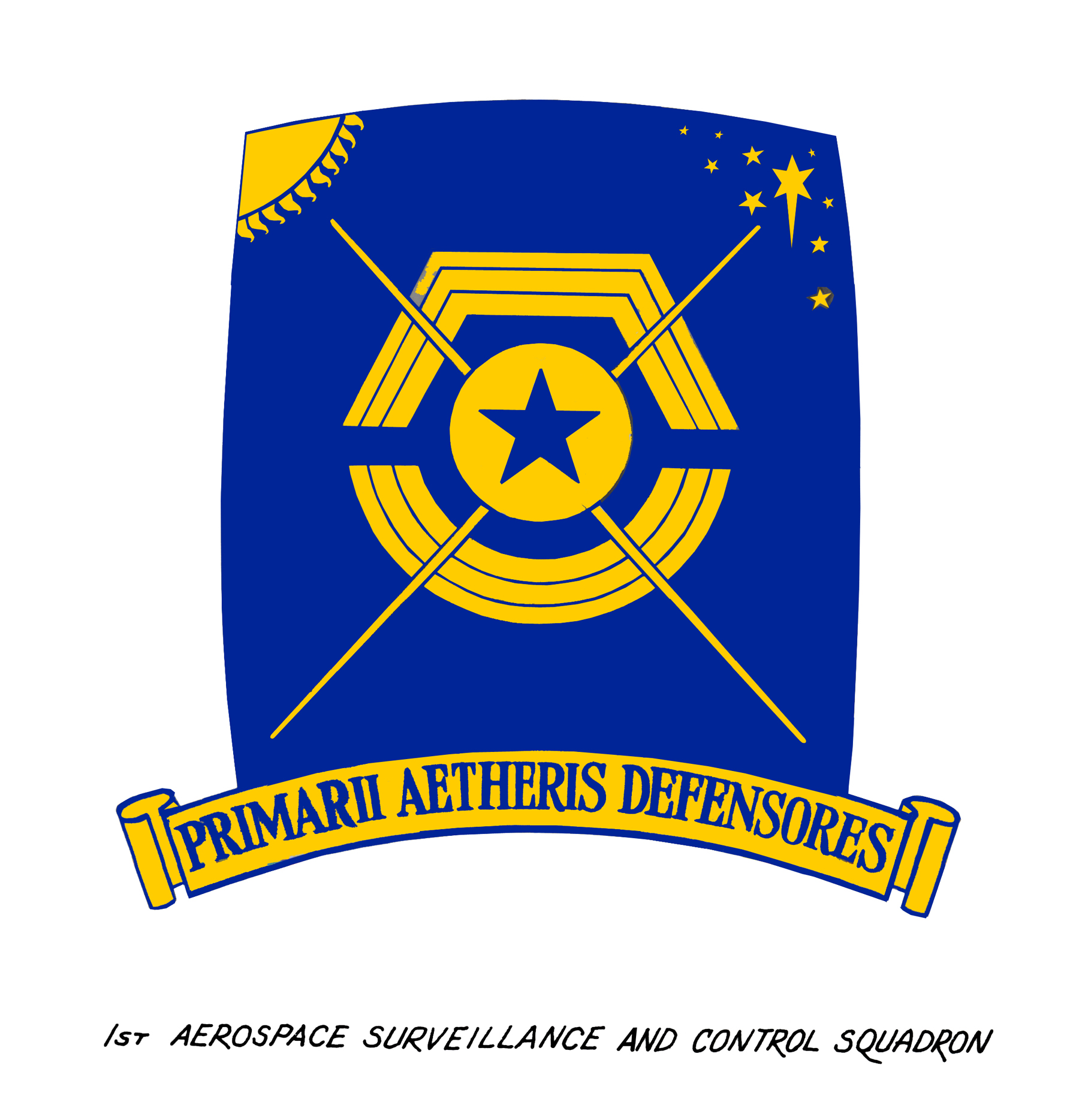
1st Aerospace Control Squadron emblem (approved 6 February 1962 (Note: On an Air Force blue rectangular area a stylized computer above a semicircular geometrical pattern all surmounted by a stylized satellite, its four antennae saltirewise, all Air Force golden yellow; the satellite charged with an Air Force blue star; issuing from dexter chief a portion of the sun in splendor, and in sinister chief a formation of stars, Air Force golden yellow. The emblem is symbolic of the squadron and its mission. Against a background resembling in shape the fan-like radar of the Ballistic Missile Early Warning System, deep blue in color to represent the sky, and supplemented with the sun and stars to indicate day and night operations, a stylized satellite of the Vanguard class symbolizes the squadron as the Vanguard of Aerospace Defense. The satellite surmounts two symbols representing a computer for analyses and computations and a detection system with the capability of the MIDAS system and world-wide sensors. The solitary star on the satellite indicates that this is the first organization of this type.)

The squadron had essentially the same set of sensors used by Project Space Track, with the addition of two additional Baker-Nunn cameras, one of which was used by the Royal Canadian Air Force at RCAF Station Cold Lake, Alberta, Canada. In March 1961, the Laredo Air Force Base sensor was transferred from Air Research and Development Command to Air Defense Command. It was operated by Detachment 1 of the squadron. In January 1968, the System 440L over-the-horizon radar reached initial operational capability. In 1968, SPACETRACK was also supported by the Royal Radar Establishment at Great Malvern, England. By mid-1969, three USAF Baker-Nunn cameras were operated in support of SPACETRACK under the 18th Surveillance Squadron, despite questions about their on-going utility in view of increasing radar tracking accuracies. An AN/FPS-85 phased array radar became operational at Eglin Air Force Base, Florida, in May 1970.

==== Orbital computations ====
The squadron initially made orbital predictions by computing ephemerides based on standard Kepler orbits. As a satellite got lower into the atmosphere, drag made it difficult to forecast the ephemeris of the satellite accurately. By 1962, the situation was somewhat better. The Soviet satellite Sputnik 4 was slowly entering lower orbits because of atmospheric drag. Using a new program, (Satellite General Perturbations Differential Corrections) and observations from the radar at Shemya Air Force Station, the orbital analyst plotted the changing orbital period and was able to predict the exact revolution on which the satellite reentered the atmosphere. (Note: A 20-pound piece of it landed on a street in downtown Manitowoc, Wisconsin on the western shore of Lake Michigan.) To make progress in automating ephemeris forecasts, Aeronutronic and TRW Inc. developed sophisticated new programs. Squadron orbital analysts evaluated the two programs. The Aeronutronic submission was named Spiral Decay and the TRW submission, Electronic Systems Precision Orbit Determination (ESPOD). ESPOD had been developed for Program 437, an anti-satellite program, to enable computation of trajectories for satellite intercept.

As a demonstration of the effectiveness of Spiral Decay, the program was used to forecast the reentry of Soviet Kosmos 23. Public media had been alerted to the impending decay and many people in Canada saw the fiery reentry. One racetrack even dimmed the lights to enhance the show. Spiral Decay was considered a more sophisticated program than ESPOD and used less computer time to attain more accurate results. It was selected as the standard for analysis, significantly helping predict future decay trajectories. It was also adopted as the primary computer capability for weapon engagement and was useful in more precisely locating sensors, such at the radar at Dyarbakir Air Station, Turkey.

On 1 March 1965, the rocket body of Kosmos 61 exploded between revolutions 1 and 2, giving 1st Aero another challenge to catalog the many fragments. Because the orbital period was 106 minutes, the fragments would not decay quickly. Two computer programs, SPACESWEEP and ALTEC, aided automation of the task but, when Cosmos 200 broke up on 23 January 1968, the breakup created severe problems for the Space Defense Center because of the amount of manual work needed. Also in March 1965, the Special Projects Division was supporting evaluation of the upgraded Shemya radar and the associated computer, in a project nicknamed Blue Fox. Blue Fox used both Spiral Decay and ESPOD to determine the accuracy of the new Shemya system, tracking satellites Transit 2A and ANNA 1B, a Navy geodetic satellite. The Blue Fox results, showing radar range biases of 129 meters or less, proved that the Shemya AN/FPS-80M was now the most accurate tracking radar in the system.

Orbital elements computed by the squadron, along with those computed by the Smithsonian Astrophysical Observatory and the NASA Goddard Space Flight Center, were included in the Satellite Situation Reports regularly published by the Goddard Center.)

==== Operations ====
In April 1961 a Philco 2000 computer was installed for dedicated squadron use. It was considered the fastest computer in the world at the time of installation. It still used IBM punched cards for data entry and was infamous for devouring the cards. The computer was programmed using Fortran for batch processing and the TAC assembly language for other work. However, Orbital Analysts still had Friden Square Root Calculators on their desks, a necessary tool.

Project Space Track at Laurence G. Hanscom Field, Massachusetts was the backup facility for squadron operations. About 49 hours before the 1st Squadron became operational, the Navy's Transit 4A carrier rocket exploded. Orbital analysts at the 1st and at Hanscom achieved a landmark in satellite tracking by identifying 296 of the fragments. On 5 June 1962, the relationship with Hanscom was formalized when several squadron officers activates the Space Track Center Alternate Facility at Hanscom. From 25 March to 6 April 1962, squadron orbital computations were transferred to Project Space Track while the Ent computer was being modified.

In mid-1962, the NORAD Deputy Chief of Staff for Intelligence expressed appreciation for the information and technical assistance the squadron provided in support of NORAD analysis of the Soviet Vostok 3 and Vostok 4 operations.

A new Soviet launch, which occurred on 1 November 1963. In plotting the observations made by the BMEWS radar at RAF Fylingdales, England, and other sensors the data showed an apparent change in the satellite's orbital period. The data indicated that the Soviets had boosted the satellite, changing its orbit. This confirmed a boast by Soviet Premier Nikita Khrushchev that the Soviets had a maneuverable satellite, something that had been treated with some disbelief by the intelligence community. It is now known that the satellite, called Polyot, was in fact a prototype orbital carrier rocket for an anti-satellite system. Only one other Polyot was launched (in April 1964); the system never became operational.

In mid-1965, there was concern that two Soviet satellites had attempted a rendezvous in space. Aeronutronic technicians combined the existing Xroads and Groundtrack programs into a new program that could compare the relative positions of two satellites. This enabled the duty orbital analyst to prove that a rendezvous had not taken place. (Note: The program was later called COMBO, which was appropriate, but later gave it the formal name, Computation of Miss Between Orbits. COMBO, with some modifications, continues to be a major program in the Space Track arsenal at Vandenberg AFB, as it enables forecasts of possible collisions in space, a major concern for all satellite programs, crewed and uncrewed.)

In 1966, the Gemini IV astronauts saw what appeared to be a nearby space object. The COMBO program did not identify any nearby satellites. Shortly thereafter a short movie clip of the mystery object taken by the astronauts indicated it was probably something associated with the spacecraft, perhaps dangling from a tether.

Squadron operations were based on the techniques developed at Project Space Track. By 1962, initial observations were processed by the Report Association Program which ran automatically twice a day plus twice for BMEWS data. The program associated observations with known orbits. The output of the program, plus data from the Checker Program, was sent to the duty space surveillance officer and technician for review with some assistance from the duty orbital analyst as needed.

Other special duty orbital analyst activity occurred when a satellite neared decay. When the orbital period fell below 90 minutes, the duty space surveillance officer notified the duty orbital analyst and a special analyst was normally assigned to monitor the decay. In the unusual case of the decay of a Discoverer recovery vehicle that had not come down where programmed, the duty orbital analyst had access to a special computer program, which provided a sub-satellite trace for one revolution, to assist in specifying the track. New friendly launches were handled by a duty orbital analyst dedicated to the task but, in the case of new Soviet launches, an analyst for intelligence was assigned.

Analysis of interplanetary and lunar probe launches were handled by Special Project Analysts, who had several special astrodynamic programs to assist in computations. The Encke program was used when the vehicle was within 125 earth radii and the Interplanetary program, adjusting for planetary perturbations, for vehicles beyond that distance. The Special Project Analysts also handled special requests for such things as very accurate orbital elements or decay information for a satellite (as might be required by research or educational groups). These analysts also monitored incoming technical papers, attended technical meetings to obtain information which was of use to the mission, and monitored improvements in decay forecasts.

=== Satellite control ===
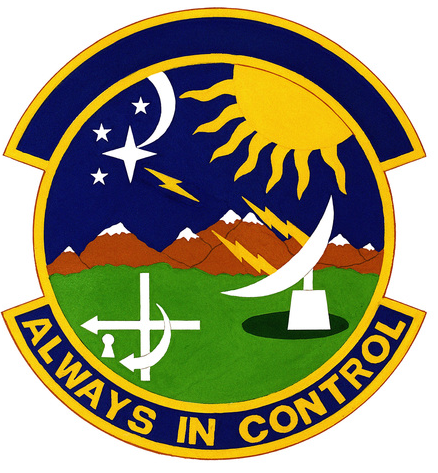
1st Satellite Control Squadron emblem.

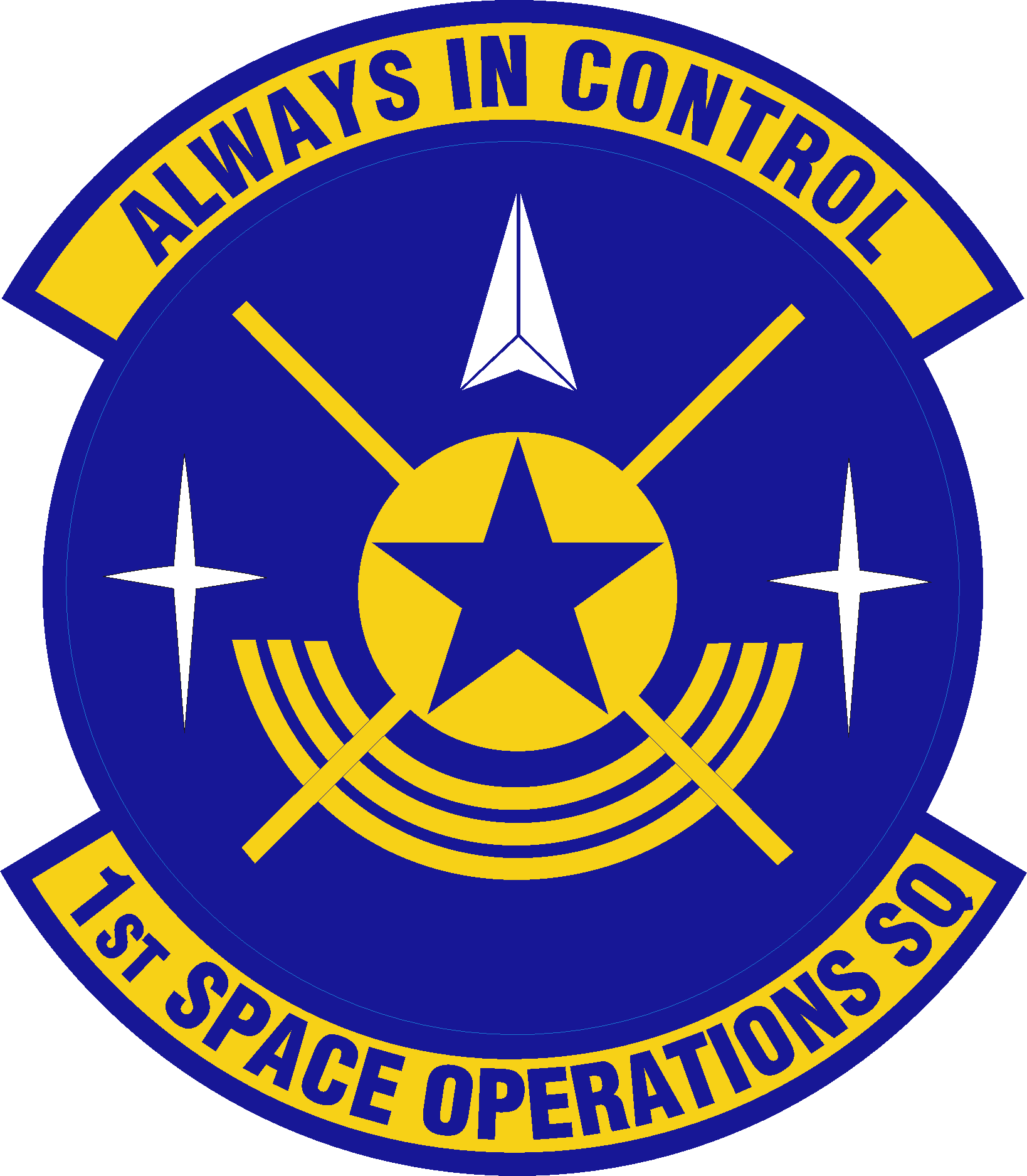
1st Space Operations Squadron emblem.

On 5 October 1987, the squadron was reactivated, renamed the 1st Satellite Control Squadron, and began its ever-growing satellite control mission. On 16 February 1988, the squadron began its first commanding on the DSP constellation.

The Space Operations Center (SOC) was operationally turned over to AFSPC on 21 December 1989. The SOC increased its mission on 20 February 1990, when the Defense Meteorological Satellite Program mission was operationally turned over. In May 1996, satellite command authority for the first research and development satellite controlled by AFSPC, Technology for Autonomous Operational Survivability, was given to 1st SOPS.

On 4 December 1998, the squadron assumed command and control capability on the Midcourse Space Experiment, which became an operational program on 1 October 2000, with the first-ever transfer of operations from the Ballistic Missile Defense Organization to AFSPC.

1st and 3d Space Operations Squadron members were deployed to Alexandria, VA control center from March - September 1996 on a 50 SW commander initiative to bring tactical satellite command and control to Air Force Space Command. During this period they controlled Miniature Sensor Technology Integration-3 (MSTI-3). After they completed their deployment, the MSTI-3 was controlled by Space and Missile Systems Center (SMC) test & evaluation (Onizuka AS, CA and Kirtland AFB, NM; now Space Development and Test Wing, Kirtland AFB) until the satellite was successfully de-orbited on 11 December 1997.

Operated Space Detection and Tracking System Center, tracking and cataloging man-made objects in space, 1961-1976. Satellite command and control for the NAVSTAR Global Positioning System, the Defense Meteorological Satellite Program, and the Defense Support Program, 1987-.

== List of commanders ==
- Col Robert Miller, 27 Mar 1961
- Col Bill R. Adams, 1 Jan 1965-unknown (at least Mar 1967)
- Col William C. Watts, by 1 Jan 1968
- Col Stanton G. Daries, 1 Jul 1970
- Col Bernard J. Szczutkowski Jr., 18 Sep 1972
- Col Thomas C. Brandt, by 30 Jun 1973-at least 30 Sep 1975
- Lt Col Donna L. Burk, 5 Oct 1987
- Maj Louis H. Schweichler, 10 Jun 1988 (acting)
- Maj Thomas Baugh, 14 Jun 1988
- Lt Col Alan H. Payne, 9 Feb 1990
- Lt Col Robert L. Hooten, 20 Feb 1992
- Lt Col Evan J. Hoapili, 4 Aug 1994
- Lt Col John F. Anthony Jr., 24 Jun 1996
- Lt Col Barry J. Bennett, 10 Jul 1998
- Lt Col Michael K. Chesonis, 30 May 2000
- Lt Col B. Edwin Wilson, 3 Jul 2002
- Lt Col Steven L. Lootens, 3 Jul 2003
- Lt Col Craig L. Bomberg, 6 Jul 2005
- Lt Col Erik J. Eliasen, 28 Jun 2007
- Lt Col Lorenzo Bradley, 16 July 2009
- Lt Col Michael Manor, July 2011
- Lt Col Toby Doran, 24 June 2013
- Lt Col Casey M. Beard, July 2015
- Lt Col Mark Bigley, 7 July 2017
- Lt Col Bryan Bell, ~2019
- Lt Col Patrick Gaynor, 21 June 2021
- Lt Col Galen Thorp, June 2023
- Lt Col Russell Smith, July 2025

== Lineage ==
- Constituted as the 1st Aerospace Surveillance and Control Squadron and activated on 6 February 1961 (not organized)

Organized on 14 February 1961
Redesignated 1st Aerospace Control Squadron on 1 July 1962
Inactivated on 21 April 1976

- Redesignated 1st Satellite Control Squadron on 25 September 1987

Activated on 5 October 1987
Redesignated 1st Space Operations Squadron on 30 January 1992

=== Assignments ===
- Air Defense Command, 6 February 1961 (not organized)
- 9 Aerospace Defense Division, 1 October 1961
- Fourteenth Aerospace Force, 1 July 1968 – 21 April 1976
- 2d Space Wing, 5 October 1987
- 50th Operations Group, 30 January 1992 – 24 July 2020
- Space Delta 9, 24 July 2020 – present

=== Stations ===
- Ent Air Force Base, Colorado, 14 February 1961
- Cheyenne Mountain Complex, Colorado, April 1966 - 21 April 1976
- Falcon Air Force Station (later Falcon Air Force Base, Schriever Space Force Base), Colorado, 5 October 1987 – present

=== Spacecraft Operated ===
- Global Positioning System (December 1989-December 2007)
- Defense Support Program (February 1988-before 2008)
- Defense Meteorological Satellite Program (December 1989-c 1996)
- Technology for Autonomous Operational Survivability (STEP Mission O) (May 1996-after 1997)
- DoD boosters (May 2003-March 2009)
- Space Based Space Surveillance (September 2010 – present)
- Midcourse Space Experiment (October 2000-July 2008)
- Miniature Sensor Technology Integration-3 (September 1996 - December 1998)
- Geosynchronous Space Situational Awareness Program (GSSAP) (2014 – present)

=== Awards ===
Award streamer	Award	Dates	Notes
	Air Force Outstanding Unit Award	1 June 1961–15 September 1963	1st Aerospace Surveillance and Control Squadron (later 1st Aerospace Control Squadron)
	Air Force Outstanding Unit Award	1 June 1973 – 30 June 1974	1st Aerospace Control Squadron
	Air Force Outstanding Unit Award	1 December 1987 – 30 November 1989	1st Satellite Control Squadron
	Air Force Outstanding Unit Award	1 September 1990 – 31 August 1991	1st Satellite Control Squadron
	Air Force Outstanding Unit Award	11 September 1993 – 31 August 1995	1st Space Operations Squadron
	Air Force Outstanding Unit Award	1 October 2000 – 1 October 2001	1st Space Operations Squadron
	Air Force Outstanding Unit Award	1 October 2001 – 1 October 2002	1st Space Operations Squadron
	Air Force Outstanding Unit Award	2 October 2002 – 2 October 2003	1st Space Operations Squadron
	Air Force Outstanding Unit Award	1 October 2007–30 September 2009	1st Space Operations Squadron
