= National Methodist Sanatorium =

Geography
- Location: Boulder Street and Union Boulevard, Colorado Springs, Colorado
- Coordinates: 38.839°N 104.796°W

History
- Founded: 1926
- Closed: 1943

The National Methodist Sanatorium was a 1926 medical facility on Boulder Street in Colorado Springs, Colorado. It was near the Beth-El Hospital, which is now Memorial Hospital. The Sanatorium was later used as the Air Defense Command and North American Aerospace Defense Command (NORAD) headquarters on Ent Air Force Base.

== Background ==
In 1874, Dr. Samuel Edwin Solly from London "moved to Manitou because of his wife's ill health." Colorado Springs's first medical facility was a c. 1887 small railroad infirmary that was followed by the St. Francis of Perpetual Adoration 1888 hospital on Institute Heights and the 1890–1902 Bellevue Sanitarium (later named National Deaconess Sanitarium). Beth-El Hospital opened in 1911 along East Boulder Street on land donated by General William Jackson Palmer.

Two small Sanatoriums were built on Logan street near Bethel Hospital: The Idlewold in 1912 at 311 N. Logan and by 1916, Nob Hill Lodge at 319 N. Logan. In 1918 on the east side of Beth-El Hospital, a 1918 Contagion Hospital opened which was later renamed (either Daniels Hall or Nurses Home.)

== Development and use ==
The sanatorium, part of the Beth-El General Hospital complex, was built for the treatment of tuberculosis. It was built on 29 acres east of the hospital for $2,000,000 (equivalent to $36,372,180 in 2025) and dedicated on November 9, 1926.

The Beth-El General Hospital became Memorial Hospital when it was sold to the city of Colorado Springs in 1943. The four-story National Methodist Sanatorium was converted into a building for the then-U.S. Army Air Forces at what would become known as the Colorado Springs Tent Camp in 1943. After a period of inactivity following World War II, the military installation was reestablished in 1951 and renamed Ent Air Force Base. The facility would continue to be used by various military commands tasked with the continental air defense of the United States and Canada until the closure of Ent AFB in 1976 as part of a service-wide post-Vietnam reduction in force. The site of the sanatorium is now on the property owned by the United States Olympic Training Center.
