= Project Space Track =

Research and development project of US Air Force

Project Space Track was a research and development project of the United States Air Force, to create a tracking system for all artificial satellites of the Earth and space probes. Triggered by the launch of Sputnik 1, the project was started in 1957 at the Air Force Cambridge Research Center at Laurence G. Hanscom Field in Bedford, Massachusetts. Observations were obtained from some 150 sensors worldwide by 1960, and regular orbital predictions were issued to the sensors and interested parties.

Space Track was the only organization that used observations from all types of sources: radar, optical, radio, and visual. All unclassified observations were shared with the Smithsonian Astrophysical Observatory. In 1961, the system was declared operational and assigned to the new 1st Aerospace Surveillance and Control Squadron until 1976, as part of NORAD's Space Detection and Tracking System.

== Establishment ==
On 29 November 1957, shortly after the launch of Sputnik 1, two German expatriates — Gerhard Robert Miczaika and Eberhart W. Wahl — formed Project Space Track (originally called Project Harvest Moon). It was established in Building 1535 of the Geophysics Research Directorate, Air Force Cambridge Research Center, Laurence G. Hanscom Field, Massachusetts. The mission of Space Track was to create a tracking system to track and compute orbits for all artificial satellites of the Earth. The first major tracking effort was Sputnik 2, which was launched on 3 November 1957, containing the dog Laika.

With the Soviet launch of Luna 1 on 2 January 1959, Space Track also started tracking space probes. An Electronic Support System Program Office was established in February 1959 at Waltham, Massachusetts under the direction of Col Victor A. Cherbak, Jr. By late 1959, the SPO had received additional responsibilities under the DoD's Advanced Research Projects Agency to develop techniques and equipment for military surveillance of satellites. Continuing development of Space Track was an integral part of this effort. In December 1959, Space Track was moved to a new building, the National Space Surveillance Control Center (NSSCC), which was formally dedicated on 9 February 1960. The NSSCC was part of the Air Force Command and Control Development Division (known informally as C²D²), under the Air Research and Development Command. Harold O. Curtis of MIT Lincoln Laboratory was Director of the NSSCC. By 1960, about 70 people were involved in operations at NSSCC.

In late 1960, USAF Vice Chief of Staff General Curtis LeMay decided that the research and development system was ready to become operational. On 1 July 1961, the new squadron became operational under the USAF Air Defense Command at Ent Air Force Base, Colorado Springs, part of NORAD's Space Detection and Tracking System. The first Squadron Commander was Colonel Robert Miller. The Space Track organization at Hanscom Field assumed a backup role for squadron operations. Disregarding the Air Force regulation on the subject, which specified clearly that unclassified nicknames, such as Space Track, should be two words (while codewords, such as CORONA, which were then themselves classified, should be only one word), ADC immediately decided to rename Space Track as SPACETRACK and the name has stuck since – although the web site of the 614th Air & Space Operations Center, which currently performs the mission, has reverted to two words. The 614th is part of the Combined Space Operations Center at Vandenberg Space Force Base in California.

== Sensors ==
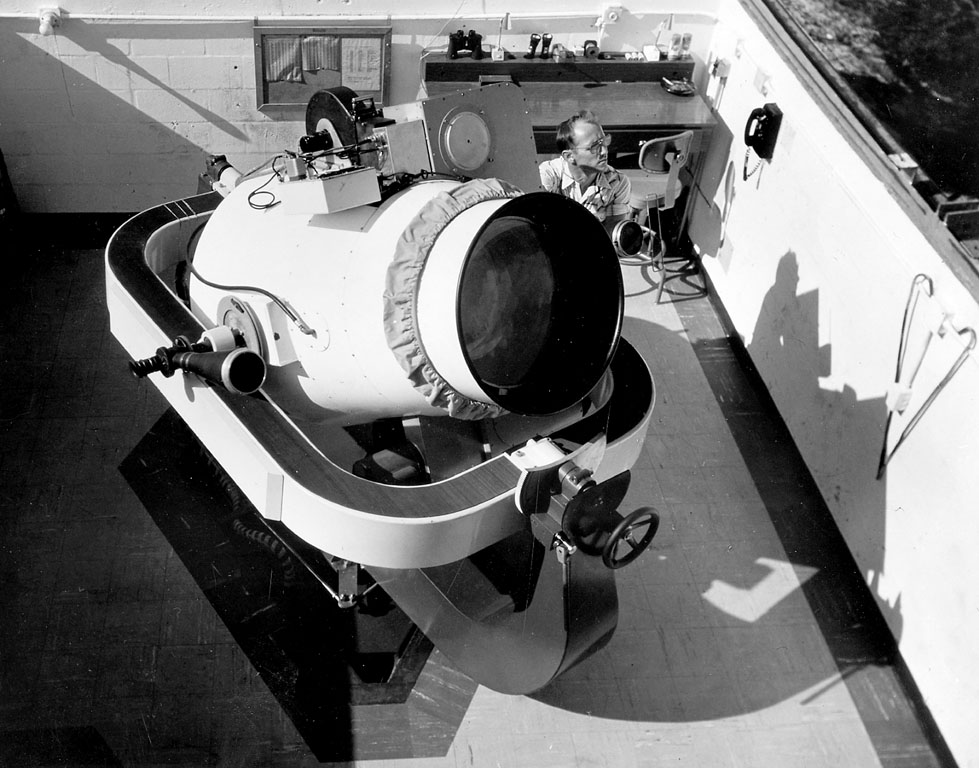
The Baker-Nunn satellite tracking camera

The Department of Defense had decided that the US Air Force should develop a command-and-control system for tracking satellites, and that the US Army and US Navy should develop sensors for that purpose. US Navy development was at Dahlgren, Virginia and the US Army's program was at the Aberdeen Proving Ground, Maryland.

Drs. Miczaika and Wahl had assembled a list of facilities that could track satellites, either by monitoring telemetry or by using radar. The latter were mostly astronomical radio telescopes equipped with radars used in studying the moon (e.g., Jodrell Bank Observatory, Millstone Hill, and a radar at the Stanford Research Institute). Two USAF radars, one on Shemya Island and the other at Diyarbakır, had been built to observe Soviet missile launches and became valuable for satellite tracking as well. BMEWS prototype radars on Trinidad also participated. Normally, the first radar reports of a new satellite launch from Baikonur Cosmodrome came from Shemya and the first of a new launch from Kapustin Yar came from Diyarbakır. USAF radars at the Laredo Air Force Station in Texas and one near Moorestown, New Jersey also participated. Observations were received from the Royal Canadian Air Force research radar at Prince Albert, Saskatchewan, Canada. The Goldstone facility of the Jet Propulsion Laboratory was also helpful with observations of Soviet space probes.

In general, observations were in the form of time, azimuth and elevation (and range, from radars) as measured at the site or, in some cases, such as at Goldstone, in astronomical form (Right Ascension and Declination) Some early observations were very primitive, such as a report that a satellite passed near a star that could be identified.

On rare occasions, the observations were purely verbal. For example, individuals on ships, planes, and islands in the Caribbean reported sightings of the decay of satellite 1957 β, although one aircraft was able to provide a detailed observation because the navigator happened to be completing a celestial fix at the exact time

Some sites could record the Doppler shift of satellite transmission or, in a few cases, the Doppler shift from their own transmissions reflected from the orbiting object. One doppler site was the Space Track Doppler Field Site at Billerica, Massachusetts. The observations obtained by this technique were the time of closest approach to the station.

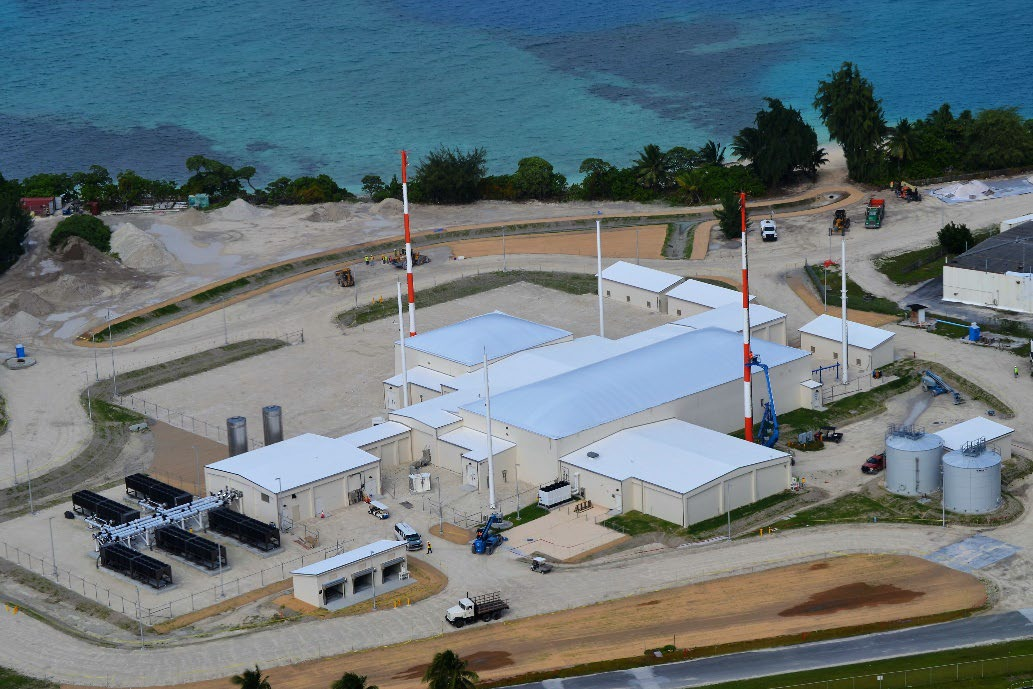
Space Fence site in Kwajalein Atoll

The Navy program was operated as NAVSPASUR and is now a Space Fence operated by the US Air Force. The Army program, although achieving accurate tracking results with doppler techniques and furnishing observations to Space Track, did not achieve funding for deployment.

One of SPASUR's contributions to satellite tracking was the invention of a map of the Earth that showed both poles, so that the position of all satellites, including those in polar orbits, could be shown. This was not possible with Mercator or other projections, which do not show the entire Earth. The map was, of course, very distorted at the poles (the North Pole was the entire top line of the long map) but the concept proved very useful.

Optical sensors included the twelve Baker-Nunn satellite tracking cameras operated for NASA by the Smithsonian Astrophysical Observatory (SAO), three Baker-Nunn cameras operated by the USAF, and the Boston University camera at Patrick Air Force Base operated by Walter Manning.

SAO cameras were at Woomera, Australia; Jupiter, Florida; Organ Pass, New Mexico; Olifantsfontein, Union of South Africa; Cadiz, Spain; Mitaka, Japan; Nani Tal, India; Arequipa, Peru; Shiraz, Iran; Curaҫao, Netherlands West Indies; Villa Dolores, Argentina; and Haleakala, Maui, USAF cameras were at Oslo, Norway; Edwards AFB, California, and Santiago, Chile. Two additional cameras were later added to the USAF inventory – one of the USAF cameras was transferred to the Royal Canadian Air Force at Cold Lake, Alberta, Canada in 1961.

Volunteer amateur astronomers as part of the SAO Moonwatch Team also contributed observations. Among these many volunteers was Arthur S. Leonard of Davis, California, leader of the Sacramento, California team.

By 1960, Space Track had about 150 cooperating sensors. Space Track was the only US organization that used all methods of observation to track satellites.

The observations were recorded on IBM punched cards for computer processing. All unclassified observations were exchanged daily with the Smithsonian Astrophysical Observatory, Cambridge, Massachusetts.

Space track maintained close contact with the US National Security Agency, the CIA Foreign Missile and Space Analysis Center (FMSAC), and Headquarters USAF Intelligence, Major Harry Holeman.

It was helpful that the USSR press service, TASS, always announced new Soviet satellite or space probe launches promptly, so Space Track was free to discuss the new objects without worrying about compromising sources. Translations of the Russian announcements were provided by the Foreign Broadcast Information Service (FBIS).

== Orbital computations ==
Dr. Wahl had been computing all the satellite ephemerides by hand using a Friden Square Root Calculator, the most advanced mechanical calculator then available.

The method for computing ephemerides (documented in detail in a 1960 report by P.M. Fitzpatrick and G.B. Findley) was originally developed by Dr. Wahl, based on historic astronomical methods.

In late August 1958, Space Track obtained its first computer, an IBM 610, used in conjunction with the Cambridge Research Center IBM 650. The IBM 610 was a very primitive machine, the programing of which was done with a plug board (similar to the ones used for IBM accounting machines in the early 1950s) and a punched paper tape.

The new NSSCC building was equipped with an IBM 709 and, a few months later, with an IBM 7090. Major programming of the new computers was done by the Aeronutronic Division of the Ford Motor Company, Newport Beach CA. The Wolf Corporation also supported the NSSCC.

The ephemeris computations were issued in what was called a bulletin. The bulletin listed each equatorial crossing of the satellite and described the path between crossings. Space track also furnished "look angles", altitude and azimuth directions so that specific sensors could point in the correct direction to acquire the satellite. Special versions of the look angles were tailored for specific sites, such as the Army and Navy sensor development projects. At the NSSCC, these computations were transmitted by the Duty Controller.

Space Track also issued public catalogues listing all the satellites, including ones no longer in orbit, called Satellite Situation Reports, which gave basic orbital elements for each piece. At first, this took less than a page of type. The Smithsonian Astrophysical Observatory also issued a similar document but, in 1961, NASA's Goddard Space Flight Center assumed responsibility for both reports, combining them into one document.

In October 1960, George Westrum presented a short college-level course in Celestial Mechanics for those NSSCC personnel who wished to participate

== Operations ==
By international agreement under the International Astronomical Union, the satellites and space probes were initially named with Greek letters, following the system for naming stars in constellations. The year of launch was included in the launch names, so Sputnik I was 1957 Alpha. The payload was called Alpha I, when known – in the case of Sputnik I, it wasn't clear initially which was the payload, so the payload became Alpha II. Other pieces were also numbered, so the carrier rocket was usually Alpha II. The 24 Greek letters were soon used, so the next sequence started Alpha Alpha and so forth. By 1962 Beta Psi had been launched and it was clear that the Greek alphabet system would no longer work. Thereafter, launches were numbered, starting with 1963-1 with the payload normally being 1963-1A, etc...

As soon as a new satellite or space probe was launched, Space Track alerted the primary sensors and processed observations as they came in, issuing a preliminary tracking bulletin promptly and updating it after about 24 hours when additional observations from around the world had been obtained. Routine bulletins continued to be issued regularly as needed to keep up with the changing orbits, some of which decayed fairly rapidly in the atmosphere. There was another flurry of activity when the last revolutions occurred, as it was difficult to forecast the exact reentry path.

The NSSCC had a room dedicated as a filter center for monitoring communications and obtaining observations. The filter center had displays listing the orbiting and decayed satellites and a projector system that could show the motion of one satellite over the earth. The displays were devised by A/3C Peter P. Kamrowski. The center was staffed by a Duty Controller and assistants. The center was designed by Senior Controller 1st Lt Cotter, based on his earlier experience as a volunteer member of the USAF Ground Observer Corps (the Ground Observer Corps filter centers were in turn based on the United Kingdom aircraft tracking centers developed during World War II to track Nazi aircraft).

By 1960, the position of Duty Analyst was established. Once observations had been reduced, the duty analyst reviewed them and decided which orbits needed to be recomputed to bring them up to date. In the case of new launches or decaying satellites, one analyst was dedicated to processing observations for that satellite.

As with many other activities in the dawning space age, Space Track operations often involved doing things for which no precedent existed.

=== Unusual Space Track operations ===
On 2 January 1959, the Soviets launched Luna 1 (aka Mechta (Dream)), their first lunar probe. Tracking data was obtained for Space Track by the Goldstone site of the California Institute of Technology, which verified that the probe had headed for the moon. Dr. Curtis used a plot of this data in a presentation to a committee of the US House of Representatives. His presentation helped influence President Kennedy to establish the Apollo Program. Kenneth E. Kissell later published a Project Space Track analysis of the trajectory.

At this period, the 6594th Aerospace Test Wing was trying to achieve a successful launch in the Discoverer satellite program. The satellites, launched from Vandenberg AFB, were all in polar orbits. They were controlled by the 6594th at Palo Alto (later the Air Force Satellite Control Facility at Sunnyvale CA). Lt Cotter was the liaison officer between Space Track and the 6594th. The first 12 launch attempts were failures; the first success was Discoverer 1 (1959 Beta). Lockheed Corporation, the development contractor, won their bonus payment because the telemetry showed the satellite achieved orbit, but it was never seen again, despite massive Space Track and other efforts to find it.

By this time Space Track had contacts with many sensors around the world. One of them was at the South Pole, associated with the International Geophysical Year. One of their ninety observations of Discoverer 2 (1959 Gamma) was sent from Byrd Station saying that the satellite had passed to the left of the zenith at 2.25 degrees, implying an orbital inclination of 89.9 degrees. This report is probably the only direct observation of the inclination of a satellite's orbit that has ever been made.

Because the Discoverer satellites carried payloads that were deorbited and recovered from parachutes by aircraft of the 6594th Aerospace Test Wing based in Hawaii, the timing of deorbit was critical. (The deorbit attempt of Discoverer 2's payload went seriously wrong: the payload landed on Spitsbergen, instead of coming down over the Pacific ocean. It was recovered by Russian miners, likely very helpful to Russian intelligence and the Russian space program in general). Later, to improve the accuracy of the deorbit commands, orbital analysts Lt Algimantas Šimoliūnas, Lawrence Cuthbert, or Ed Casey would update the Space Track ephemeris for each Discoverer at the last minute and send the update to the 6594th. The 6594th had a global network of tracking stations (including Alaska, Hawaii, Seychelles, Guam, and the UK), used for command and on-orbit control of the satellites. However, the tracking data was derived from telemetry monitoring and was not as precise as the Space Track data, which was based in major part on radar and optical tracking.

Lockheed decided to put a small light on Discoverer XI (1960 Delta). Space Track acted as liaison between the 6594th and the Smithsonian Astrophysical Observatory, to use their Baker-Nunn camera at Cadiz, Spain, to photograph the light. This would give Lockheed valuable information about the accuracy of their orbit computations. The experiment worked very well and was not repeated.

Discoverer XIX (1960 Tau) had a payload called MIDAS, the developmental version of what later became the Defense Support Program. The Air Force decided that the MIDAS orbit should be classified, which meant that Space Track sensor observations had to be classified also. This led to a surreptitious midnight data transfer in central Concord, Massachusetts between Dr. Gordon Pettingill of Millstone Hill and Lt Cotter, as there was no secure teletypewriter or telephone available.

Perhaps causing inadvertent fireworks in celebration of the activation of the 1st Aerospace Surveillance and Control Squadron, the Ablestar stage for the Navy's Transit 4A satellite, 1961 Omicron, which was launched on 29 June 1961, exploded about 77 minutes after attaining orbit, at 0608Z. The NORAD Ballistic Missile Early Warning System (BMEWS) made early radar observations and Mr. Leonard of the Sacramento, California Moonwatch team alerted Space Track when he saw many fragments where only a few satellites were expected from the launch. In the next few days, this gave Project Space Track its first major effort as a backup for the new squadron. Lawrence W. Cuthbert, 1st Lt Algimantas Šimoliūnas, and Ed Casey achieved a landmark in satellite tracking, plotting observations by hand and identifying orbits for 296 of the fragments. Orbital Analysts at 1st Aero were also heavily involved in the achievement. Observations from the SPASUR fence were very helpful in tracking the fragments (SPASUR had initially refused to send Space Track individual observations, sending instead only orbital parameters, but this policy had fortunately been changed by 1961).

The technique used to identify multiple objects orbiting in the same orbital plane was refined by Lawrence Cuthbert and published as an automated program by the Wolf Corporation [Later, Larry worked with Bob Morris, Chief Orbital Analyst at Colorado Springs, to develop a program to derive orbital elements for all unknown radar tracks; the methodology worked and it became known as the Cuthbert-Morris Algorithm. The resulting program was called "Breakup, Lost and Decay" and, along with subsequent improvements, it has found thousands of the objects in the Space Satellite Catalog. It is still the Air Force Astrodynamic Standard for Uncorrelated Target (UCT) processing.

== Communications ==
Most Space Track communication was by teletypewriter or, in some cases, by telephone, mail, or messenger.

The bulletins and look angles were initially typed by hand by airmen in the communications office and sent by teletypewriter to all the participating sensors. The teletypewriter machines used punched paper tape, before the invention of chadless tape.

Eventually, Roy Norris and Lt Cotter inveigled the IBM 610 into cutting paper tapes for the satellite bulletins, so that the airmen in the communication department would not have to type all the data by hand. This was not part of the IBM 610 design and was a surprise to IBM personnel. Later computers would also prepare the bulletin and look angle data tapes automatically.

There was some limited secure communication: One method valid for sending classified information was a pair of one-time pads. These pads were each made of twin sets of pages, the top one of which had all letters and numbers on a line, perhaps 40 lines to a page. The top sheet was carbonless paper. To use the sheets, one circled each letter or number row-by-row on the top sheet. This marked the second sheet, which had all the letters and numbers scrambled. The scrambled version could then be transmitted by teletypewriter or telephone to the recipient who, using his matching set of one-time pads, could reverse the process and read the secure message.

Another method Space Track later had was a secure teletypewriter machine that had a pre-punched paper tape attached. The tape served to garble each letter typed, which could then be decrypted by a reverse procedure at the other end of the teletypewriter line. This system was used to communicate with Air Force Intelligence at the Pentagon. More sophisticated cryptographic equipment was available later.

In addition to data communications, Space Track published a series of technical reports. (e.g. see References,).

Dr. Wahl presented detailed descriptions of Space Track activity at the first two International Symposia on Rockets and Astronautics in Tokyo, 1959 and 1960. Dr. Curtis and Lt Cotter made a similar presentation in 1960.

=== Contractors ===
In 1960, Aeronutronic, a division, of the Ford Motor Company, had a contract with Space Track to develop improved methods of predicting the orbits of decaying satellites, a computer program called Spiral Decay, and for other software for new computers in the new building. (Aeronutronic had been hired to do a system analysis of the control center on 1 October 1959. Detailed reports of this and other Aeronutronic support of Project Space Track are on file at the offices of Lockheed Martin (formerly Loral Corporation) in Colorado Springs, Colorado. An index of the reports is at the National Museum of the Air Force.)

Another very important group was the employees of Wolf R&D Corporation (Concord, Massachusetts), which did programming and had the contract for operating computers at the NSSCC, including the IBM 7090 mainframe.
