= Cheyenne Mountain Space Force Station =

US Space Force installation in Colorado

- Near Colorado Springs, Colorado in United States
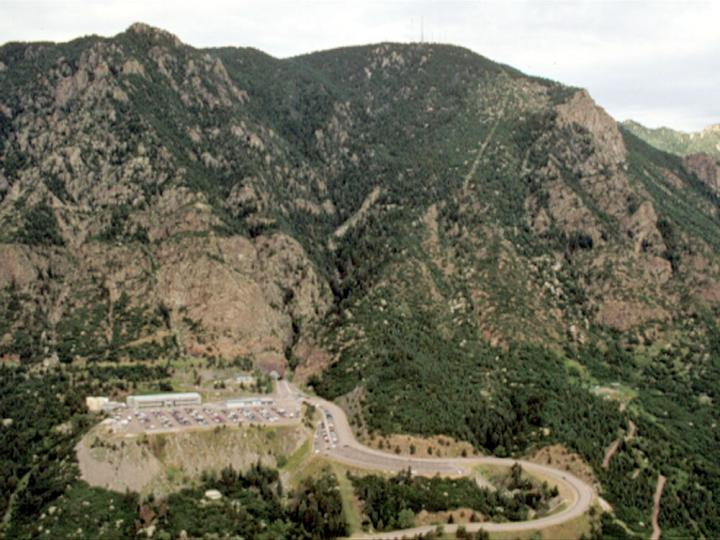
- An aerial view of Cheyenne Mountain Space Force Station

- Shield of the Space Base Delta 1

Site information
- Type: United States Space Force
- Owner: Department of Defense
- Operator: United States Space Force
- Controlled by: Space Base Delta 1
- Condition: Operational

Location
- Location in the United States
- Coordinates: 38°44′37.57″N 104°50′48.40″W

Site history
- Built: 1961 – 1965
- Built by: US Army Corps of Engineers
- In use: 1965 – present

Garrison information
- Occupants: NORAD Alternate Command Center

Cheyenne Mountain Space Force Station (CMSFS) is located in Cheyenne Mountain on the Front Range of the Rocky Mountains in unincorporated El Paso County, Colorado, next to Colorado Springs, The Cheyenne Mountain Complex, an underground facility within Cheyenne Mountain SFS, was first built for the North American Aerospace Defense Command (NORAD) Combat Operations Center, though NORAD moved day-to-day operations to its headquarters on Peterson AFB in 2006. However, day-to-day operations were moved back in 2011 after a major overhaul and renovation.

The location now supports U.S. Space Command's Missile Warning Center, other strategic warning and survivable capabilities, and provides a ready alternative operating location for NORAD's command center.

== Background ==
Until 2006, Cheyenne Mountain was the center for the United States Space Command and NORAD which monitored the air space of Canada and the United States through a worldwide system for early warnings of missiles, space systems, and foreign aircraft. The operations center was moved from an above-ground facility, vulnerable to missile or bomber attack, to the "granite shielded security" within Cheyenne Mountain during the Cold War as the Cheyenne Mountain Complex. The complex was built in the mid-1960s, began operations in 1966, and NORAD's Combat Operation Center was fully operational on 6 February 1967.

Today the Space Force Station is used as a crew training center and is skeleton crewed and maintained as an alternate command center. It has its own power plant, heating and cooling system, and water supply. The underground complex was built under 2,000 ft (610 m) of granite within five acres of excavated tunnels. Structures outside of the military complex include the parking lots and roads, an old heliport, (Note: The heliport is located off Norad Road, before the parking lot, at 38°44′29″N 104°50′03″W.) and the fire station. (Note: The fire station is located at 38°44′29″N 104°50′03″W.) Outdoor facilities include Mountain Man Park, picnic areas, a racquetball facility, softball field, sand volleyball, basketball, a putting green, and horseshoes. There is a fitness center inside and outside the mountain. The portals for the blast tunnel are entered off the parking lot. The Air Force is responsible for all of NORAD Road, to Hwy 115, but has permitted local residents to access the road with motorized vehicles only per an easement agreement between the Space Force and City of Colorado Springs. A military gate limits NORAD Road usage past the residential turn-off just west of the State Highway 115 interchange.

The military complex has, in the past, included many units of NORAD, U.S. Space Command, Aerospace Defense Command, Air Force Systems Command, Air Weather Service, and the Federal Emergency Management Agency. The complex's communication center is also used by the nearby U.S. Civil Defense Warning Center. The station has an exercise, weights, and cardio gym that is open 24 hours a day.

United States Space Force units are under the command of Space Base Delta 1 at Peterson Space Force Base. Colorado Springs has a number of military installations. The others are Fort Carson, Schriever Space Force Base, Peterson Space Force Base, and the United States Air Force Academy.

== Air Force Space Command ==
The entire installation at Cheyenne Mountain was designated the Cheyenne Mountain Air Station by February 1995. In 2000, the installation was renamed Cheyenne Mountain Air Force Station. By that year all Air Force Space Command Air Stations in the United States had been redesignated as Air Force Stations. At one time, the Air Force Station was the site of NORAD's Air Defense Operations Center. That function, along with other day-to-day NORAD operational missions, moved to the NORAD and USNORTHCOM headquarters building on Peterson Air Force Base.

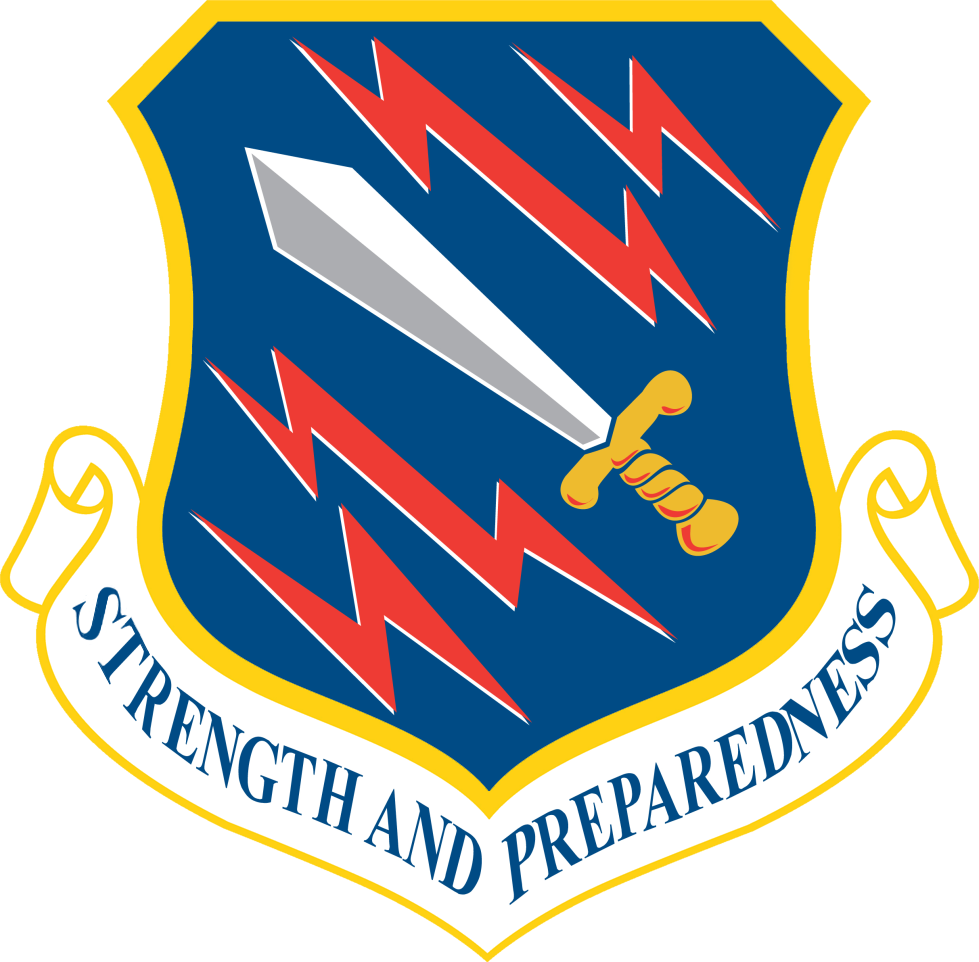
21st Space Wing emblem

Cheyenne Mountain Space Force Station is supported and operated by the 21st Space Wing, which is headquartered at Peterson Space Force Base and under the command of Space Operations Command (SpOC) and U.S. Space Command. In addition to supporting Peterson Space Force Base, the wing conducts operation space missions such as operating missile warning radar and cataloguing objects in space for the U.S. Space Command. Those operational missions are managed by the 21st Operations Group. The 21st Space Wing operates radar systems in the United States and worldwide, monitoring for launches of ballistic missiles and new space systems up to 22,300 mi (35,900 km) above the Earth. As of 2014, there are at least 20 countries able to launch long-range weapons, including chemical, biological, and nuclear weapons. Cheyenne Mountain AFS force support and logistics services are provided by the 21st Mission Support Group at Peterson SFB. All other support such as equipment and facilities, including the Integrated Tactical Warning and Attack Assessment (ITW/AA) weapon system, are operated and maintained by the 721st Mission Support Group of the 21st Space Wing. The 721 Mission Support Group is located at Cheyenne Mountain. The 721st Civil Engineering Squadron operated from 1966. Under Col Joseph Turk, 721st Mission Support Group Commander at the time, it was reactivated, reversing a 2004 action where its functions were outsourced. The last active duty commander was Lt Col Todd Wynn, who is now retired. It was re-activated on 17 July 2012, bringing some of the functions in-house under civilian employees. The civil engineering squadron is responsible for the engineering, maintenance, and operation of the complex.

In 2006, the Space Control Center, the command and control hub for space surveillance in the United States, transferred its operations to the newly created Joint Space Operations Center (JSpOC) from Cheyenne Mountain Air Force Station. The JSpOC belongs to United States Strategic Command's Joint Functional Component for Space (JFCC SPACE); it is not part of NORAD or U.S. Northern Command. The Air Force Space Command support remained at the Cheyenne Mountain Air Force Station under the 21st Space Wing's 721st Mission Support Group.

Global warning functions within the complex include the North American Aerospace Defense Command/U.S. Northern Command's Alternate Command Center, U.S. Strategic Command's Missile Warning Center, the 721st Global Strategic Warning/Space Surveillance System Center of the Integrated Tactical Warning/Attack Assessment system.

The Missile Warning Center, a directorate under USSTRATCOM's JFCC Space, was upgraded in June 2011, upon completion of a US$2.9 million project over 18 months. It was funded by USSTRATCOM and resulted in newer computers, more efficient workspace, a new knowledge visual display, new joint worldwide intelligence communication systems, and a new electronic procedural checklist.

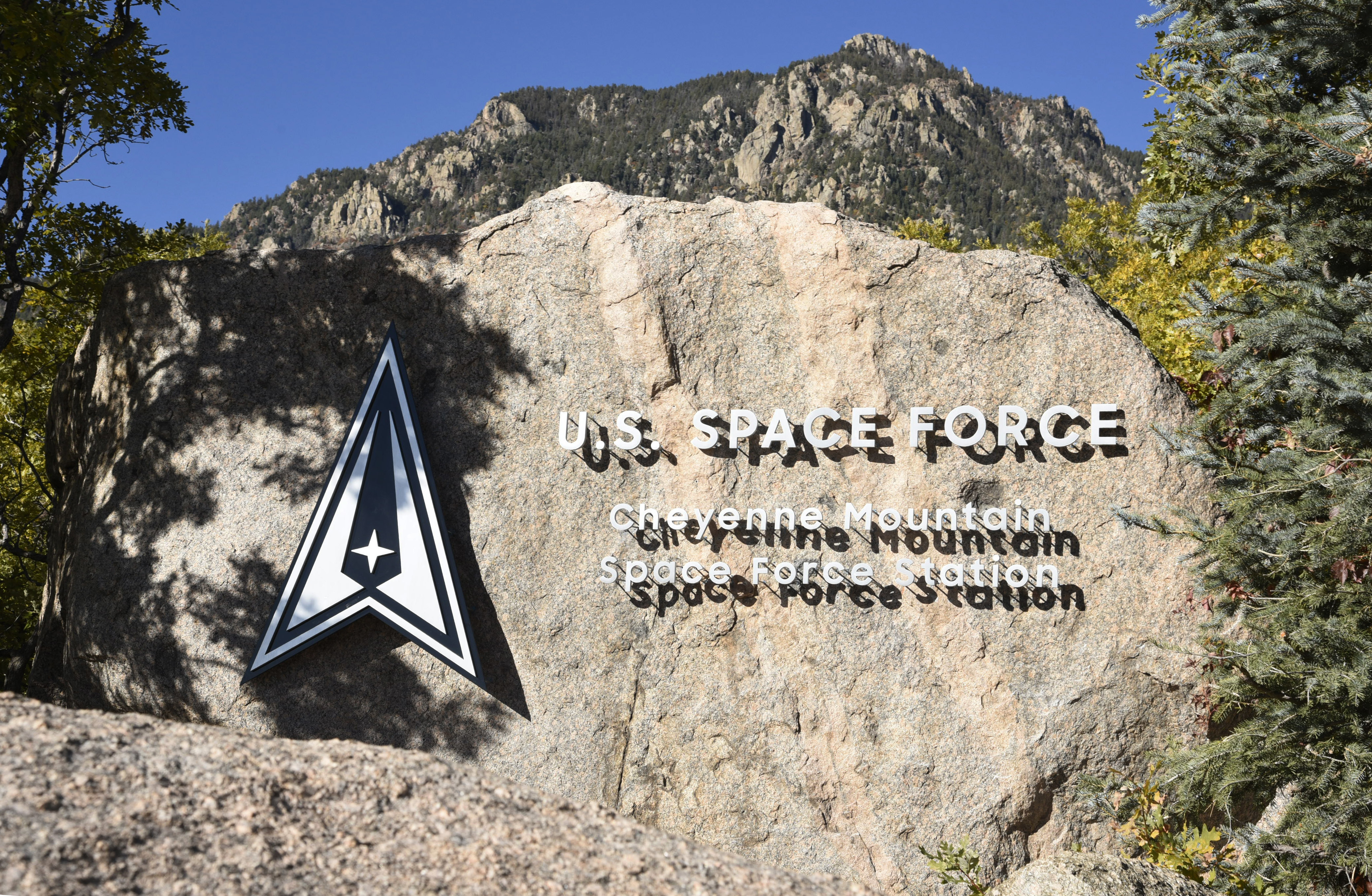
Cheyenne's updated base sign on October 16, 2021

Tons of debris built up at the entrance to the Cheyenne Mountain Air Force Station following heavy rainfall and a resulting rock slide in September 2013. The 4th Infantry Division, with support by the 615th Engineer Company, 52nd Engineer Battalion, of Fort Carson cleared away the debris from the rockslide and uprooted trees. The storm and resulting debris did not limit the Air Force Station's operations, according to the 721st Mission Support Group's commander Col Travis Harsha, who became commander on 11 July 2013 for the now retired Col Joseph Turk.

On 5 September 2013, Cheyenne Mountain Air Force Station hosted an event with Federal Bureau of Investigation (FBI), local sheriffs and police chiefs, Army security forces, and Air Force security across several military installations about partnering for law enforcement and emergency management events, like terrorist threats, criminal activity, and forest fires. Partnering with law enforcement and the community helps to "foster information sharing and maximize joint training opportunities", according to Col Travis Harsha, the CMAFS installation commander and 721st Mission Support Group Commander.

On 20 December 2019, Air Force Space Command was redesignated as the U.S. Space Force and elevated to become an independent military branch.

On 26 July 2021, the installation was renamed Cheyenne Mountain Space Force Station.

== Cheyenne Mountain ==
The facility is adjacent to the Cheyenne Mountain State Park. A telecommunication antenna farm is located on the highest point and Pike National Forest is on the west side of the mountain. The mountain is also the site of the Cheyenne Mountain Zoo and Will Rogers Shrine of the Sun.
