= Ent Air Force Base =

Former United States Air Force base in Colorado, United States

Ent Air Force Base
- Part of Air Defense Command (ADC)
- Colorado Springs, Colorado, USA
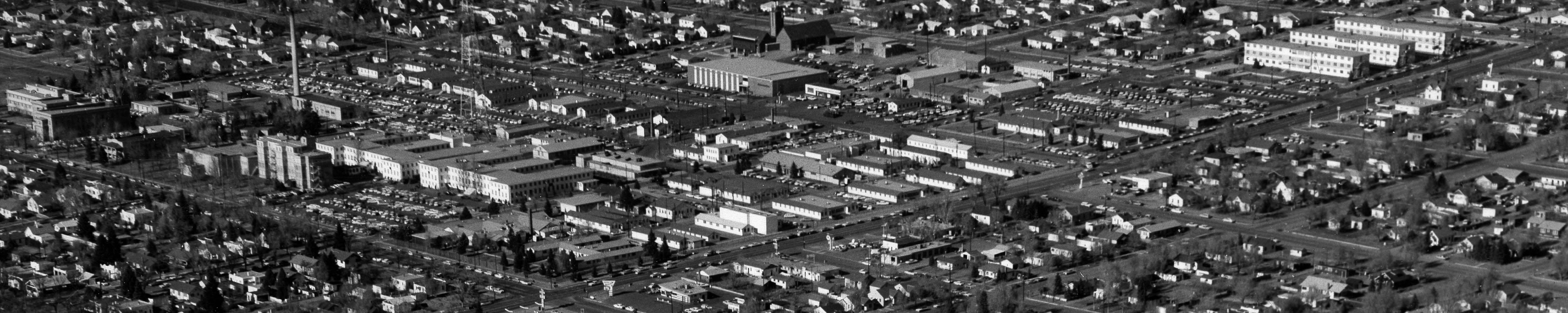
- Ent Air Force Base at E. Boulder (center to upper left) and N. Union Blvd (center to upper right).

Site information
- Type: Air Force Base
- Controlled by: United States Air Force

Location
- Coordinates: 38°50′27″N 104°47′47″W

Site history
- In use: 1943–49: Colorado Springs Tent Camp; 1951–75: Ent Air Force Base; 1975–76: Ent Annex

The Ent Air Force Base (Blue) was one of several early Cold War military sites in the Colorado Springs area. It was 47 acres (19 ha).

Ent Air Force Base was a United States Air Force base located in the Knob Hill neighborhood of Colorado Springs, Colorado. A tent city, established in 1943 during construction of the base, was initially commanded by Major General Uzal Girard Ent (1900–1948), for whom the base is named. The base was opened in 1951.

From 1957 to 1963, the base was the site of North American Aerospace Defense Command (NORAD), which subsequently moved to the Cheyenne Mountain Air Force Station. The base became the Ent Annex to the Cheyenne Mountain facility in 1975. The base was closed in 1976. The site later became the location of the United States Olympic Training Center, which was completed in July 1978.

== Background ==
The first Air Defense Command was established on 26 February 1940, by the War Department. On 2 March 1940, it was put under the First Army Commander. It managed air defense within four geographic air districts. It was inactivated in mid-1944 when the threat of air attack seemed minimal.

With the beginning of the Cold War, American defense experts and political leaders began planning and implementing a defensive air shield, which they believed was necessary to defend against a possible attack by long-range, manned Soviet bombers. The Air Defense Command was established 21 March 1946 and the major command was established at Mitchel Field (later Mitchel Air Force Base) in New York on 27 March 1946, which was commanded by Lieutenant General George E. Stratemeyer.

By the time of the United States Air Force creation in 1947, as a separate service, it was widely acknowledged the Air Force would be the center point of this defensive effort. The Air Force established the Continental Air Command under both the Air Defense Command and Tactical Air Command on 1 December 1948, at which time Commanding General Gordon P. Saville (later Major General) took command. The Air Defense Command was inactivated as a major command on 1 July 1950. The Air Defense Command was reconstituted by the United States Air Force 1 January 1951, to protect the United States air space, with two geographically based organizations. The portion of the country east of the 103rd meridian was managed by the Eastern Air Defense Force (also First Air Force territory). The command for the Western Air Defense Force (also Second Air Force territory) was at Ent Air Force Base. The functions included an early warning system to identify and respond to impending air attacks, including fighter interception. Subordinate Air Force commands were given responsibility to protect the various regions of the United States.

== Colorado Springs Tent Camp ==
The Colorado Springs Tent Camp was the headquarters for the Second Air Force beginning early June 1943. It was moved from Fort George Wright in the state of Washington to the more central location within the western half of the United States—the Second Air Force territory. The tent city was used for soldiers who worked on the conversion of the National Methodist Sanatorium (Note: The four-story National Methodist Sanatorium was converted into a building for the Ent Air Force Base. The sanatorium, part of the Beth-El General Hospital complex, was opened in November 1926, dedicated to the treatment of tuberculosis. The Beth-El General Hospital became Memorial Hospital when it was sold to the city of Colorado Springs in 1943.) for military use and construction of additional buildings for the base. Beginning in 1943, the Second Air Force was commanded by Major General Uzal Girard Ent who became the Commanding General after having been the Chief of Staff. Ent retired due to disability in the line of duty, due to injuries he sustained in a B-25 crash in October 1944 during takeoff. He died on 5 March 1948. Major General Robert B. Williams became the commanding officer of the Second Air Force in October 1944; he retired 1 July 1946.

The facility became inactive when the 15th Air Force headquarters was assigned to March Air Force Base in November 1949. There were discussions about the city taking over the now unused property, but in November 1950, it was announced that the base was to become the headquarters for the Air Defense Command.

== Air Force Base ==
=== Air Defense Command ===
On 1 January 1951, the Air Defense Command was reestablished at Mitchel Air Force Base, under the command of Commanding General Ennis Whitehead, later lieutenant general. (Note: The Air Force biography for Whitehead states that his command started 8 January 1951.) One week later the command was moved to Colorado Springs. The Ent Air Force Base, named for Major General Uzal Girard Ent, opened on 8 January 1951. The Air Defense Command (ADC) inherited 21 fighter squadrons from Continental Air Command (CONAD) and 37 Air National Guard (ANG) fighter squadrons assigned an M-Day air defense mission. It was also assigned four Air Divisions (Defense). General Benjamin W. Chidlaw was the base commander beginning 29 July 1951 and commander of the Air Defense Command from 25 August 1951 and until 31 May 1955.

The Senate appropriated an additional $3 million for expansion of the base in September 1951. The Peterson Air Force Base, which became inactive in 1949 when the 15th Air Force was moved to the March Air Force Base, was activated when the Ent Air Force Base opened. At the same time, the 4600th Air Base Group was activated to provide support for Ent. The funding was part of a military expansion initiative for the Ent Air Force Base, Fort Carson, and Peterson Air Force Base, all in Colorado Springs, Colorado. Much of the construction at Ent was for additional residential facilities. The Air Defense Command began 24-hour Ground Observer Corps operations on 14 July 1952. Starting September 1953, the base was the headquarters for the Army Anti-Aircraft Command.

Information about potential hostile aircraft from radar sites around the country was forwarded to a regional clearinghouse, like Otis Air National Guard Base, and then to ADC headquarters at Ent Air Force Base. It was then plotted on the world's largest Plexiglas board. Enemy bombers progress was tracked on the board using grease pencils. If there was a potential threat, interceptor aircraft were scrambled to the target. Because this process was cumbersome, it made a rapid response unattainable. An automated command and control system, Semi-Automatic Ground Environment (SAGE), based upon the Whirlwind II (AN/FSQ-7) computer was implemented to process ground radar and other sources for an immediate view of potential threats in the 1950s. There was an operational plan for a SAGE implementation for Ent by 7 March 1955.

A modern 15,000 square feet (1,400 m^{2}) concrete block Combat Operations Center (COC) became operational at the base on 15 May 1954. (Note: Although the new facility was much improved over the previous center, General Partridge was not satisfied that it would survive a nuclear bomb.) 1 September of that year, the Continental Air Defense Command (CONAD) was activated as a joint command at Ent AFB:

- Air Defense Command was the United States Air Force component command
- Army Antiaircraft Command was the Army component
- Naval Forces CONAD was the Navy component (NAVFORCONAD), established at Ent. CONAD forces were committed to the Contiguous Radar Coverage System and of augmentation forces for all services made available during emergency periods.

The Colorado Springs Chamber of Commerce purchased 8.1 acres of land and donated it to the Ent Air Force Base, making it a permanent installation on 31 July 1954. In September of that year, the base became the headquarters of Continental Air Defense Command. More than $19 million was targeted in 1955 for further military expansion in the area, including the Fort Carson, the Ent Air Force Base, and the development of the Air Force Academy.

On 15 January 1956, General Earle E. Partridge, CINCONAD, directed his staff to begin preliminary planning for a Combat Operations Center to be located underground. Partridge believed his present above ground center, located on Ent Air Force Base was too small to manage the growing air defense system and was highly vulnerable to sabotage or attack. Partridge was made commander in 1955, was the driving force behind the creation of the Cheyenne Mountain Air Force Station. He requested an underground facility in December 1956.

Continental Air Command (CONAD) and the Air Defense Command (ADC) formally separated in 1956. Partridge was relieved of his command of CONAD and Lt. General Joseph H. Atkinson assumed control of ADC.

The Interceptor magazine was produced by the Air Defense Command at the Ent Air Force Base by 1959 and then the Aerospace Defense Command into the mid-1970s.

=== NORAD ===
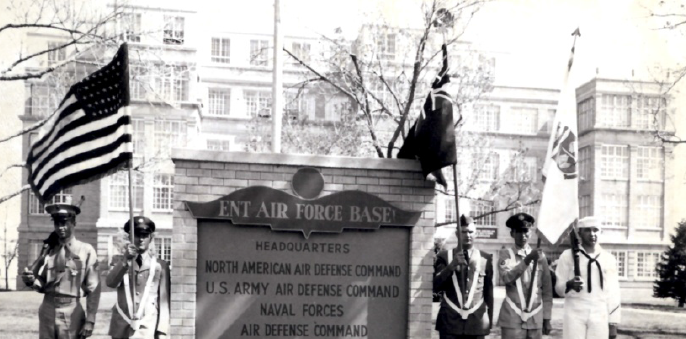
Ent Air Force Base, 1958

The North American Air Defense Command (NORAD) was established and activated at the base on 12 September 1957. This command is an international organization, taking operational control of Canadian Air Defense Command air defense units and United States Air Defense Command air defense units. The first NORAD Agreement was drafted. Partridge was Commander-in-Chief, CONAD also became commander of NORAD. Royal Canadian Air Force Air Marshal Roy Slemon became deputy commander, NORAD. The official agreement between the two countries was signed 12 May 1958.

In 1958, the base put $36,904,558 into the Colorado Springs economy in the form of pay to 3,639 military and 1,222 civilian personnel and dependents allowances, which was more than $7 million more than the previous year. These numbers exclude individuals that work for 15 U.S. industries—such as Boeing and Lockheed Aircraft—on Ent. Due to improvements in radar technology, the Ground Observer Corps was inactivated on 31 July 1959.

The NORAD commander issued instructions on 21 April 1961, concerning the 425L command and control computer system operational philosophy, including use by NORAD and component personnel, NORAD entry to sufficiently enable him to evaluate indications presented, the requirements for human judgment in determining the validity of individual system indications, and identification of data as to source system.

=== Cheyenne Mountain transition ===
Excavation began for NORAD Command Operations Center (COC) in Cheyenne Mountain on 18 May 1961. The official ground breaking ceremony was held 16 June 1961 at the construction site of the new NORAD Combat Operations Center. Generals Lee (ADC) and Laurence S. Kuter (NORAD) simultaneously set off symbolic dynamite charges. Estimated cost of the combat operations center construction and equipment was $66 million. (Note: The Headquarters NORAD Locations were: Ent Air Force Base, CO September 1957 – March 1963; Chidlaw Building, Colorado Springs, CO March 1963 – January 1988; Building 1470, Peterson Air Force Base, CO January 1988 – March 2003; Building 2, Peterson Air Force Base, CO March 2003 – October 2012; Eberhart-Findley Building, Peterson Air Force Base, CO (ex-Building 2) Beginning October 2012.)

=== Ent Annex ===
The 9th Aerospace Defense Division was activated at Ent Air Force Base on 15 July 1961. It was the first large military space organization in the western world. The first Aerospace Surveillance and Control Squadron were assigned to the 9 ADD.

The Air Defense Command's SPACETRACK Center and NORAD's Space Detection and Tracking System (SPADATS) Center merged to form the Space Defense Center. It was moved from Ent AFB to the newly completed Cheyenne Mountain Combat Operations Center and was activated on 3 September 1965.

A Major General was assigned as the first Director of the Combat Operations Center as recommended by the Cheyenne Mountain Complex Task Force Study Report on 1 October 1965. This established a separate Battle Staff organization. The Director was responsible directly to CINCNORAD for tactical matters and the Joint Chiefs of Staff for all others. CINCNORAD transferred Combat Operations Center operations from Ent Air Force Base to Cheyenne Mountain and declared the 425L command and control system fully operational 20 April 1966. On 20 May 1966, the NORAD Attack Warning System became operational. The Space Defense Center and the Combat Operations Center achieved Full Operational Capability on 6 February 1967. The total cost was $142.4 million.

The Fourteenth Aerospace Force was activated on 1 Jul 1968, at Ent AFB, Colorado. It inherited the staff and mission of the 9th Aerospace Defense Division, which was discontinued. The First Aerospace Control Squadron was then reassigned to the 14th Aerospace Force.

The Air Defense Command was re-designated as the Aerospace Defense Command on 15 January 1968. The Continental Air Defense Command and Aerospace Defense Command headquarters began consolidation and streamlining on 1 July 1973. (Note: In 1972 a proposal was made for appropriation for the construction of a 9-hole golf course and snack bar on Ent Air Force Base, which was on Peterson Field (now Peterson Air Force Base). The Silver Spruce Golf Course on the Peterson Air Force Base (east of the Ent Air Force Base) was built in 1973.)

The Department of Defense announced plans for cutbacks in air defense forces showing increasing emphasis on ballistic missile attack warning and decreasing emphasis on bomber defense on 4 February 1974. The Continental Air Defense Command de-established on 30 June 1974.

== Inactivation ==
The US Army Air Defense command, a component command of the North American Air Defense Command and Continental Air Command, was inactivated at Ent AFB, Colorado on 4 January 1975.

The 14th Aerospace Force, Ent AFB, Colorado was inactivated and its personnel and units (missile and space surveillance) were reassigned to HQ ADCOM and ADCOM divisions and the Alaskan ADCOM Region on 1 October 1976. Ent Air Force Base was declared excess. In December 1976, personnel were moved to Peterson Air Force Base and the Chidlaw Building, near downtown Colorado Springs. The Aerospace Defense Command was inactivated on 31 March 1980.

== Units ==
United States
Unit	Command	Start	End	Comments
ADC Headquarters	Air Defense Command / Aerospace Defense Command	1951-01		The United States Air Force Air Defense Command (ADC) was established as a major command with the sole mission of air defense of the continental United States. Headquarter opened at Colorado Springs, Colorado, on 8 January, 51 under the command of Lieutenant General Ennis Whitehead.
ARAACOM Headquarters	Army Antiaircraft Command	1951-01	1957-03	On 15 January 1951, the Army Antiaircraft Command (ARAACOM) moved its headquarters to Colorado Springs to operate alongside the USAF ADC. Subsequently, on 10 April 1951, all Army Antiaircraft (AA) units in the continental United States were allocated to the Army Antiaircraft Command. At that time there were 23 AA battalions. ARAACOM was redesignated the U. S. Army Air Defense Command (ARADCOM) on 21 March 1957.
CONAD Headquarters	Continental Air Defense Command	1954-09		The Joint Chiefs of Staff established the Continental Air Defense Command (CONAD) with headquarters at Ent Air Force Base, Colorado Springs, Colorado, under the command of General Benjamin W. Chidlaw.
NORAD Headquarters	North American Air Defense Command	1957-09	1963-03	North American Air Defense Command (NORAD) was established on Ent Air Force Base on 12 September 1957. It exercised operational control over Canadian and US air defense forces in Canada through the AOC, Canadian Air Defence Command, and over all other us· air defense forces in continental United States, Alaska, and Greenland. NORAD Headquarters moved to the Chidlaw Building in March 1963.
4th Weather Wing	Air Weather Service for Air Defense Command			The 4th was stationed at Ent in 1954 1965, 1967, and 1970.
9th Space Division	Air Defense Command / Aerospace Defense Command	1961-07	1968-07	On 15 July 1961 the 9th Aerospace Division was stationed at Ent. Assigned to the Aerospace Defense Command, the 9th Aerospace Division assumed responsibility for the Ballistic Missile Early Warning System, the Missile Defense Alarm System, the Space Detection and Tracking System, the North American Air Defense Command (NORAD) Combat operations Center, the Bomb Alarm System, and the Nuclear Detonation System from 1961 to 1968. Within the division was the 1 Space Operations Squadron (AFSPC), 2 Space Operations Squadron (AFSPC), and the 71 Flying Training Wing. The Division received the Air Force Outstanding Unit Award from 1 January 1966 to 31 December 1967. It was inactivated and discontinued on 1 July 1968.
14th Air Force	Air Defense Command / Aerospace Defense Command	1968-07	1976-10	Responsibilities included air defense, including detection of missile launches, identifying and tracking satellites, providing space vehicle launch services, and performing anti-satellite actions. It also maintained space monitoring, defense and warning systems. Also, 14th Aerospace Force It was located in the Burrows Building. The 73rd Space Group was a component of the 14th.
15th Air Force	Strategic Air Command	1946-03	1949-11	The 15th Air Force was activated on 31 March 1946 and assigned to the Strategic Air Command in Colorado Springs, Colorado. It was assigned to the March Air Force Base on 7 November 1949. Colorado Springs Tent Camp was left vacant when the 15th was reassigned to another base in November 1949.
46 Aerospace Defense Wing	Aerospace Defense Command	1975-03	1976-12 (est) (Note: Estimate that its responsibilities regarding the buildings ended when all staff was removed from the buildings in December 1976, or soon after.)	The unit was established on 10 February 1975 and assigned to the Aerospace Defense Command on 15 March 1975 on Peterson Field, later Peterson Air Force Base. Replacing the 4600 Air Base Wing in March 1975, it took over the mission of administering facilities of North American Air Defense Command (NORAD), Air Defense Command (ADC), and Army Air Defense Command (ARADCOM) located on Ent AFB, Peterson Field (later, AFB), and Cheyenne Mountain Complex, and other nearby off-base facilities. It received Air Force Outstanding Unit Awards from 1 July 1975 to 30 June 1977 and from 1 July 1977 to 30 June 1979.
47th Communication Group			1971-10	The group was stationed at the base by 1963 and was assigned to Peterson Air Force Base on 22 October 1971.
615 Infirmary / 615 Dispensary		1951		The Infirmary was at the base in 1951 and the Dispensary was on the base in 1958.
1151st Special Activities Squad				The squad was at the base in 1967.
4600th Air Base Group units		1951-01	1975-04	The 4600th Air Base Group activated with Peterson Field on 1 January 1951 and provided support for the newly established command. In 1958 the 4600th achieved wing status and was designated as the 4600th Air Base Wing. The 4604th and 4608th Support Groups was at the base in 1967. On 1 April 1975, the Air Force redesignated the wing as the 46th Aerospace Defense Wing.
Electronic Systems Division Detachment 10	Air Force Systems Command	1963-04	1964-07	The Electronics Systems Division was established and organized on 1 April 1961. Electronic Systems Division Field Office 2 was formed on 9 September 1961. The 425L SPO (NORAD Combat Operations Center) subelement at Ent Air Force Base, Colorado (ESD Field Office 2), became ESD Detachment 10 on 1 April 1963. Detachment 10 was assigned to Cheyenne Mountain Complex Management and assumed the remaining responsibilities and most of the personnel of the 425L (NORAD Combat Operations Center) SPO and assumed responsibilities in connection with BMEWS, Space Track, SAGE, and BUIC.

Canada
Unit	Command	Start	End	Comments
Canadian Force Support Unit				The Canadian Force Support Unit was stationed at the base in 1971.

== See also ==
- Ent Federal Credit Union, which opened on the base in 1957.
- Former buildings
  - Federal Building (Colorado Springs)
  - Chidlaw Building
