= Space Defense Center =

Former space operation center

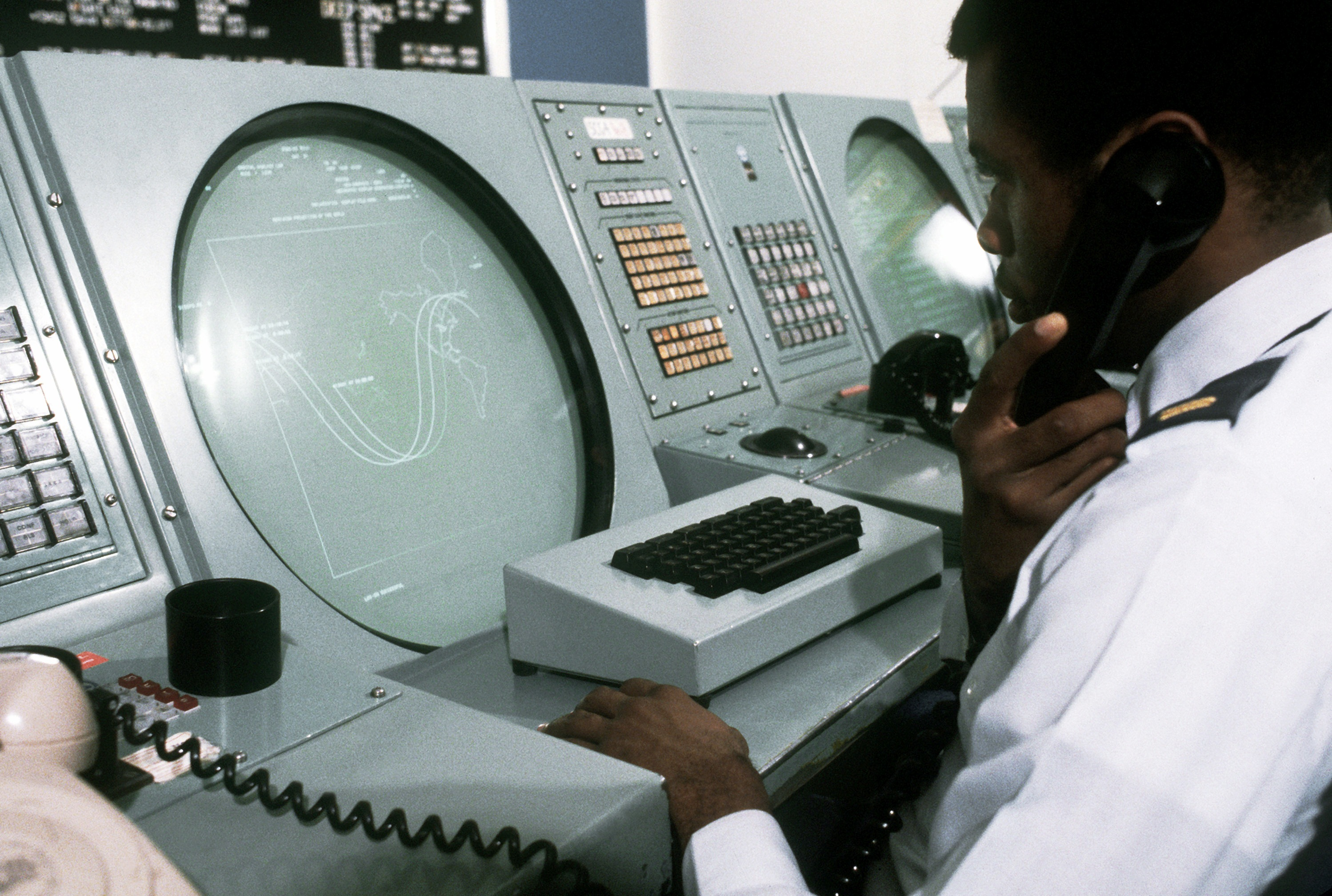
An orbital analyst tracks Kosmos 1402 in 1983.

The Space Defense Center (SDC) was a space operation center of the North American Aerospace Defense Command. It was successively housed at two Colorado locations, Ent Air Force Base, followed by Cheyenne Mountain's Group III Space Defense Center The 1st Aerospace Control Squadron manned the SDC at both locations, which used the Electronic Systems Division's 496L System for processing and displaying data combined from the U.S. "Air Force's Space Track and the Navy's Spasur" (NAVSPASUR).

The photo is of a console introduced for the 427M system, the 496L inputs were only card readers and paper tape readers, the only output was from two large line printers.

== History ==
The initial 496L System was at Hanscom Field's National Space Surveillance Control Center and the second was installed at Ent Air Force Base's Space Defense Center. The Ent SDC was one of several facilities providing data to the Cheyenne Mountain Combat Operation Center when the nuclear bunker achieved full operational capability on July 1, 1966.

The SDC's approximately $5-million Delta I computer system at Cheyenne Mountain became operational on October 28, 1966, with about 53 individual computer programs totaling 345,000 instructions. The Space Defense Center mission moved from Ent Air Force Base to "adjacent to the NORAD command center" in Cheyenne Mountain on February 6, 1967.

The NORAD Cheyenne Mountain Complex Improvements Program (ESD program $427M contracted in 1972, operational in 1979) included the Space Computational Center (SCC)" intended to replace the Space Defense Center (the 1979 Space Defense Operations Center (SPADOC) was for "replacing the SDC [sic] in Cheyenne Mountain during October.")

The Space Computational Center (using the 427M computer system) replaced the Space Defense Center (which used the 496L computer system) and the SDC was closed.

== See also ==
- National Space Defense Center
