= Space Detection and Tracking System =

The Space Detection and Tracking System (SPADATS), was built by the United States Department of Defense (Note: The current administration styles the Department as the "Department of War.".) in 1960 to integrate defense systems built by different branches of the United States Armed Forces and was placed under North American Aerospace Defense Command (NORAD). The United States Air Force had a program called Spacetrack, and was a network of space-probing cameras and radar. The United States Navy had a system called SPASUR, a space surveillance system that was "an electronic fence" the protected the southern United States.

SPADATS was developed by the SpaceTrack Research and Development Facility, also called the 496L System Program Office, at Hanscom Field in Bedford, Massachusetts. (Bendix, Sperry Rand and Hughes competed for SPADATS contract in the early 1962 on the basis of their prior experience in phased array technology.) It first operated at the Electronic Systems Command building at Hanscom and in 1963 was transferred to the Ent Air Force Base and then to the Cheyenne Mountain Complex in El Paso County, Colorado in 1965 or 1966. From that point, the SpaceTrack Research and Development Facility continued to build and test new software, manage contracts for hardware and software, and operate as a backup facility. SPADATS was developed in assembly language and the hardware at all three locations was Philco 2000/Model 212 large scale transistor computers. Spiral Decay, a Special Perturbation Program, was used to model the motion of space objects re-entering the Earth's atmosphere. Project 437 used a second Special Perturbation Program called ESPOD.

SPADATS remained operational until around 1980 at the Cheyenne Mountain Complex. Some of its logic, though continued on in Space Defense Operations Center (SPADOC) systems.
