= United States Space Surveillance Network =

SSA system

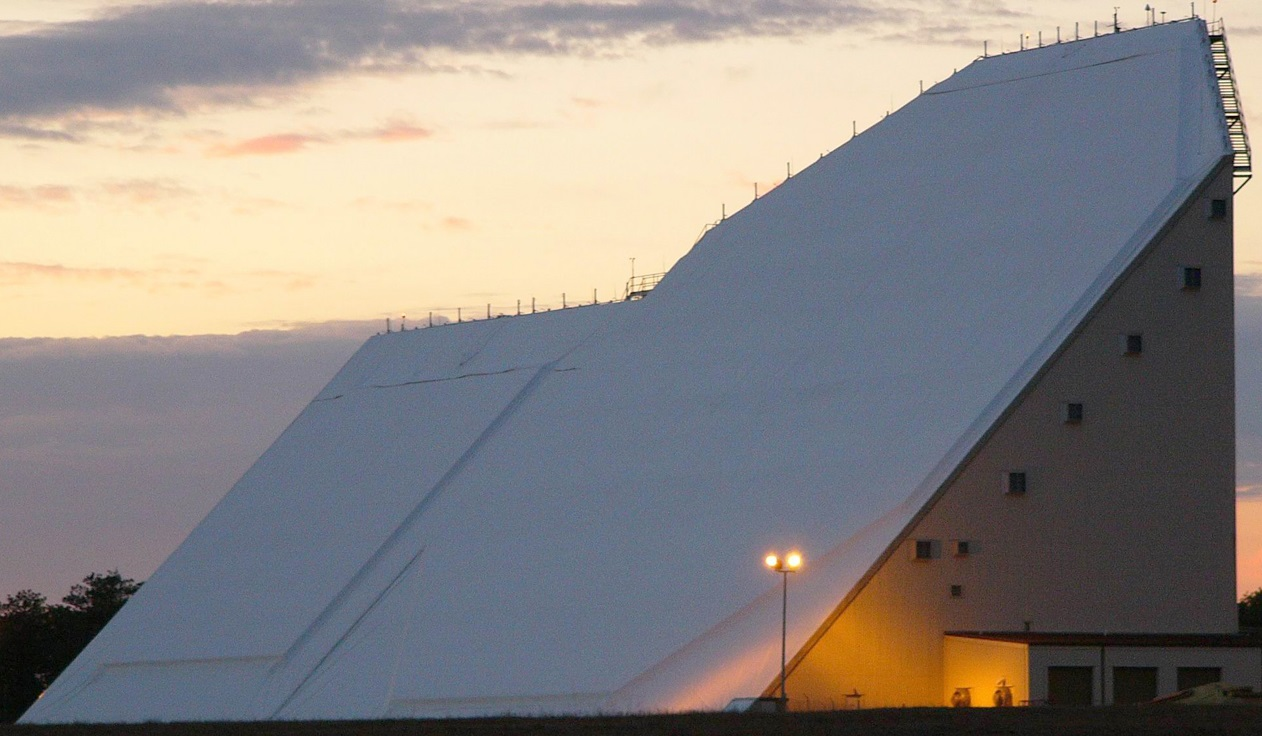
SSN phased-array radar at Eglin AFB

The United States Space Surveillance Network (SSN) detects, tracks, identifies, and catalogs artificial objects orbiting Earth. Examples include satellites, abandoned launch vehicle stages, and other space debris. The SSN is the responsibility of United States Space Command and is operated by the United States Space Force. Its functions include:

- Predict when and where a decaying space object will re-enter the Earth's atmosphere;
- Prevent a returning space object, which to radar looks like a missile, from triggering a false alarm in missile-attack warning sensors of the U.S. and other countries;
- Chart the present position of space objects and plot their anticipated orbital paths;
- Detect new artificial objects in space;
- Map objects traveling in Earth orbit;
- Produce a running catalog of artificial space objects;
- Determine ownership of a re-entering space object;
- Command and control of future U.S. anti-satellite weapon (ASAT) systems.

The SSN includes dedicated, collateral, and contributing electro-optical, passive radio frequency (RF) and radar sensors. It provides space object cataloging and identification, satellite attack warning, timely notification to U.S. forces of satellite fly-over, space treaty monitoring, and scientific and technical intelligence gathering. The continued increase in satellite and orbital debris populations, as well as the increasing diversity in launch trajectories, non-standard orbits, and geosynchronous altitudes, necessitates continued modernization of the SSN to meet existing and future requirements and ensure their cost-effective supportability.

== History ==
=== 1957–1963 ===
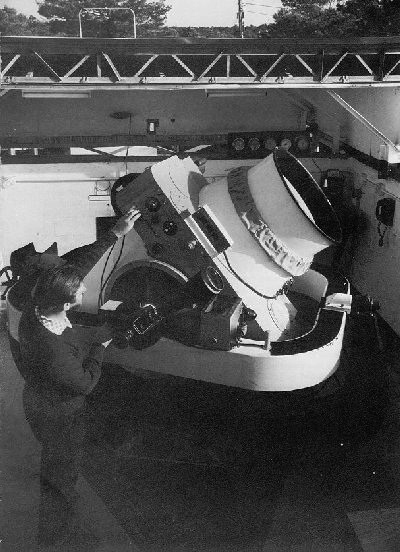
Baker–Nunn satellite tracking camera

The first formalized effort by the US government to catalog satellites occurred under Project Space Track, established in 1957 at Hanscom Field in Bedford, Massachusetts, and moved to a dedicated building, the National Space Surveillance Control Center (NSSCC), in late 1959. The procedures used at the NSSCC were first reported in 1959 and 1960 by Wahl, who was the technical director of the NSSCC. In 1960, under Project Space Track, Fitzpatrick and Findley developed detailed documentation of the procedures used at the NSSCC.

Early Space Track observations of satellites were collected at more than 150 individual sites, including radar stations, Baker–Nunn cameras, telescopes, radio receivers, and by citizens participating in the Operation Moonwatch program. Individuals at these Moonwatch sites recorded satellite observations visually, but there were numerous observation types and sources, some automated, others only semi-automated. The observations were transferred to the NSSCC by teletype, telephone, mail, and personal messenger. There, a duty analyst reduced the data and determined corrections that should be made to the orbital elements before they were used for further predictions. After this analysis, the corrections were fed into an IBM 709 computer that computed the updated orbital data. The updated orbital data were then used in another phase of the same computer program to yield the geocentric ephemeris. From the geocentric ephemeris, three different products were computed and sent back to the observing stations for their planning of future observing opportunities.

=== Missile Warning and Space Surveillance in the Eisenhower Years ===
The launch of Sputnik 1 by the Soviet Union led to a US government-perceived need to better track objects in space using the Space Tracking System. The first US system, Minitrack, was already in existence at the time of the Sputnik launch, but the US quickly discovered that Minitrack could not reliably detect and track satellites. The US Navy designed Minitrack to track the Vanguard satellite, and so long as satellites adhered to the international agreement on satellite transmission frequencies, Minitrack could track any satellite. However, the Soviets chose not to use the international satellite frequencies. Thus, a major limitation of this system became visible. Minitrack could not detect or track an uncooperative or passive satellite.

Concurrent with Minitrack was the use of the Baker-Nunn satellite tracking cameras. These systems used modified Schmidt telescopes of great resolution to photograph and identify objects in space. The cameras first became operational in 1958 and eventually operated at sites worldwide. At their peak, the Air Force ran five sites, the Royal Canadian Air Force ran two, and the Smithsonian Institution's Astrophysics Observatory operated a further eight sites. The Baker-Nunn system, like Minitrack, provided little real-time data and was limited to night-time, clear weather operations.

Beyond the problems in acquiring data on satellites, it became obvious that the US tracking network would soon be overwhelmed by the tremendous number of satellites that followed Sputnik and Vanguard. The amount of satellite tracking data accumulated required creation or expansion of organizations and equipment to sift through and catalog the objects. The need for real-time detection and tracking information to deal with Soviet satellite launches led on 19 December 1958 to ARPA's implementation of Executive Order 50-59 to establish a spacetrack network. This spacetrack network, Project Shepherd, began with the Space Track Filter Center at Bedford, Massachusetts, and an operational space defense network (i.e., a missile-warning network). ARDC took up the spacetrack mission in late 1959 and in April 1960 set up the Interim National Space Surveillance Control Center at Hanscom Field, Massachusetts, to coordinate observations and maintain satellite data. At the same time, DOD designated the Aerospace Defense Command (ADCOM), formerly Air Defense Command, as the prime user of spacetrack data. ADCOM formulated the first US plans for space surveillance.

During the period that intercontinental ballistic missiles were being developed as frontline weapon systems, numerous missile detection and warning sensors were fielded as operational sensors. Most of these contributed satellite observation data at one time or another. Among these were detection and tracking radars in Trinidad Laredo, Texas, Moorestown, New Jersey, Kaena Point, Antigua, Ascension Island, Naval Station San Miguel, and Kwajalein Atoll, the three BMEWS sites, the Pave Paws sites, the AN/FSS-7 missile warning radar sites, the passive electronically scanned array sites, Cavalier, ND, Eglin, FL, Maui Space Surveillance Complex, Globus II, San Vito dei Normanni Air Station, TOS/CROSS, and MIT Lincoln Laboratory.

=== Air Force Space Surveillance System ===
The Air Force Space Surveillance System (AFSSS) was a very high frequency radar network located at sites across the southern United States with a centralized data-processing site at the Naval Space Command in Dahlgren, Virginia. AFSSS began as the U.S. Navy Space Surveillance System (NSSS) in 1961. The system detected space objects from new launches, maneuvers of existing objects, breakups of existing objects, and provided data to users from its catalog of space objects. Orbital parameters of more than 10,000 objects were maintained in this catalog—which has now gained usage by NASA, weather agencies, and friendly foreign agencies. The information is essential to computing the collision avoidance information to de-conflict launch windows with known orbiting space objects.

NSSS was transferred to the Air Force in 2004 and renamed AFSSS. It was operated by the 20th Space Surveillance Squadron, Detachment 1. The 21st Space Wing closed the Air Force Space Surveillance System on 1 October 2013, citing resource constraints caused by sequestration. A new S-band Space Fence is under construction at Kwajalein Atoll.

== US Space Catalog ==
Since 1957, the United States Department of Defense (DoD) has maintained a database of satellites states known as the Space Object Catalog or simply the Space Catalog. Starting with the launch of Sputnik 1 as the second database entry and its booster listed as the first database entry. These satellite states are regularly updated with observations from the Space Surveillance Network, a globally distributed network of interferometer, radar and optical tracking systems. By the year 2024, the number of cataloged objects was past 31,000.

Different astrodynamics theories are used to maintain these catalogs. The General Perturbations (GP) theory provides a general analytical solution of the satellite equations of motion. The orbital elements and their associated partial derivatives are expressed as series expansions in terms of the initial conditions of these differential equations. The GP theories operated efficiently on the earliest electronic computing machines, and were therefore adopted as the primary theory for Space Catalog orbit determination. Assumptions must be made to simplify these analytical theories, such as truncation of the Earth's gravitational potential to a few zonal harmonic terms. The atmosphere is usually modeled as a static, spherical density field that exponentially decays. Third body influences and resonance effects are partially modeled. Increased accuracy of GP theory usually requires significant development efforts.

NASA maintains civilian databases of GP orbital elements, also known as NASA or NORAD two-line elements. The GP element sets are "mean" element sets that have specific periodic features removed to enhance long-term prediction performance, and require special software to reconstruct the compressed trajectory.

== Shemya and Diyarbakir Radar Sites ==
AN/FPS-17 and AN/FPS-80 radars were placed at Shemya Island in the Aleutian Islands off the Alaskan coast in the 1960s to track Soviet missile tests and to support the Air Force Spacetrack System. In July 1973, Raytheon won a contract to build a system called "Cobra Dane" on Shemya. Designated as the AN/FPS-108, Cobra Dane replaced AN/FPS-17 and AN/FPS-80 radars. Becoming operational in 1977, Cobra Dane also had a primary mission of monitoring Soviet tests of missiles launched from southwest Russia aimed at the Siberian Kamchatka peninsula. This large, single-faced, phased-array radar was the most powerful ever built.

The FPS-80 was a tracking radar and the FPS-17 was a detection radar for Soviet missiles. Both were part of the Ballistic Missile Early Warning System (BMEWS). The large detection radar (AN/FPS-17) went into operation in 1960. In 1961, the AN/FPS-80 tracking radar was constructed nearby. These radars were closed in the 1970s.

The Diyarbakır Air Station intelligence collection radar site ultimately consisted of one detection radar (FPS-17) and one mechanical tracking radar (FPS-79). The Pirinclik radars were operated by the 19th Surveillance Squadron. The FPS-17 radar reached initial operational capability (IOC) on 1 June 1955 and the FPS-79 in 1964. Both radars operated at a UHF (432 MHz) frequency. Although limited by their mechanical technology, Pirinclik's two radars gave the advantage of tracking two objects simultaneously in real time. Its location close to the southern Former Soviet Union made it the only ground sensor capable of tracking actual deorbits of Russian space objects. In addition, the Pirinclik radar was the only 24-hour-per-day eastern hemisphere deep space sensor. Radar operations at Pirinclik were terminated in March 1997.

=== AN/FPS-17 ===
With the Soviet Union apparently making rapid progress in its rocket program, in 1954 the United States began a program to develop a long range surveillance radar. General Electric Heavy Military Electronics Division (HMED) in Syracuse, NY was the prime contractor and Lincoln Laboratory was a subcontractor. This detection radar, the AN/FPS-17, was conceived, designed, built, and installed for operation in nine months. The first installation, designated AN/FPS-17(XW-1) was at Diyarbakir (Pirinclik), Turkey, to detect Soviet launches. A second system, designated AN/FPS-17(XW-2), was installed at Laredo AFS (about 7 miles (11 km) northeast of Laredo AFB) in Texas, to track rockets launched from White Sands, New Mexico, and serve as a radar test bed. A third system, designated AN/FPS-17(XW-3), was installed on Shemya Island, Alaska, to detect Soviet launches. The Diyarbakir FPS-17 became operational in June 1955, the Laredo installation in February 1956, and Shemya in May 1960. The first two installations closed without replacements; the Shemya installation was replaced by the Cobra Dane (AN/FPS-108) radar.

The FPS-17 antenna featured a fixed parabolic torus section reflector that typically stood 175 feet (53 m) high and 110 feet (34 m) wide and was illuminated by an array of radar feed horns placed in front of it. The transmitters operated in the VHF band, sending out pulses at frequencies between approximately 180 to 220 MHz. The FPS-17 was unique in that, unlike most radar types, each site's version differed from the other sites. Differences included transmitter equipment, reflector size and number, and the number and arrangement of feed horns. Additionally, the FPS-17 was the first operational radar system to employ pulse compression techniques. There were two AN/FPS-17 antennas at Diyarbakir, Turkey, one antenna at Laredo, and three at Shemya in the Aleutians.

=== AN/FPS-79 ===
The original FPS-79 antenna at Diyarbakir had a unique feature which enhanced its Spacetrack usefulness. A variable-focus feed horn provided a wide beam for detection and a narrow beamwidth for tracking. That antenna was replaced by a new antenna and pedestal in 1975. Pulse compression was used to improve both the gain and resolution of the 35-foot (11 m) dish antenna. Steering was mechanical; the FPS-79 had a range of 24,000 miles (39,000 km). The radar site closed in 1997.

After circling the Earth in an apparently dormant state for 9 months, on November 13, 1986, the SPOT 1 Ariane third stage violently separated into some 465 detectable fragments - the most severe satellite breakup yet recorded prior to 2007.

Although the debris cloud did not pass over the continental United States until more than 8 hours later, personnel in the Space Surveillance Center (SSC) at the Cheyenne Mountain Complex in Colorado Springs, Colorado reported that the U.S. FPS-79 radar at Pirinclik, Turkey, noticed the debris within minutes of the fragmentation.

=== Blue Nine and Blue Fox ===
Blue Nine refers to a project which produced the AN/FPS-79 Tracking Radar Set built by General Electric, used with the 466L Electromagnetic Intelligence System (ELINT); US Air Force. Blue Fox refers to a modification of the AN/FPS-80 tracking radar to the AN/FPS-80(M) configuration. Shemya, AK, 1964. Both of these systems incorporated GE M236 computers.

=== AN/FPS-80 ===
A 60-foot dish mechanical tracking radar built by General Electric. Deployed at Shemya Island, Alaska, as a UHF radar and upgraded to L-Band in 1964. Used as tracker radar for Spacetrack network measurements once target detected. Principally used for intelligence purposes to track Russian missiles. The advanced FPS-108 Cobra Dane phased array radar replaced the FPS-17 and FPS-80 radars in 1977.

== Space Surveillance Network ==
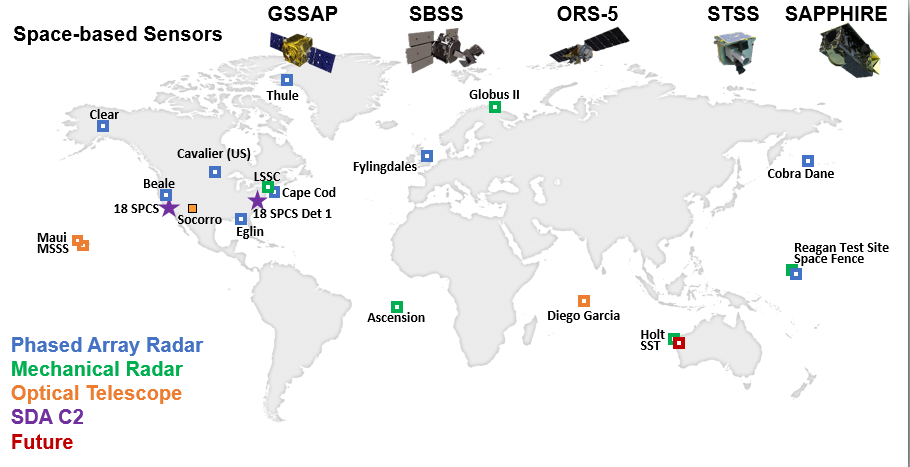
The Space Surveillance Network

The command accomplishes these tasks through its Space Surveillance Network (SSN) of U.S. Army, Navy and Space Force operated, 30+ ground-based radars and optical telescopes worldwide, plus 6 satellites in orbit.

As of June 23, 2019, the catalog built using SSN data listed 44,336 objects including 8,558 satellites launched into orbit since 1957. 17,480 of them were actively tracked while 1,335 were lost. The rest have re-entered Earth's turbulent atmosphere and disintegrated, or survived re-entry and impacted the Earth. The SSN typically tracks space objects which are 10 centimeters in diameter (baseball size) or larger.

The Space Surveillance Network has numerous sensors that provide data. They are separated in three categories: dedicated sensors, collateral sensors and auxiliary sensors. Both the dedicated and collateral sensors are operated by the USSPACECOM, but while the former have a primary objective to acquire SSN data, the latter obtain SSN data as a secondary objective. The auxiliary sensors are not operated by the USSPACECOM and usually perform space surveillance collaterally. Additionally sensors are classified as Near-Earth (NE) tracking - observing satellites, space debris and other objects in lower orbits, or Deep Space (DS) - generally for asteroids and comets.

- Dedicated sensors
  - Ground-based Electro-Optical Deep Space Surveillance (GEODSS) sites
  - Space Surveillance Telescope (SST)
  - MOSS - an Electro-Optical (E-O) surveillance system located at the Morón Air Base, Spain
  - GLOBUS II radar
  - AN/FPS-85 Space Track Radar
  - AN/FPS-133 Air Force Space Surveillance System, also known as the Space Fence and its replacement Space Fence
  - Midcourse Space Experiment (MSX) / Space Based Visible (SBV) satellites
- Collateral sensors
  - Maui Space Surveillance Complex and Advanced Electro-Optical System (AEOS) telescope, co-located with a GEODSS station in Maui, Hawaii
  - Haystack Ultrawideband Satellite Imaging Radar (HUSIR), Haystack Auxiliary Radar (HAX) and Millstone Hill Radar
  - ALTAIR and ALCOR radars at the Ronald Reagan Ballistic Missile Defense Test Site, Kwajalein Atoll
  - Ascension Range Radar, locate at the Eastern Spacelift Range
  - Ground-Based Radar Prototype (GBR-P), located Ronald Reagan Ballistic Missile Defense Test Site, Kwajalein Atoll
- Auxiliary sensors
  - Solid State Phased Array Radar System (SSPARS) / AN/FPS-132 Upgraded Early Warning Radar (UEWR) system of system, deployed at multiple sites
  - AN/FPS-108 Cobra Dane
  - AN/FPQ-16 Perimeter Acquisition Radar Characterization System (PARCS)

== Ground-based Electro-Optical Deep Space Surveillance ==
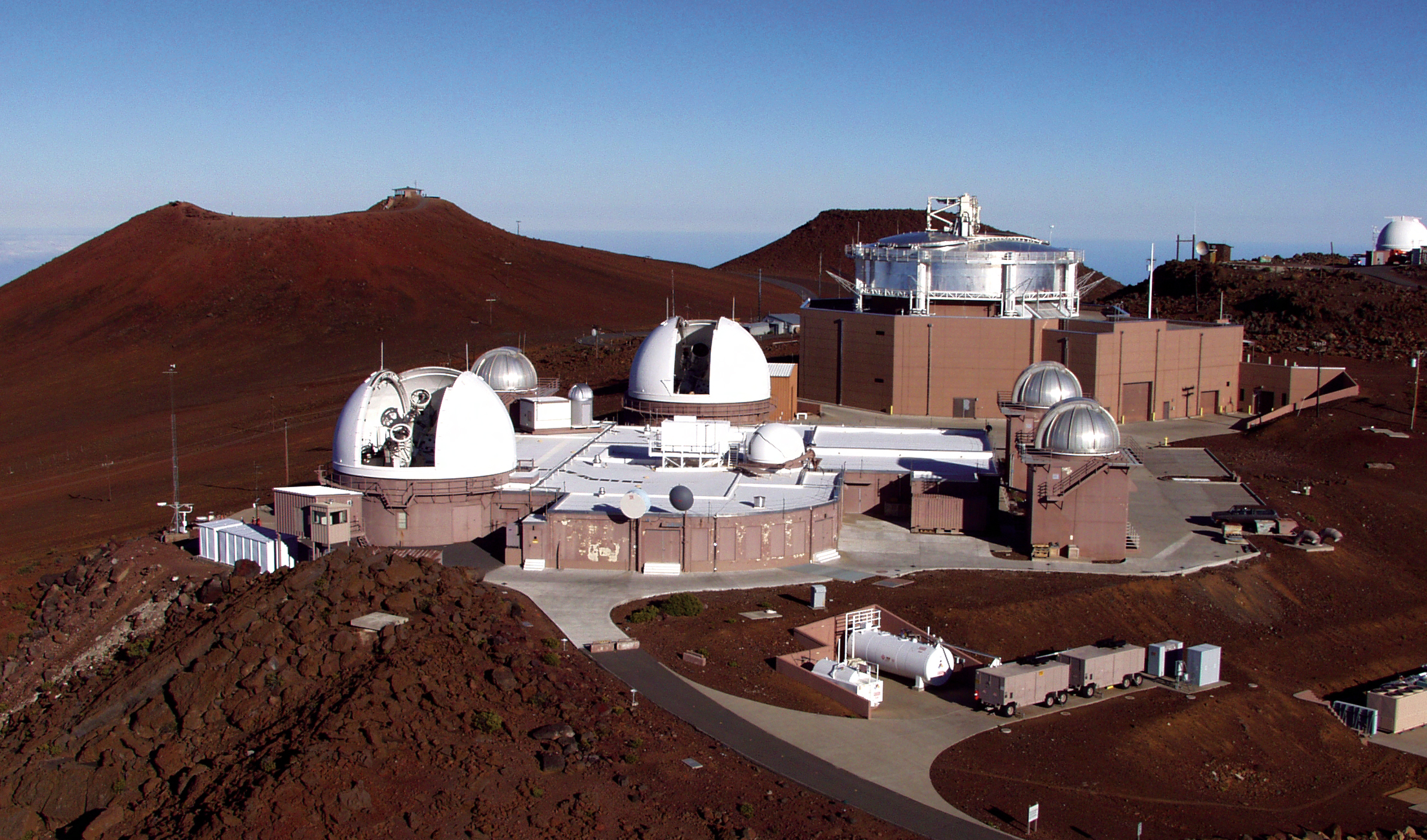
GEODSS atop the Haleakala crater

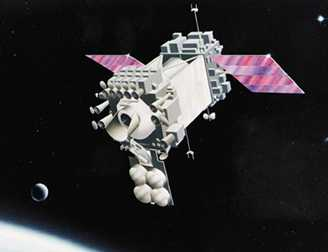
Midcourse Space Experiment

Ground-based Electro-Optical Deep Space Surveillance, or GEODSS, is a network consisting of optical telescopes, low light level television cameras, and computers. It replaced an older system of six 20-inch (510 mm) Baker-Nunn cameras which used photographic film. The GEODSS network detects and tracks the positions of objects in medium Earth orbit (MEO) and high Earth orbit (HEO), or from about 2,000 kilometers (1,200 mi) to more than 35,780 kilometers (22,230 mi), beyond geosynchronous altitudes. The system operates passively by detecting sunlight reflected off artificial objects against the night sky background.

There are currently three operational GEODSS sites, all reporting to the 15th Space Surveillance Squadron:

- 15th Space Surveillance Squadron, Detachment 1 (15 SPSS, Det. 1): White Sands Missile Range in Socorro, New Mexico
- 15th Space Surveillance Squadron, Detachment 2 (15 SPSS, Det. 2): Diego Garcia, British Indian Ocean Territory
- 15th Space Surveillance Squadron (15 SPSS; operated directly by the main squadron unit rather than a detached element): Maui Space Surveillance Complex in Maui, Hawaii

A fourth site at Choe Jong San, South Korea was closed in 1993 due to nearby smog, weather, and cost concerns. A fifth GEODSS unit was planned for a site in Portugal, but this was never built. Moron Optical Space Surveillance (MOSS), a transportable 22-inch-aperture (560 mm) telescope that contributed to the GEODSS system was operational at Morón Air Base in Spain from 1997 to 2012.

Each of the three sites has three optical telescopes. These telescopes can detect objects with a sensitivity 10,000 times that of the human eye. Because of this sensitivity, and the greater amount of light present during daytime that masks the reflected light of objects in space, the system can only operate at night. As with any ground-based optical system, GEODSS requires optimal atmospheric conditions (low humidity, clear weather, and minimal light pollution). The New Mexico site was upgraded in June 2025, and the Hawaii site was upgraded in April 2026. These upgrades have doubled the field of view and search speed, and more than tripled the detection sensitivity of the GEODSS system.

A vital part of USSPACECOM's Space Surveillance Network, GEODSS is employed mainly to track deep-space objects such as satellites and space debris, from roughly 3,000 miles out to beyond geosynchronous altitudes. The GEODSS system can detect objects as small as a basketball more than 20,000 miles (32,000 km) in space. Each GEODSS site tracks approximately 3,000 objects per night out of 9,900 objects that are regularly tracked and accounted for. Objects detected within 20 miles (32 km) of the orbit of the International Space Station (ISS) will cause the ISS to adjust its orbit to avoid collision. The oldest object tracked is Vanguard 1, launched in 1958.

== Space Based Visible (SBV) Sensor ==
The SSN included one spaceborne sensor, the Space-Based Visible (SBV) sensor, carried into orbit aboard the Midcourse Space Experiment (MSX) satellite launched by the Ballistic Missile Defense Organization in 1996. It was retired from service on June 2, 2008.

The Space Based Space Surveillance (SBSS) pathfinder satellite now performs the mission previously handled by the MSX SBV.

The Canadian military satellite Sapphire, launched in 2013, also contributes data to the SSN.

== Civil services ==
The USSPACECOM is primarily interested in the active satellites, but also tracks space debris. As the number of space debris and the value of satellites in space grew, it has become important to protect civil economic activity and help satellite operators avoid collisions with debris. In 2010, USSTRATCOM was given authority to provide space situational awareness services to commercial and foreign actors. As of 2019, the following services are provided: positional data of all tracked objects, conjunction assessment, disposal/end-of-life support, and more through the space-track.org website.

== See also ==
- Air Force Space Surveillance System
- Deep Space Advanced Radar Capability
- Space Situational Awareness Programme, the European Space Agency's near-Earth object and space debris tracking programme
- Kessler syndrome
- Project Space Track
- Satellite watching
- Space debris
- Russia :
  - Krona space object recognition station and Krona-N, Russian telescope- and radar-based space surveillance facilities
  - Okno and Okno-S, Russian telescope-based space surveillance facilities
  - Main Space Intelligence Centre, the headquarters of the Russian military's space surveillance network, SKKP
