= Eglin AFB Site C-6 =

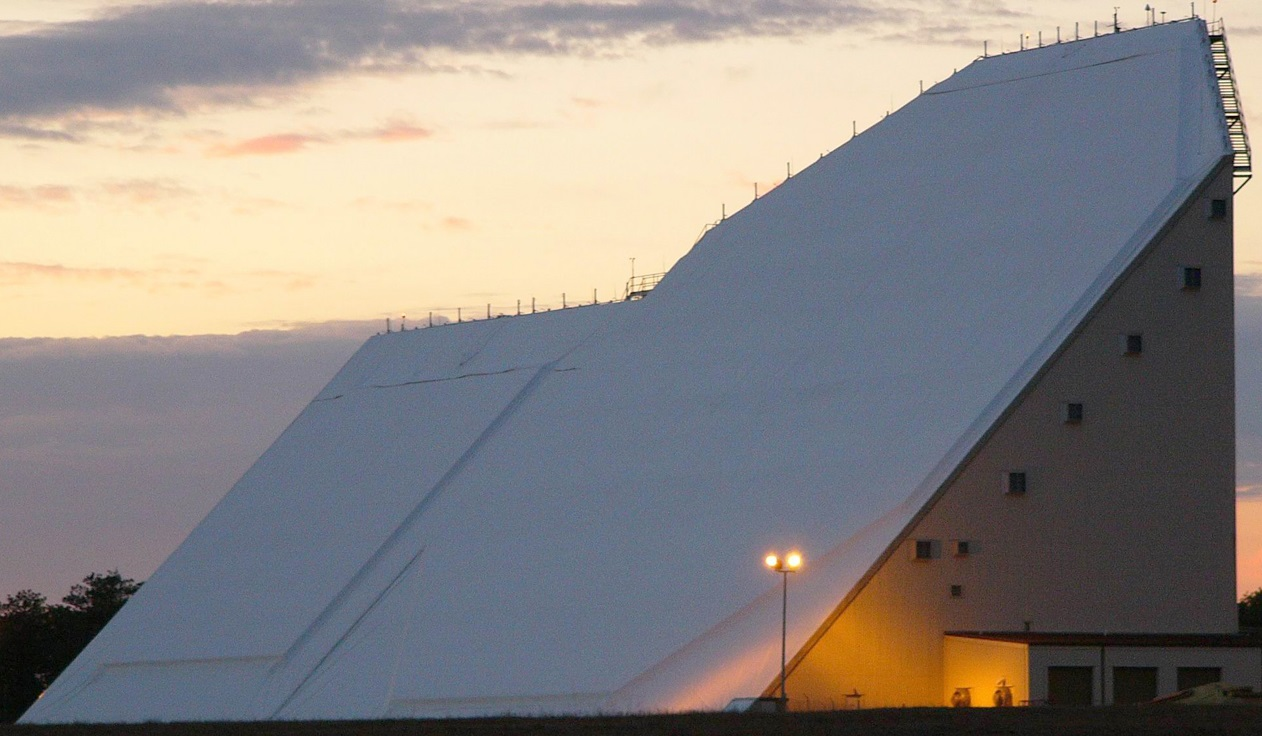
- The transmitting and receiving phased array antennas are mounted on the 45° angled side of the transmitter/receiver building at Eglin AFB Site C-6. The antennas face southward in a direction that intercepts the 90 minute circular orbit altitude near the equator.

General information
- Type: transmitter/receiver building
- Architectural style: phased array building
- Location: elevated landform between Fox Branch, Little Alaqua, and Little Basin Creeks, Walton County, United States
- Coordinates: 30°34′24″N 86°12′54″W
- Owner: United States Space Force

Technical details
- Material: structural steel: 1,250 tons concrete: 1,400 cubic yards (1,100 m^{3})

Design and construction
- Developer: Bendix Corporation

Website
- 21 Space Wing Fact Sheet 4730

Eglin AFB Site C-6 is a United States Space Force radar station which houses the AN/FPS-85 phased array radar, associated computer processing system(s), and radar control equipment designed and constructed for the U.S. Air Force by the Bendix Communications Division, Bendix Corporation. Commencing operations in 1969, the AN/FPS-85 was the first large phased array radar. The entire radar/computer system is located at a receiver/transmitter building and is supported by the site's power plant, fire station, 2 water wells (for 128 people), and other infrastructure for the system. As part of the US Space Force's Space Surveillance Network its mission is to detect and track spacecraft and other manmade objects in Earth orbit for the Combined Space Operations Center satellite catalogue. With a peak radiated power of 32 megawatts the Space Force claims it is the most powerful radar in the world, and can track a basketball-sized object up to 22,000 nautical miles (41,000 km) from Earth. In accordance with the Joint Electronics Type Designation System, the radar's "AN/FPS-85" designation represents the 85th design of an Army-Navy fixed radar(pulsed) electronic device for searching.

== Background and mission ==
The AN/FPS-85 radar constructed at Eglin Site C-6 in the 1960s during the Cold War as a cutting edge phased array radar and computer system originally designed to detect and track orbital nuclear missiles. During the 1960s, to counter the growing threat from the West's nuclear missiles on their borders in Turkey, Europe, and Asia, the Soviet Union (now Russia) developed a system to deliver nuclear weapons with missiles in Earth orbit, called a Fractional Orbital Bombardment System (FOBS). The United States had early-warning radar systems for missiles such as BMEWS, but it could only detect threats incoming from the north, because a nuclear strike against the US from the Soviet Union using conventional intercontinental ballistic missiles (ICBMs) would come by the shortest (great circle) route, over the North Pole. FOBS missiles in contrast could orbit the Earth before beginning their reentry, so they could attack the US from any direction. In a 15 March 1962 speech during the Cuban Missile Crisis, Soviet premier Nikita Khrushchev alluded to this developing capability:

"We can launch nuclear missiles not only over the North Pole, but in the opposite direction too. Global rockets can fly from the oceans or other directions where warning facilities cannot be installed. Given global missiles, the warning system has lost its importance. Global missiles cannot be spotted in time to prepare any measures against them."

The possibility of such a threat from space, as well as the increasing number of satellites in Earth orbit since Sputnik, convinced the U.S. Air Force that it needed to greatly expand its space tracking facilities, and the AN/FPS-85 was designed for this mission. Its south-facing radar antenna with 120° azimuth coverage was well situated for monitoring low-inclination (equatorial) orbits in addition to detecting FOBS attacks, and could reportedly see 80% of satellites orbiting the Earth.

Construction of the radar began in 1962, but a fire during predeployment testing destroyed it in 1965. It was rebuilt and became operational in 1969.

The AN/FPS-85 was the world's first large phased array radar. The Air Force developed phased array technology because conventional mechanically rotated radar antennas could not turn fast enough to track multiple ballistic missiles. A nuclear strike on the US would consist of hundreds of ICBMs incoming simultaneously. The beam of a phased array radar is steered electronically without moving the fixed antenna, so it can be pointed in a different direction in milliseconds, allowing it to track many incoming missiles at the same time. The AN/FPS-85 could track 200 objects simultaneously. This capability is now useful for tracking the thousands of manmade pieces of space debris currently in orbit. The phased array technology pioneered in the AN/FPS-85 was further developed in the AN/FPS-115 PAVE PAWS radars, and is now used in most military radars and many civilian applications.

In 1975 the deployment by the Soviet Union of submarine launched ballistic missiles (SLBMs), which were also not limited to a northern trajectory and were a greater threat because of the smaller warning time due to their shorter flight path, caused the Air Force to change the primary mission of the radar to SLBM detection and tracking. By 1987 the construction of two south-facing PAVE PAWS radar sites in Georgia and Texas took over this workload, and the AN/FPS-85 was returned to full-time spacewatch duties.

Today other radars share the spacetracking duties, but the AN/FPS-85 is still the primary surveillance radar in the US Space Surveillance Network due to its high power and good coverage, reportedly handling 30% of the SSN workload. The Space Force claims it is the only phased array radar that can track spacecraft in deep space, can detect an object the size of a basketball out to geosynchronous orbit, 35,700 km in space, and is the most powerful radar in the world. However its aging legacy technology, which uses vacuum tubes, gives it high maintenance costs. Its maintenance crew must repair an average of 17 of its 5000 modular transmitter units daily, at an annual cost of $2 million.

== How the radar works ==
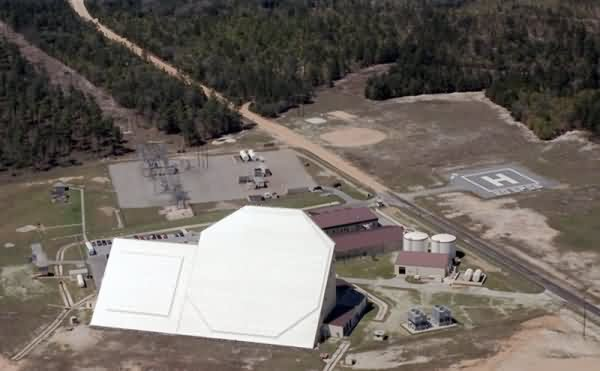
Aerial view of radar, showing transmitter building (white) with square transmitting array (left) and octagonal receiving array (right)

Animation showing how a PESA phased array works. It consists of an array of antenna elements (A) powered by a transmitter (TX). The feed current for each antenna passes through a phase shifter (φ) controlled by a computer (C). The moving red lines show the wavefronts of the radio waves emitted by each element. The AN/FPS-85 radar operates similarly, but has a separate transmitter for each antenna.

The AN/FPS-85 radar operates at a frequency of 442 MHz (a wavelength of 68 cm) in the UHF band, just below the UHF television broadcast band, with a 10 MHz bandwidth and a peak output power of 32 megawatts. The radar has separate transmitting and receiving array antennas mounted side-by-side on the sloping face of its transmitter building, pointing south at an elevation angle of 45° (most modern phased array radars use a single antenna array for both transmitting and receiving, but at the time it was built this was the simplest design). The Space Fence radar also uses separate transmit and receive antenna arrays. The transmitting antenna (on the left in the pictures) was a square 72x72 array of 5,184 crossed-dipole antenna elements spaced 0.55 wavelength (37 cm) apart, which was later upgraded to 5928 elements. Each antenna element receives power from a separate transmitter module having an output power of 10 kW. The receiving antenna on the right consists of an octagonal array 58 m in diameter consisting of 19,500 crossed dipole antenna elements feeding 4,660 receiver modules.

The transmitter module for each antenna element contains a phase shifter which can change the phase (relative timing) of the oscillating current applied to the antenna, under control of the central computer. Due to the phenomenon of interference, the radio waves from each separate transmitting antenna element combine (superimpose) in front of the antenna to produce a beam of radio waves (plane waves) traveling in a specific direction. By altering the relative phase of the radio waves emitted by the individual antennas, the computer can instantly steer the beam to a different direction.

The beam of radio waves reflects off the target object, and some of the waves return to the receiving array. Like the transmitting antennas, each receiving antenna element has a phase shifter attached, through which the current from the antenna must pass to get to the receiver. The currents from the separate antennas add together in the receiver with the correct phase that the receiver is sensitive to waves coming from only one direction. By altering the phase of the receiving antennas, the computer can steer the receiving pattern (main lobe) of the antenna to the same direction as the transmitted beam.

The radar beam can be deflected up to 60° from its central boresight axis, allowing it to scan an azimuth (horizontal angle) of 120° and an elevation range from the horizon to 15° past the zenith. The transmitted beam is 1.4° wide. The receive pattern is only 0.8° wide, but is split into 9 subbeams or sublobes at slightly different angles, surrounding the target. By determining which of the 9 sublobes receives the strongest return signal, the computer can determine which direction the target is moving, facilitating tracking.

The operation of the radar is completely automated, controlled by 3 computers, including two IBM ES-9000 mainframes. The radar operates 24 hours a day, in a rapid repeating cycle 50 milliseconds long (called a "resource period") during which it transmits up to 8 pulses and listens for an echo. In its surveillance mode it repeatedly scans a predetermined path called a "surveillance fence" along the horizon across a wide azimuth to detect orbiting objects as they rise above the horizon into the radar's field of view.

== Structures ==
Transmitter/receiver building
The antenna elements are mounted on the inclined faces of the transmitter/receiver building. and within the structure is the remainder of the radar, computer, and crew operations equipment. By 2012, the computer room had 2 "IBM ES-9000 mainframe computers, two RADAR and Interface Control Equipment cabinets, and two SunSparc workstations." In the squadron Mission Operations Center, "...personnel use a screen with [space] objects assigned numbers, similar to an air traffic control screen." An attached garage is on the building's east side.
Power building
The power building has an electrical generation system (cf. the earlier BMEWS "ELEC PWR PLANT" models AN/FPA-19 and -24.)
Fire Station
In 2011, the site's fire station (30°34′24″N 086°12′52″W) was added to the USGS's Geographical Names Information System (the transmitter/receiver building is not listed.)
Recreation facilities
A softball field and gymnasium are available.
Monitoring station
A nearby monitoring station is used for processing a once-per-second calibration pulse transmitted by the radar.
Helipad
A landing area for helicopters and tilt-rotor aircraft for logistical support and, if required, emergency evacuation.

== History ==
1950s missile testing over the Gulf of Mexico used radar sites on federal land assigned to Eglin AFB (e.g., the Anclote Missile Tracking Annex through 1969 at the mouth of the Anclote River near Tampa, the 1959 Cudjoe Key Missile Tracking Annex, and the Carrabelle Missile Tracking Annex that "transferred from RADC to Eglin AFB" on 1 October 1962.) "Following the launching of Sputnik I on 4 October 1957, the Air Force's Missile Test Center at Patrick AFB, Florida, set up·a project to observe and collect data on satellites."

Eglin AFB had its "first satellite tracking facility…operational fall 1957", and the 496L System Program Office formed in early 1959. Bendix Corporation was contracted and built a linear array at their Baltimore facility, followed by a prototype "wideband phased array radar (EPS 46-XW 1)" with IBM computer from Spring 1959 through November 1960. The Bendix AN/FPS-46 Electronically Steerable Array Radar (ESAR) using L-band began transmitting in November 1960 as "the first full-size pencil-beam phased-array radar system." "HQ AFSC decided to give full technical responsibility for the development of a sensor for the 496L Space Track System to RADC…after the Soviet lead in satellite technology in October 1957 and the subsequent failure to locate Explorer XII for six months after it was launched" on 16 August 1961. Gen. J. Toomay was program manager after the phased array program transferred to RADC and based on the Bendix Radio Division's ESAR success, the FPS-85 contract was signed on 2 April 1962.

=== Site construction ===
Site C-6 construction began in October 1962 for a system "providing for the possibilities of numerous tube failures by arranging for a large number of people to do replacements" during operations. On 5 November 1964, DDR&E recommended the Site C-6 system be used for submarine-launched ballistic missile detection. Before radar testing planned in May 1965, a 5 January 1965 fire due to arcing that ignited dielectric material "almost totally destroyed" the transmitter/receiver building and contents (the system was insured.) On 22 June 1965 the Joint Chiefs of Staff directed CONAD to prepare a standby plan to also use Site C-6 computer facilities "as a backup" to the NORAD/ADC Space Defense Center "prior to the availability of the AN/FPS-85."

By December 1965 NORAD decided to use the future Site C-6 radar "for SLBM surveillance on an "on-call" basis" "at the appropriate DEFCON", and the specifications for the Avco 474N SLBM Detection and Warning System contracted 9 December 1965 required the AN/GSQ-89 processing system for networking the AN/FSS-7 SLBM Detection Radar to also process Site C-6 data. By June 1966 the Site C-6 system was planned "to have the capability to operate in the SLBM [warning] mode simultaneously with the [space] surveillance and tracking modes". Rebuilding of the "separate faces for transmitting and receiving" began in 1967, with the destroyed analog phase shifters and vacuum tube receivers replaced by low-loss diode phase shifters and transistor receivers.

=== Space Defense ===
Eglin Site C-6's squadron of the 9th Aerospace Defense Division activated in September 1968 (now the 20th Space Control Squadron) and after "technical problems"; the site with radar and computer systems was completed in 1968, were turned over to Air Force Systems Command on 20 September 1968, and "became operational in December 1968,

Eglin Site C-6 was assigned to Aerospace Defense Command on 20 December 1968, and the site - using the FORTRAN computer language--became operational during the week of 9 February 1969. Site C-6 was the 1971-84 location of the Alternate Space Surveillance Center. In 1972 20% of the site's "surveillance capability…became dedicated to search for SLBMs" (the USAF SLBM Phased Array Radar System was initiated In November 1972 by the JCS while the Army's MSR and PAR phased arrays for missile defense were under construction.) The FPS-85 was expanded in 1974, and "a scanning program to detect" SLBM warheads was installed in 1975. Alaska's AN/FPS-108 Cobra Dane phased array site was completed in 1976 and from 1979 until 1983, Site C-6 was assigned to Strategic Air Command's Directorate of Space and Missile Warning Systems (SAC/SX)--as were the new PAVE PAWS phased array sites operational in 1980.

=== Space Command / Air Force Space Command ===
In 1983 Eglin Site C-6 transferred to Space Command (later renamed Air Force Space Command), and the "FPS-85 assumed a deep space role in November 1988 after receiving a range-extension upgrade enabling integration of many pulses." After a contractor protest was denied in 1993, a "new radar control computer" was installed at the site in 1994 (upgraded software was installed in 1999.) The original central monitoring system that tested for failing transmitter modules was replaced by a PC-based system in March 1994. In 1994 when the "amplifier and mixing functions on the existing transmitters" used six vacuum tubes for each module, Southwest Research Institute was redesigning the transmitters (5 tubes were replaced by solid-state components.) By 1998, the site was providing space surveillance on "38 percent of the near-earth catalogue" of space objects (ESC's "SND C2 SPO was the System Program Office.) "A complete modernization…of the 1960s signal-processing system was being studied in 1999", and in 2002 Site C-6 was tracking "over 95 percent of all earth satellites daily." In 2008, the site's squadron won the General Lance W. Lord Award for mission accomplishment (new "3-D modeling software" had been implemented.) In 2009, the site had been included in a computer model of the February 2009 satellite collision, and GCC Enterprises was contracted for completing "AntiTerrorism and Force Protection Improvements" to the site's infrastructure (perimeter fences, etc.), By 2011 the site's "16 million observations of satellites per year" (rate of 30.4/minute) was "30 percent of the space surveillance network's total workload". A 2012 Sensitive Compartmented Information Facility opened at the site and in 2013, "new operating modes at Cavalier AFS and Eglin AFB [Site C-6 provided] more accuracy" than the 1961 VHF Space Surveillance Fence, which could not detect space objects in low altitude/high eccentricity orbits and was decommissioned by November 2013.

In September 2019, L3Harris Technologies was awarded a $12.8 million in a contract for sustainment support of the radar in the Air Force Space Command Space Surveillance Network.

=== United States Space Force ===
In December 2019, with the establishment of the U.S. Space Force (USSF) as an independent U.S. military service under the Department of the Air Force, Eglin Site C-6 and its assigned squadron, the 20th Space Surveillance Squadron (20 SPSS), became a USSF facility.

== See also ==
- List of radars
- List of military electronics of the United States
- Deep Space Advanced Radar Capability
