= Midcourse Space Experiment =

Space telescope

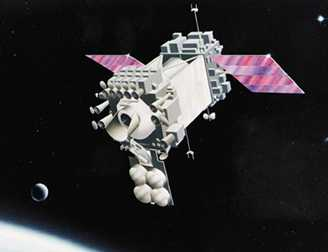
- Names: MSX
- Mission type: Technology demonstration
- Operator: BMDO
- COSPAR ID: 1996-024A
- SATCAT no.: 23851
- Website: MSX home page
- Mission duration: 12 years, 2 months, 16 days

Spacecraft properties
- Launch mass: 2,700 kg (6,000 lb)

Start of mission
- Launch date: 24 April 1996, 12:27 UTC
- Rocket: Delta 7920-10; D-235
- Launch site: Vandenberg AFB SLC-2W

End of mission
- Disposal: Decommissioned
- Last contact: 10 July 2008

Orbital parameters
- Reference system: Geocentric
- Perigee altitude: 898 km (558 mi)
- Apogee altitude: 903 km (561 mi)
- Period: 100 minutes

The Midcourse Space Experiment (MSX) is a Ballistic Missile Defense Organization (BMDO) satellite experiment (unmanned space mission) to map bright infrared sources in space. MSX offered the first system demonstration of technology in space to identify and track ballistic missiles during their midcourse flight phase.

== History ==
On 24 April 1996, the US Air Force launched the MSX satellite on a Delta II launch vehicle from Vandenberg AFB, California. MSX was placed in a Sun-synchronous orbit at 898 km and an inclination of 99.16 degrees. MSX's mission was to gather data in three spectral bands (long wavelength infrared, visible, and ultraviolet).

From 13 May 1998, MSX became a contributing sensor to the Space Surveillance Network.

== Launch debris incident ==
Lottie Williams was exercising in a park in Tulsa, Oklahoma on January 22, 1997, when she was hit in the shoulder by a 15-centimetre (6 in) piece of blackened metallic material. U.S. Space Command confirmed that a used Delta II rocket from the April 1996 launch of the Midcourse Space Experiment had re-entered into the atmosphere 30 minutes earlier. The object tapped her on the shoulder and fell off harmlessly onto the ground. Williams collected the item and NASA tests later showed that the fragment was consistent with the materials of the rocket, and Nicholas Johnson, the agency's chief scientist for orbital debris, believes that she was indeed hit by a piece of the rocket.

== Operations ==
Operational from 1996 to 1997, MSX mapped the galactic plane and areas either missed or identified as particularly bright by the Infrared Astronomical Satellite (IRAS) at wavelengths of 4.29 μm, 4.35 μm, 8.28 μm, 12.13 μm, 14.65 μm, and 21.3 μm.

It carried the 33-cm SPIRIT III infrared telescope and interferometer–spectrometer with solid hydrogen-cooled five line-scanned infrared focal plane arrays.

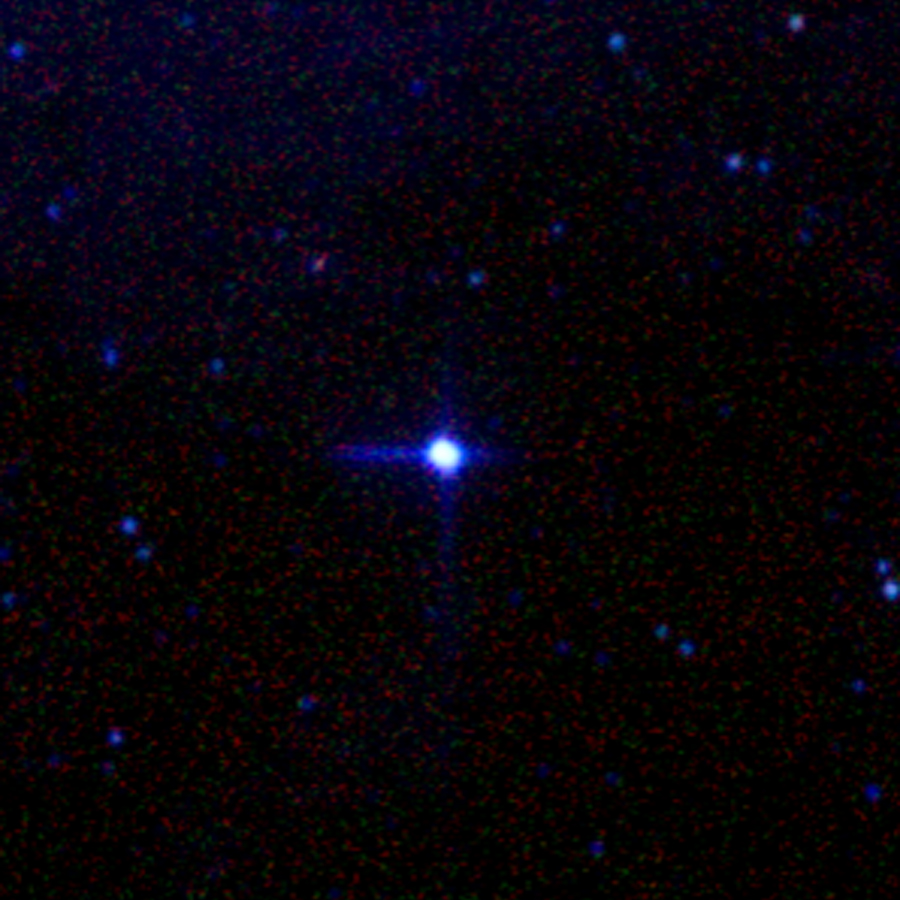
Alpha Centauri by MSX

Calibration of MSX posed a challenge for designers of the experiment, as baselines did not exist for the bands it would be observing under. Engineers solved the problem by having MSX fire projectiles of known composition in front of the detector, and calibrating the instruments to the known black-body curves of the objects. The MSX calibration serves as the basis for other satellites working in the same wavelength range, including AKARI (2006-2011) and the Spitzer Space Telescope (SST).

MSX data is currently available in the Infrared Science Archive (IRSA) provided by NASA's Infrared Processing and Analysis Center (IPAC). Collaborative efforts between the Air Force Research Laboratory and IPAC has resulted in an archive containing images for about 15 percent of the sky, including the entire Galactic Plane, the Large Magellanic Cloud, and regions of the sky missed by IRAS.

== See also ==
- List of largest infrared telescopes
- Militarisation of space
