= BSTAR =

BSTAR is a way of modeling aerodynamic drag on a satellite in the simplified general perturbation model 4 satellite orbit propagation model.

Traditionally, aerodynamic resistance ("drag") is given by

$$F_\text{D} = \frac{1}{2} \rho C_\text{d} A v^2$$

where $\rho$ is the air density, $C_\text{d}$ is the drag coefficient, $A$ is the frontal area, and $v$ is the velocity.

The acceleration due to drag is then

$$a_\text{D} = \frac{F_\text{D}}{m} = \frac{\rho C_\text{d} A v^2}{2m}$$

In aerodynamic theory, the factor

$$B = \frac{C_\text{d} A}{m}$$

is the inverse of the ballistic coefficient, and its unit is area per mass. Further incorporating a reference air density and the factor of two in the denominator, we get the starred ballistic coefficient:

$$B^* = \frac{\rho_0 B}{2} = \frac{\rho_0 C_\text{d} A}{2m}$$

thus reducing the expression for the acceleration due to drag to

$$a_\text{D} = \frac{\rho}{\rho_0} B^* v^2$$

As it can be seen, $B^*$ has a unit of inverse length. For orbit propagation purposes, there is a field for BSTAR drag in two-line element set (TLE) files, where it is to be given in units of inverse Earth radii. The corresponding reference air density is given as $0.15696615\text{ kg}/(\mathrm{m}^2 \cdot R_\text{Earth})$. One must be very careful when using the value of $B^*$ released in the TLEs, as it is fitted to work on the SGP4 orbit propagation framework and, as a consequence, may even be negative as an effect of unmodelled forces on the orbital determination process.
