= 20th Space Surveillance Squadron =

U.S. Space Force unit

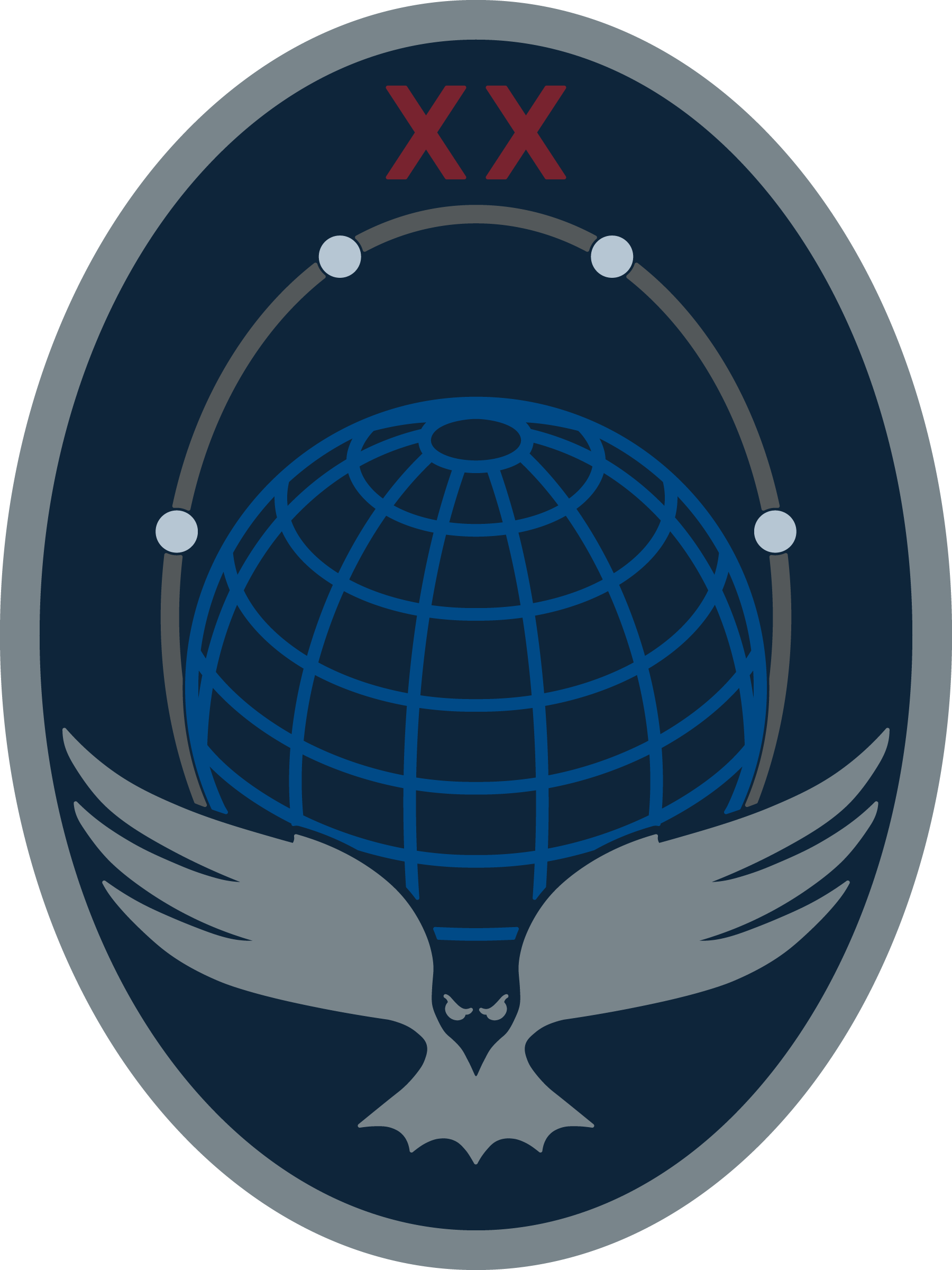
- Squadron emblem
- Active: 1966 – present
- Country: United States
- Branch: United States Space Force
- Type: Space operations
- Role: Space surveillance
- Size: 250 personnel
- Part of: Space Delta 2
- Home base: Eglin AFB, Florida
- Motto: "Detect – Track – Identify"
- Mascot: Eagles
- Systems: AN/FPS-85 radar; Electro-optical deep space surveillance sensors; Space Fence
- Decorations: Air Force Outstanding Unit Award

Commanders
- Current commander: Lt Col Derek Haun

Insignia
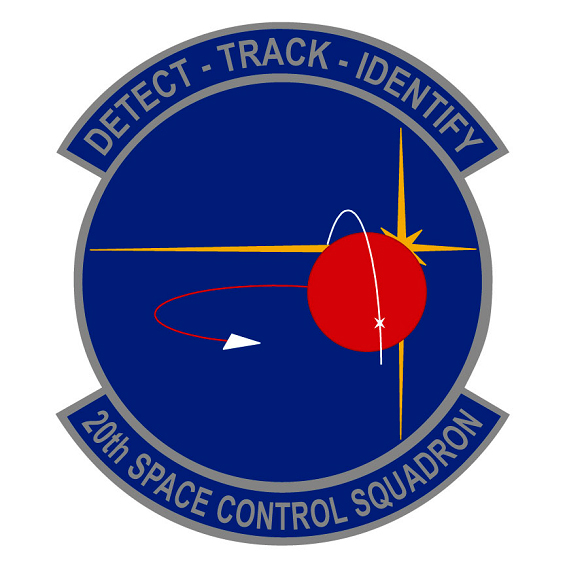
- Former 20th Space Control Squadron emblem

The 20th Space Surveillance Squadron (20 SPSS) is a Space Delta 2 unit located at Eglin Air Force Base, Florida with the mission to execute multiplatform, tactical space warfighting domain characterization, recognition, and responsiveness to achieve 21st Space Wing and United States Space Command intent. The unit, formerly designated the 20th Space Control Squadron (20 SPCS), was renamed on 25 March 2022.

== History ==
Eglin AFB Site C-6's squadron of the 9th Aerospace Defense Division activated in September 1968. and was turned over to Air Force Systems Command on 20 September 1968, and became operational in December 1968.

Eglin Site C-6 was assigned to Aerospace Defense Command on 20 December 1968. In 1972 20% of the site's "surveillance capability...became dedicated to search for SLBMs" and was subsequently renamed the 20th Missile Warning Squadron (the USAF SLBM Phased Array Radar System was initiated in November 1972 by the JCS while the Army's MSR and PAR phased arrays for missile defense were under construction.) The AN/FPS-85 facility was expanded in 1974, and "a scanning program to detect" SLBM warheads was installed in 1975. Alaska's AN/FPS-108 Cobra Dane phased array site was completed in 1976 and from 1979 until 1983, Site C-6 was assigned to Strategic Air Command's Directorate of Space and Missile Warning Systems (SAC/SX)--as were the new PAVE PAWS phased array sites operational in 1980.

On 25 March 2022, the squadron was renamed the 20th Space Surveillance Squadron (20 SPSS) in a ceremony officiated by the Space Delta 2 Commander, Colonel Mark Brock.

=== Space Command ===
In 1983 Eglin Site C-6 transferred to Space Command (later renamed Air Force Space Command), and the "FPS-85 assumed a deep space role in November 1988 after receiving a range-extension upgrade enabling integration of many pulses." With the addition of additional missile warning sites becoming active, the squadron eliminated its missile warning mission, and the surveillance squadron name was restored in 1987. The unit was renamed the 20th Space surveillance squadron when a "new radar control computer" was installed at the site in 1994. By 1998, the site was providing space surveillance on "38 percent of the near-earth catalogue" of space objects (ESC's "SND C2 SPO was the System Program Office.) "A complete modernization...of the 1960s signal-processing system was being studied in 1999", and in 2002 Site C-6 was tracking "over 95 percent of all earth satellites daily." The squadron was renamed the 20th Space Control Squadron in February 2003. In 2004, significant components of Naval Space Command were transferred to the 20th Space Control Squadron, including components of the former Naval Space Surveillance System (renamed the Air Force Space Surveillance System). By 2011 the site's "16 million observations of satellites per year" (rate of 30.4/minute) was "30 percent of the space surveillance network's total workload".

=== United States Space Force ===
In September 2020, the 20 SPCS joined the newly created United States Space Force.

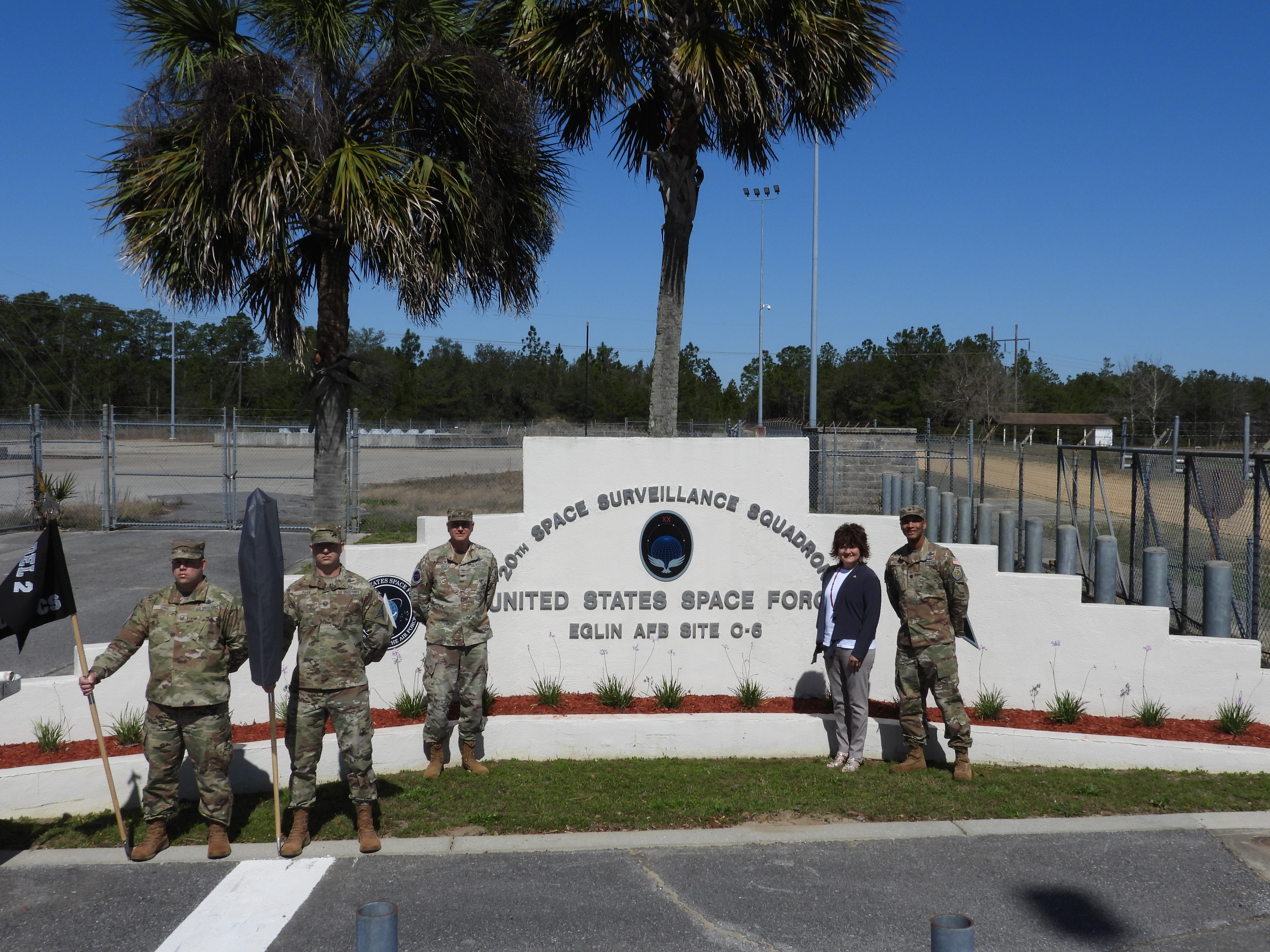
Col Mark Brock and Lt Col Alfred T. Maynard officiate the renaming of the unit to the 20th Space Surveillance Squadron.

=== GEODSS ===
In 2016, the 20th Space Control Squadron acquired the three Ground-based Electro-Optical Deep Space Surveillance (GEODSS) sites. These sites and their respective detachments were transferred from the 20th Space Control Squadron to the 15th Space Surveillance Squadron in May 2022.

== List of commanders ==
- Lt Col James J. Hogan
- Lt Col Shane M. Connary
- Lt Col G. McCann
- Lt Col Thomas G. Falzarano, July 2008 – June 2010
- Lt Col George Tromba, June 2010 – June 2012
- Lt Col Mitch Katosic, June 2012 – June 2014
- Lt Col Mafwa Kuvibidila, June 2014 – June 2016
- Lt Col Raj Agrawal, June 2016 – 26 June 2018
- Lt Col David Tipton, 26 June 2018 – 16 July 2020
- Lt Col Alfred Maynard, 16 July 2020 – June 2022
- Lt Col David Tipton, 26 June 2018 – 16 July 2020
- Lt Col Richard Fancher, June 2022 – July 2024
- Lt Col Derek Haun, July 2024 – present

== Decorations ==
- Air Force Outstanding Unit Award
  - 1 January 2000 – 31 August 2001
  - 1 January 1999 – 31 December 1999
  - 1 January 1998 – 31 December 1998
  - 1 October 1997 – 30 September 1999
  - 1 October 1995 – 30 September 1997
  - 1 September 1991 – 31 August 1993
  - 1 September 1990 – 31 August 1991
  - 1 September 1988 – 31 August 1990

== See also ==
- No. 1 Remote Sensor Unit RAAF
