= Pirinçlik Air Base =

Closed American military base in Turkey

Coordinates: 37°54.1452′N 39°59.7822′E

Former location of Pirinçlik Air Base

Pirinçlik Air Base (Turkish: Pirinçlik Hava Üssü), also known as Pirinçlik Air Station, formerly Diyarbakır Air Station, was a 41-year-old American-Turkish military base near Diyarbakir, Turkey. Notable base commanders include Col. Dale Lee Norman. It was known as NATO's frontier post for monitoring the former Soviet Union and the Middle East, completely closed on 30 September 1997.

This return was the result of the general drawdown of US bases in Europe and improvement in space surveillance technology. The base near the southeastern city of Diyarbakir housed sensitive electronic intelligence-gathering systems for listening on the Middle East, Caucasus and Russia.

The Pirinçlik sensor system consisted of two radio frequency (RF) mechanical radar systems providing radar intelligence, space surveillance, and missile warning data to multiple users. Observations from Diyarbakır were normally the first radar reports of new Russian satellite launches from Kapustin Yar in the early days of satellite tracking; see Project Space Track. The site operated both a detection radar (AN/FPS-17) and a mechanical tracking radar (AN/FPS-79). Although limited by their mechanical technology, Pirinçlik's two radars gave the advantage of tracking two objects simultaneously in real time. Its location close to the southern Soviet Union made it the only ground sensor capable of tracking actual deorbits of Soviet space hardware. In addition, the Pirinçlik radar was the only 24-hour-per-day eastern hemisphere deep-space sensor.

== AN/FPS-17 and AN/FPS-79 radar systems ==
The AN/FPS-17 Space Surveillance Radar developed by the Rome Air Development Center (RADC) was the first surveillance radar system designed to detect objects in space. The FPS-17 detection scanning radars have fixed antennae oriented toward the Soviet Union. The Air Force FPS-79 UHF tracking radar at Diyarbakir-Pirinçlik in Turkey is capable of tracking missiles during flight. The 10-meter diameter dish antenna system has a variable focus feed horn system which can provide a wide beam for target detection, and a narrow beam for tracking (other similar radars have scan rates in excess of ${10^o}$ per second). Operating at 432 MHz, this radar has a maximum detection range in excess of 4,300 kilometers.

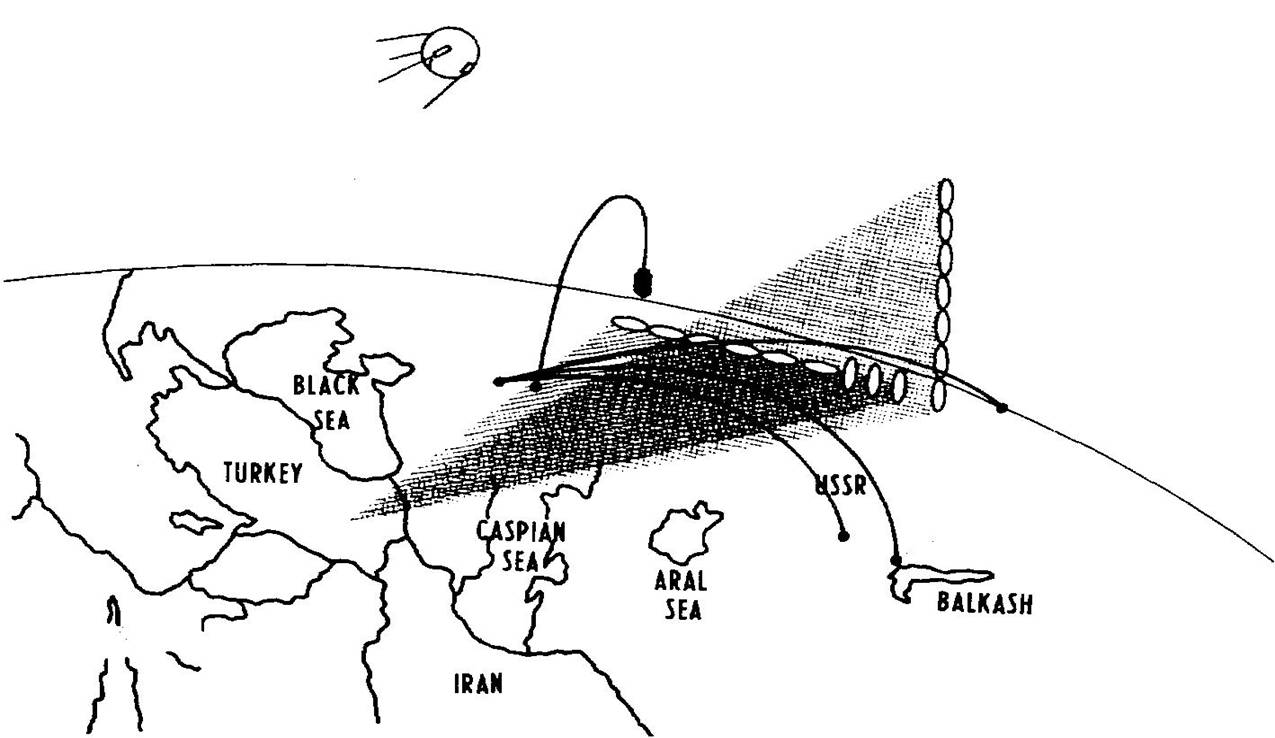
AN/FPS-17 fixed antennae radar at the Pirinçlik Air Station oriented toward Kapustin Yar, the Soviet Union to monitor missile test launches

Lincoln Laboratory’s phase-coded pulse-modulation receiver/exciter for the VHF AN/FPS-17 radar, built at the Pirinçlik site in eastern Turkey by the General Electric Company, allowed U.S. observers to monitor missile test launches from Kapustin Yar, deep within the Soviet Union. Subsequent installation of another AN/FPS-17 radar on Shemya, a western island in the chain of Aleutian Islands off Alaska, made it possible for U.S. observers to monitor Soviet missile test flights to the Kamchatka peninsula. The AN/FPS-17 radar was the first demonstration of pulse compression in an operational radar system.

In 1970, the name Diyarbakir Air Station was changed to that of Pirinçlik, the name of the small village 30 km west of Diyarbakir where the unit was actually located. On 1 June 1972, the 7022d Air Base Squadron was activated, under the command of the 39th Tactical Group. On 30 July 1981, the squadron was assigned to The U.S. Logistics Group. Its mission was to support 19th Surveillance Squadron, SAC, at Pirinçlik. It received logistical support from İncirlik Air Base.

Pirinçlik Air Station was a remote site, where personnel lived in quonset hut dorms, had one club for socialization, could not leave the base at night, and had few shopping or entertainment opportunities other than an occasional temporary duty to İncirlik. This site was so small that the perimeter fence was practically visible from anywhere on base. The staff consisted of 150 airmen which during the 1980s and after included about 20 or so females, 30+ officers, 120 American civilian contractors, and nearly 300 Turkish military and civilians.

On September 30, 1996, Lockheed Martin Corporation, Syracuse, N.Y., was awarded a $16,221,360 face value increase to a fixed-price incentive contract to provide for FY 1997 operation, maintenance, and logistic support of the sensor facilities at Pirinclik Air Station. The work was performed at Pirinçlik Air Station. The contract was completed in September 1997. The 21st Space Wing, Peterson AFB, Colorado, was the contracting activity.

== Base closure in 1997 ==
The Secretary of Defense announced February 13, 1997, that the U.S. Department of Defense would end or reduce operations at seven European installations as a result of the latest round of base and force realignment actions. The phrase "return" means the entire installation is vacated by U.S. forces and returned to the control of the host nation. This round included six installations in Germany and one in Turkey—Pirinçlik Air Base. This action began immediately, with the return of the installation to the host nation planned for September 1997. It affected about 117 U.S. Air Force personnel then assigned to the base.
