= Deep Space Advanced Radar Capability =

US Space Force project

Deep Space Advanced Radar Capability, or DARC, is a US Space Force project in partnership with Australia and the United Kingdom using Northrop Grumman as the main contractor. DARC purpose is to improve the detection and visibility of satellites, objects, space debris, and track activity in geosynchronous orbit. The ground-based system is expected to be fully operational by 2027 using three radars and ultimately deploying 27 parabolic antennas working in tandem to create a large detection array with increased capabilities over present deep space detection systems.

== See also ==
- Eglin AFB Site C-6
- United States Space Surveillance Network
