= Venice missile launch complex =

Cold War Regulus missile firing installation

Coordinates: 27.0649°N 82.4412°W

The Venice missile launch complex was a Cold War Regulus missile firing installation "adjacent to the Venice Municipal Airport" on the Venice, Florida, beach. Beginning in 1959, KD2U-1 drone versions of the U.S. Navy's Regulus were JATO-launched from the strip of beach in front of the airport, flew across the Gulf of Mexico for simulating a penetrating enemy bomber for test interception, and then were "recovered on the runway at Eglin" AFB. The launch complex was one of several Eglin missile range facilities (e.g., the Anclote Missile Tracking Annex near Tampa) and conducted the "Regulus 2, KD2U intercept missile test [on] September 3, 1959" in which the "first launch of the Air Force's new Bomarc IM-99A missile [successfully intercepted] the Regulus 2 missile at 35,000 feet altitude and at supersonic speed" (the Bomarc launch complex was at tbd after "BOMARC missiles arrived Jul 1958" at Hurlburt Field.)
