= 19th Space Operations Squadron =

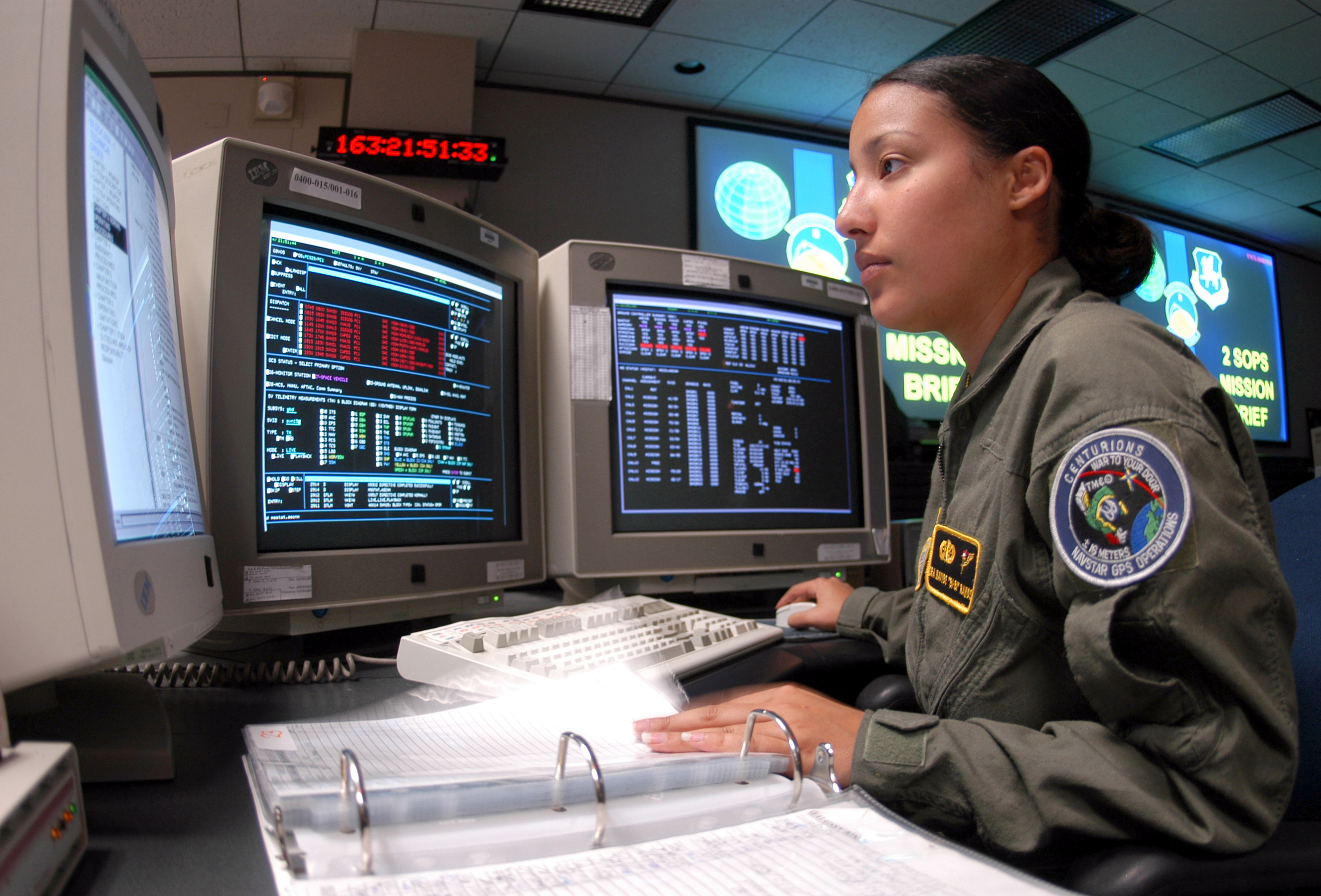
- A space systems operator during Global Positioning System operations
- Active: 1967-1997; 2000 – present
- Country: United States
- Branch: United States Air Force
- Role: Space Operations
- Part of: Air Force Reserve Command
- Garrison/HQ: Schriever AFB, Colorado
- Motto: In Place-On Time-On Target
- Decorations: Air Force Outstanding Unit Award

Insignia
- 19th Space Operations Squadron (approved 15 December 1967)

The 19th Space Operations Squadron is an Air Force Reserve space operations unit, located at Schriever Air Force Base, Colorado.

== Mission ==
The 19th Space Operations Squadron is a reserve associate unit with the 2nd Navigation Warfare Squadron (formerly 2d Space Operations Squadron) of the 50th Space Wing. It performs launch, early-orbit, anomaly resolution and disposal operations for the Global Positioning System. The squadron provides navigation, timing and nuclear detonation information to users worldwide. It supports daily operations while also maintaining a reserve force available for mobilization.

== History ==
=== Space detection operations in Turkey ===
Background

In October 1954, the US and Turkey began construction of Dyarbakir Air Station, Turkey. Construction began on a developmental radar designated the AN/FPS-17, a state-of-the art radar (for the time) with a 175-foot-high antenna. The radar detected the first Soviet launch missile in June 1955 and the world's first man-made satellite, Sputnik-1, in its initial orbit on 4 October 1957. In 1964 the Air Force added the first AN/FPS-79 tracking radar, with an 84-foot parabolic antenna, to provide accurate metric data on both missiles and satellites. If a new space object was sensed by the detection radar's fans, then the tracking radar could be oriented to achieve lock-on and tracking of the object. The radars were operated by the 6935th Radio Squadron, Mobile of USAF Security Service until 1964, when responsibility for the radars was transferred to Air Defense Command (ADC).

Squadron activation

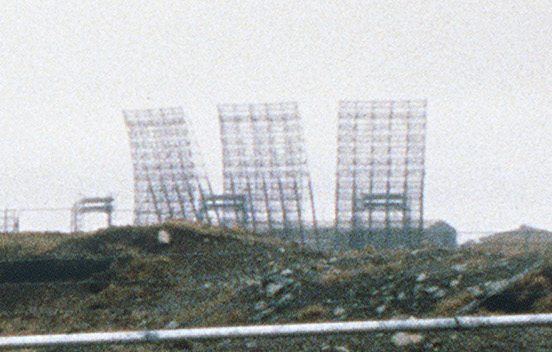
AN/FPS-17 as operated by the squadron

ADC organized the 19th Surveillance Squadron on 1 January 1967 to operate the Dyarbakir radars. The unit operated detection and tracking radar units to provide data on missile launches, deep space surveillance and tactical warning. The Diyabakir site closed on 27 July 1975 and was placed in caretaker status. During this time, the squadron did not conduct operations, but maintained the radar site in readiness for future operations. In October 1978, the radars were returned to operational status. By this time, ADC (Note: Air Defense Command had been redesignated Aerospace Defense Command in 1968 to recognize its space mission. The usual abbreviation for the command became AEDC.) had been disestablished and the squadron was an element of Strategic Air Command, which had assumed ADC's space mission. The mission and squadron were again transferred when the Air Force established Air Force Space Command in 1987.

During Operation Desert Storm the radar alerted American troops to incoming SCUD missiles. In 1992, the unit was redesignated the 19th Space Surveillance Squadron. The radars at what was now called Pirinclik Air Station functioned as a satellite monitor and launch and missile detection radar until the AN/FPS-17 radars were decommissioned in December 1995. The AN/FPS-79 tracking radar operated until the site closed in 1997.

=== Reserve associate operation ===
The squadron was redesignated the 19th Space Operations Squadron and activated in October 2000 at Schriever Air Force Base, Colorado in the reserve as an associate unit of the regular 2d Space Operations Squadron, operating the same equipment to manage the Global Positioning System alongside members of the 2d Squadron.

== Lineage ==
- Constituted as the 19th Surveillance Squadron and activated on 1 November 1966 (not organized) (Note: Cornett and Johnson indicate the unit was originally designated the 19th Aerospace Surveillance Squadron with the "Aerospace" being dropped on 3 January 1967. Cornett & Johnson, p. 149.)

Organized on 1 January 1967
Redesignated 19th Space Surveillance Squadron on 15 May 1992
Inactivated on 16 June 1997

- Redesignated 19th Space Operations Squadron on 1 May 2000

Activated in the reserve on 1 October 2000

=== Assignments ===
- Air Defense Command, 1 November 1966 (not organized)
- 73d Aerospace Surveillance Wing, 1 January 1967
- Fourteenth Aerospace Force, 30 April 1971
- 21st Air Division, 1 October 1976
- 7th Air Division, 1 December 1979
- 1st Space Wing, 1 May 1983
- 73d Space Surveillance Group (later 73 Space Group), 1 October 1991
- 21st Operations Group, 26 April 1995 – 16 June 1997
- 310th Space Group, 1 October 2000
- 310th Operations Group, 7 March 2008 – present

=== Stations ===
- Dyarbakir Air Station (later Pirinclik Air Station), Turkey, 1 January 1967 – 16 June 1997
- Schriever Air Force Base, Colorado, 1 October 2000 – present

=== Awards ===
Award streamer	Award	Dates	Notes
	Air Force Outstanding Unit Award	15 June 1972 – 14 June 1973	19th Surveillance Squadron
	Air Force Outstanding Unit Award	1 May 1983 – 30 April 1984	19th Surveillance Squadron
	Air Force Outstanding Unit Award	1 September 1989 – 31 August 1991	19th Surveillance Squadron
	Air Force Outstanding Unit Award	1 October 1995 – 30 September 1997	19th Space Surveillance Squadron
	Air Force Outstanding Unit Award	1 October 2000 - 30 September 2002	19th Space Operations Squadron
	Air Force Outstanding Unit Award	1 October 2001 - 1 October 2002	19th Space Operations Squadron
	Air Force Outstanding Unit Award	1 October 2002 – 30 July 2004	19th Space Operations Squadron
	Air Force Outstanding Unit Award	1 August 2004 – 31 July 2006	19th Space Operations Squadron
	Air Force Outstanding Unit Award	1 August 2006 - 31 July 2008	19th Space Operations Squadron
