= Ground-Based Radar Prototype =

X-band mechanically slewed phased array radar system

The Ground-Based Radar Prototype (GBR-P) is an X-band mechanically slewed phased array radar system. It functions primarily as a fire control radar for ballistic missile defence. The radar is used for surveillance (autonomously or by cue from other sensors), and is designed to acquire, track, discriminate targets and provide kill assessment. The system is currently located at the Ronald Reagan Ballistic Missile Defense Test Site, Kwajalein Atoll, Marshall Islands.

== See also ==
- Sea-Based X-Band Radar
- Upgraded Early Warning Radars
