= AN/FPS-17 =

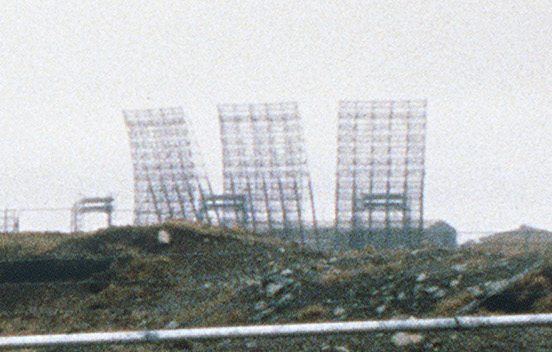
AN/FPS-17 antennas at Shemya, Alaska.

The AN/FPS-17 was a ground-based fixed-beam radar system that was installed at three locations worldwide, including Pirinçlik Air Base (formerly Diyarbakir Air Station) in south-eastern Turkey, Laredo, Texas and Shemya Island, Alaska.

This system was deployed to satisfy scientific and technical intelligence collection requirements during the Cold War. The first installation (designated AN/FPS-17, XW-1) at Diyarbakir was originally intended to provide surveillance of the USSR's missile test range at Kapustin Yar south of Stalingrad - especially to detect missile launchings. The data it produced, however, exceeded surveillance requirements, permitting the derivation of missile trajectories, the identification of earth satellite launches, the calculation of a satellite's ephemeris (position and orbit), and the synthesis of booster rocket performance. The success achieved by this fixed-beam radar led to the co-location of a tracking radar (AN/FPS-79), beginning in mid-1964. Together, these radars had the capability for estimating the configuration and dimensions of satellites or missiles and observing the reentry of crewed or uncrewed vehicles.

A second FPS-17 installation was made at Laredo, Texas, which was used primarily as a research and development site. The final operational installation was made at Shemya Island, Alaska, for missile detection.

In accordance with the Joint Electronics Type Designation System (JETDS), the "AN/FPS-17" designation represents the 17th design of an Army-Navy electronic device for fixed ground search radar. The JETDS system also now is used to name all Department of Defense electronic systems.

== Genesis ==
Experimentation with the detection of missiles by a modified SCR-270 radar in 1948 and 1949 at Holloman Air Force Base, New Mexico along with U.S. experience in the use of high-power components on other radars, created a basis for believing that a megawatt-rated radar could be fabricated for operation over much longer ranges than ever before. The need for intelligence on Soviet missile activity being acute, a formal requirement for such a radar was established, and Rome Air Development Center was given responsibility for engineering the system.

In October 1954 General Electric, which had experience in producing high-power VHF equipment and radars, was awarded a contract for the fabrication, installation, and testing of what was to be at the time the world's largest and most powerful operational radar. The contract stipulated that the equipment was to be in operation at Site IX near Diyarbakir within nine months: by 1 June 1955. Construction began in February, and the scheduled operational date was missed by fifteen minutes.

The original antenna installation was a large D.S. Kennedy parabolic reflector, 175 feet (53 m) high by 110 feet (34 m) wide, radiating in the frequency range 175 to 215 megahertz. Standard GE high-power television transmitters, modified for pulse operation, were used initially.

Surveillance was carried out by six horizontal beams over the Kapustin Yar area. In 1958 a second antenna, 150 feet (46 m) high by 300 feet (90 m) long (called the Cinerama antenna), and new 1.2-megawatt transmitters were installed as part of a modification kit which provided three additional horizontal beams, a seven-beam vertical fan, and greater range capability.

The elaborate system included automatic alarm circuitry, range-finding circuitry, and data-processing equipment; it was equipped to make 35 mm photographic recordings of all signals received. A preliminary reduction of data was accomplished on-site, but the final processing was done in the Foreign Technology Division at Wright Patterson Air Force Base.

From 15 June 1955, when the first Soviet missile was detected, to 1 March 1964, 508 incidents (sightings) were reported, 147 of them during the last two years of the period.

== Operation ==
The post-1958 Pirinçlik system had eight separate radar sets or channels, each with its own exciter, transmitter, duplexer, receiver, and data display unit. These eight channels fed electromagnetic energy into sixteen fixed beams formed by the two antennas, each channel, or transmitter-receiver combination, being time-shared between two beams. Pneumatically driven switches operated on a three-second cycle to power each beam alternately for 1.5 seconds. There were antenna feeds for two additional beams which could be made to function with some patchwork in the wiring.

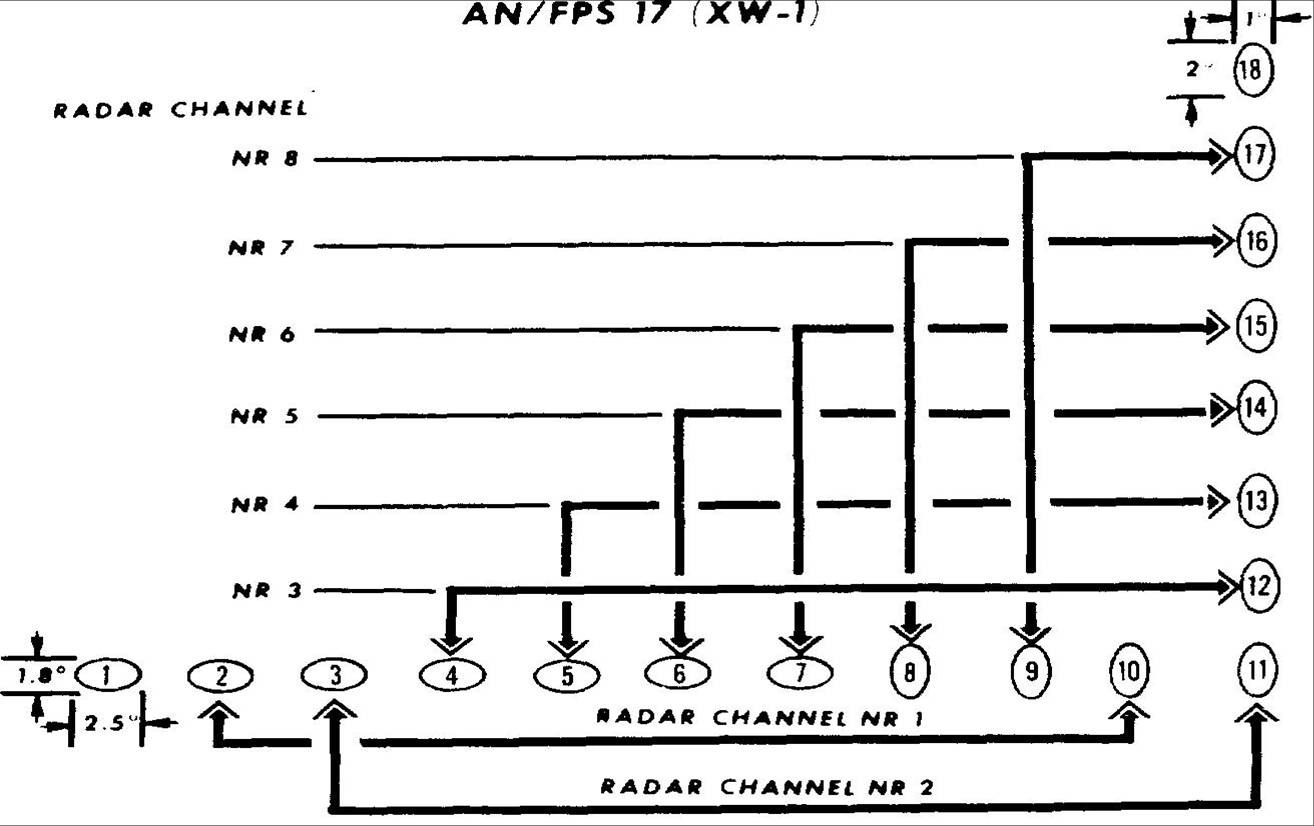
Beam pattern.

The antenna feeds were positioned to produce in space the beam pattern depicted in the figure. Beams 1 and 18 were those not ordinarily energized. Beams 1 through 7 used the older of the two antennas; 8 through 18 were formed by the newer, "cinerama" antenna, whose 300-foot (90 m) width gave them their narrow horizontal dimension.

Beams 2 through 9 were projected in horizontal array; 10 through 17 (although 10 actually lies in the horizontal row) were grouped as the vertical component. All beams of each group were powered simultaneously. Except for being controlled by a master timing signal, each of the eight channels operated independently of the others. Each transmitter was on a slightly different frequency to prevent interaction with the others. The transmitted pulse, 2000 microseconds long, was coded, or tagged, by being passed through a tapped delay line which may reversed the phase at 20-microsecond intervals. Upon reception the returned signal was passed through the same tapped delay line and compressed 100:1, to 20 microseconds in order to increase the accuracy and resolution of the range measurement, which was of course a function of the interval between transmission and return.

A delay line was an artificial transmission detour that served to retard the signal, made up with series inductances and parallel capacitances that yielded a constant delay. Pick-off points at 20-microsecond intervals permitted these sub-pulses to be extracted in such sequence that they all arrive together, to achieve the compression effect.

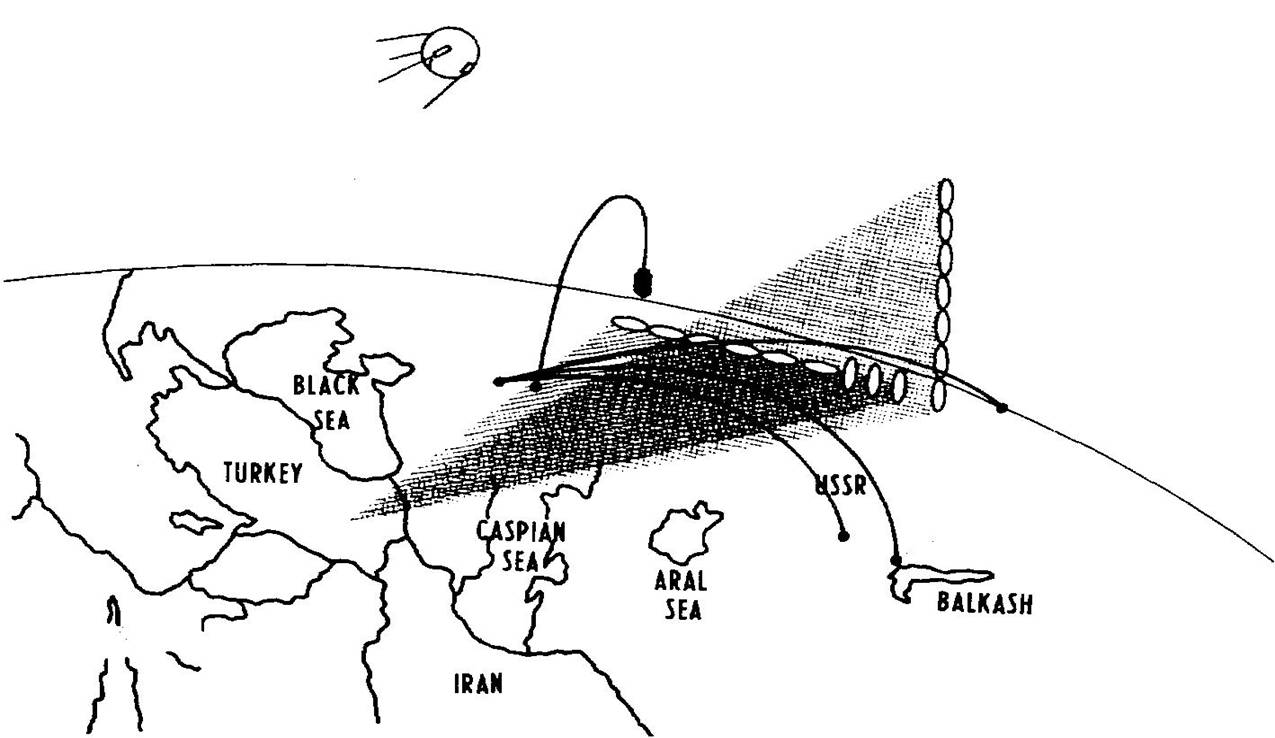
This diagram shows the beam pattern superimposed on the target area.

The total azimuthal coverage was from 18° to 49.7°. The system normally detected missiles or satellites launched from Kapustin Yar at a nominal range of 800 nautical miles (1,500 km); it tracked one type of missile out as far as 1,625 nautical miles (3,010 km). The missiles and satellites were not sensed at their maximum detectable range because the coverage of the fixed beam configuration did not conform with the test range layout.

The electrical characteristics of each of the channels were:

             
Frequency ............................... 175-215 megahertz      
Peak power per beam ..................... 1.2 megawatts      
Pulse length ............................ 2000 microseconds     
Pulse repetition rate ................... 30 cycles per second     
Duty cycle (portion of time transmitting) 0.06                        
Beam width (horizontally elongated) ..... 2.5° x 1.8°      
Beam width (vertically elongated) ....... 1° x 2°      
Pulse compression ratio ................. 100:1         
Range accuracy .......................... within 5 nmi (9 km)                  

To illustrate how the capability of the system is calculated, we can take typical logs which show channel 4, for example, operating with the following parameters:

 
Peak power output .............. 1.0 megawatt    
Minimum discernible signal ..... 130 decibels below one milliwatt             
Frequency ...................... 192 megahertz                 

Channel 4's maximum range of intercept capability for a target one square meter in cross section is then determined by using these parameters in the radar range equation

$$R = \left[ \frac {P_t \, G^2 \, \lambda^2 \, A }{(4 \, \pi)^3 \, \sigma_{min}} \right] ^{1 \over 4} \,\!$$

where:

- $R \,\!$ is the range in meters
- $P_t \,\!$ is the peak power transmitted in watts
- $G \,\!$ is the antenna gain over isotropic (omnidirectional) radiator
- $\lambda \,\!$ is the wavelength in meters
- $\sigma_{min} \,\!$ is the minimum discernible signal in watts
- $A \,\!$ is the target size in square meters

Substituting,

$$\lambda = \frac {c} {f} \,\!$$

where:

- $c \,\!$ is the speed of light in meters per second
- $f \,\!$ is the frequency in hertz (1/s)

$$\lambda = \frac {3 \times 10^8 \, \mathrm{m/s}} {192 \times 10^6 \, \mathrm{Hz}} = 1.56 \, \mathrm{m} \,\!$$

converting.

$$\sigma_{min} = -130 \, \mathrm{dBm} = 10 ^{-130/10} \, \mathrm{mW} = 10 ^ {-16} \, \mathrm{W} \,\!$$

and

$$R = \left[ \frac {10^6 \, \mathrm{W} \times 5000^2 \times \left(1.56 \, \mathrm{m} \right)^2 \times 1 \, \mathrm{m}^2} {12.57^3 \times 10^{-16} \, \mathrm{W}} \right] ^{1 \over 4} \,\!$$

Range = 4,184 kilometres (2,260 nmi).

Sightings made by the fixed-beam system included vertical firings (for upper-atmosphere research vehicles or booster checkout ), ballistic missiles fired to the nominal 650-nautical-mile (1,200 km), 1,050-nautical-mile (1,940 km), and 2,000-nautical-mile (3,700 km) impact areas, launches of Cosmos satellites, orbiting satellites, and natural abnormalities such as ionospheric disturbances or aurora.

== Measurements and processing ==
Data on target missiles or satellites were recorded in each radar channel by photographing a five-inch (127 mm) intensity-modulated oscilloscope with the camera shutter open on a 35 mm film moving approximately five inches per minute. The range of an individual target was represented by its location across the width of the film, the time by a dotdash code along the length. In addition to this positional information, the target's approximate radial velocity (velocity in the direction of observation) was determined by measuring the Doppler frequency shift in the radar signal when it returned. The doppler shift was found to within 500 cycles by determining which of eighteen frequency filters covering successive bands 500 cycles per second wide passed the return signal. This measurement of radial velocity ran from -4 to -f-4 nautical miles (7 km) per second in increments of 0.219-nautical-mile (0.406 km). All these data, together with the elevation and azimuth of the observing beam, were automatically converted to serial form, encoded in standard teleprinter code, and punched on paper tape for transmission.

Data was thus received at Wright-Patterson Foreign Technology Division (FTD) first by teleprinter and then on film, the latter accompanied by logs giving data on the target as read by site personnel and data on equipment performance such as peak transmitted power, frequency, and receiver sensitivity. Upon arrival, the film when was edited and marked to facilitate reading on the "Oscar" (preliminary processing) equipment. Targets were sorted by differences in range and rate of range change, and the returns on each were numbered in time sequence.

The FTD Oscar equipment consisted of a film reader which gave time and range data in analog form, a converter unit which changed them to digital form, and an IBM printing card punch which received the digital data. The Oscar equipment and human operator thus generated a deck of IBM cards for computer processing which contains the history of each target's position through time.

The first step in the computer processing was to translate Oscar units into actual radar range, "Z" (Greenwich mean) time, and beam number, the latter fixing the azimuth and elevation of the return. During this first step, three separate quality-control checks were made on each IBM card to eliminate erroneous data.

Those observations that succeed in passing all these tests were taken to the second step of computer processing, with fitting of a second-degree polynomial curve to the raw range/time data in accordance with least squares criteria. In this method, a mathematical function was fit to best approximate a series of observations where the sum of squares of its residuals (deviations from the raw data) was least. If there was systematic irregularity in the reliability of the data, the residuals were weighted accordingly.

A standard deviation from this curve was established, and any raw datum point showing a deviation as large as three times the standard was discarded. Then second-degree curves were similarly fitted to the azimuth/time and elevation/time data. The three second-degree polynomials - for range/time, azimuth/time, and elevation/time - were used to generate a value for position and velocity at mean time of observation, and on the basis of these values an initial estimate of the elliptical trajectory was made.

In computing the elliptical path, the earth is physically considered a rotating homogeneous sphere and geometrically considered an ellipsoid -that is, its equatorial bulge is ignored in the gravitational computation but not with respect to intersections of its surface. An ellipse not intersecting the Earth's surface represents a satellite orbit; one intersecting the Earth's surface describes a trajectory above the point of intersection.

The parameters of the ellipse are iterated with the computer, establishing a best-fit ellipse constrained by a weighted least-squares criterion. Along this ellipse the target's track is computed -the history through time of latitude, longitude, altitude, and such velocity and angular parameters as may be of interest. A missile's actual range is probably shorter than that of its computed trajectory because of its non-elliptical thrusting path and atmospheric drag after its reentry. The difference is on the order of 10-nautical-mile (19 km) to 25 nautical miles (46 km) for short and medium range missiles, 50-nautical-mile (93 km) for ICBMs.

== Laredo, Texas ==
GE and the Air Force recognized a need to conduct further research, development and testing that would not have been possible at the operational site in Turkey, so a similar FPS-17 was installed near Laredo, Texas, to facilitate that work. The location was sometimes known as Laredo Test Site, Laredo Tracking Site, or Laredo AFS, but is not to be confused with Laredo AFB. The site was declared operational on 29 February 1956 and a mechanical tracker, designated AN/FPS-78 was added around 1960. The site shut down in 1962 or 1963. Some documents claim Laredo was the first FPS-17 but this appears to derive from the period when the existence of Diyarbakir was a closely held secret.

The Laredo FPS-17 underwent numerous reconfigurations over time. The antenna reflector was the same as Diyarbakir’s initial FPS-17 antenna, but the feed horn numbers and configurations changed several times (it is a curiosity that none of the three FPS-17 sites were exactly alike). Laredo tracked missiles from White Sands and conducted experiments in detection, meteor effects, ionospheric propagation effects and hardware testing.

== Shemya Island, Alaska ==
Soviet rocket tests to Kamchatka during the late 1950s increased interest in Shemya Island, Alaska at the western Aleutians as a location for monitoring missile tests from the far northeastern Soviet Union. Old site facilities were rehabilitated and new ones constructed on the island, including a large detection radar (AN/FPS-17), which went into operation in 1960. Each of three antenna reflectors were similar to the initial FPS-17 at Diyarbakir but employed a different feed horn array and beam scanning method. In 1961, the AN/FPS-80 tracking radar was constructed nearby. Blue Fox refers to a modification of the AN/FPS-80 tracking radar to the AN/FPS-80(M) configuration in 1964. These radars were closed in the 1970s when the Cobra Dane phased array radar was built to monitor missile tests. Shemya was redesignated from an Air Force station to an Air Force base in 1968.

The AN/FPS-17 Detection Radar at the Shemya AFB became operational in May 1960, and the AN/FPS-80 Tracking Radar became operational on April 1, 1962.

Blue Nine refers to the project which produced the AN/FPS-79 Tracking Radar Set built by General Electric, used with the Air Force 466L Electromagnetic Intelligence System (ELINT).

== Aftermath ==
The Diyarbakir space surveillance site operated a detection radar (FPS-17) and a tracking radar (FPS-79) throughout the 1960s and 1970s. If a new space object was sensed by the detection radar's fans, then the tracking radar could be oriented to achieve lock-on and tracking. The orientation was governed by knowledge of the appropriate "normal" object's astrodynamic laws of motion, or by an assumption as to launch point. Thus, if an unknown was detected, and if it followed an unusual path, it was unlikely that it could, or would, be tracked. Furthermore, the director of the radar could make a decision that the unknown object detected is not of interest (because of the location of the FPS-17 fan penetration or because of the lack of prior information on a possible new launch). In the absence of detection fan penetration (the fan had a rather limited coverage), the FPS-79 tracking radar was tasked to follow other space objects on a schedule provided by the Space Defense Center, and again there was almost no likelihood that an anomalistic object could, or would, be tracked.

The success of the FPS-17 technology led directly to the development of the larger and more powerful Ballistic Missile Warning System (BMEWS). BMEWS detection and tracking radars were prototyped on Trinidad Island and the operational installations were made at Thule, Greenland; Clear, Alaska; and Fylingdales Moor, UK.

== See also ==
- List of radars
- List of military electronics of the United States
