= Two-line element set =

Orbital data format

A two-line element set (TLE, or more rarely 2LE) or three-line element set (3LE) is a data format encoding a list of orbital elements of an Earth-orbiting object for a given point in time, the epoch. Using a suitable prediction formula, the state (position and velocity) at any point in the past or future can be estimated to some accuracy. The TLE data representation is specific to the simplified perturbations models (SGP, SGP4, SDP4, SGP8 and SDP8), so any algorithm using a TLE as a data source must implement one of the SGP models to correctly compute the state at a time of interest. TLEs can describe the trajectories only of Earth-orbiting objects. TLEs are widely used as input for projecting the future orbital tracks of space debris for purposes of characterizing "future debris events to support risk analysis, close approach analysis, collision avoidance maneuvering" and forensic analysis.

The format was originally intended for punched cards, encoding a set of elements on two standard 80-column cards. This format was eventually replaced by text files as punch card systems became obsolete, with each set of elements written to two 69-column ASCII lines preceded by a title line. The United States Space Force tracks all detectable objects in Earth orbit, creating a corresponding TLE for each object, and makes publicly available TLEs for many of the space objects on the websites Space Track and Celestrak, holding back or obfuscating data on many military or classified objects. The TLE format is a de facto standard for distribution of an Earth-orbiting object's orbital elements.

A TLE set may include a title line preceding the element data, so each listing may take up three lines in the file, in which case the TLE is referred to as a three-line element set (3LE), instead of a two-line element set (2LE). The title is not required, as each data line includes a unique object identifier code.

== History ==
In the early 1960s, Max Lane developed mathematical models for predicting the locations of satellites based on a minimal set of data elements. His first paper on the topic, published in 1965, introduced the Analytical Drag Theory, which concerned itself primarily with the effects of drag caused by a spherically symmetric non-rotating atmosphere. Joined by K. Cranford, the two published an improved model in 1969 that added various harmonic effects due to Earth-Moon-Sun interactions and various other inputs.

Lane's models were widely used by the military and NASA starting in the late 1960s. The improved version became the standard model for NORAD in the early 1970s, which ultimately led to the creation of the TLE format. At the time there were two formats designed for punch cards, an "internal format" that used three cards encoding complete details for the satellite, including name and other data, and the two card "transmission format" that listed only those elements that were subject to change. The latter saved on cards and produced smaller decks when updating the databases.

Cranford continued to work on the modelling, eventually leading Lane to publish Spacetrack Report #2 detailing the Air Force General Perturbation theory, or AFGP4. The paper also described two simplified versions of the system, IGP4 which used a simplified drag model, and SGP4 (Simplified General Perturbations) which used IGP4's drag model along with a simplified gravity model. The differences between the three models were slight for most objects. One year later, Spacetrack Report #3 was released, including full FORTRAN source code for the SGP4 model. This quickly became the de facto standard model, both in the industry as well as the astronomy field.

Shortly after the publication of Report #3, NASA began posting elements for a variety of visible and other well known objects in their periodic NASA Prediction Bulletins, which consisted of the transmission format data in printed form. After trying for some time to convince NASA to release these in electronic form, T.S. Kelso took matters into his own hands and began manually copying the listings into text files which he distributed through his CelesTrak bulletin board system. This revealed a problem in NASA's checksum system, which was eventually determined to be caused by a change in the representation of the plus character (+) on punched cards when NORAD upgraded their UNIVAC computers to use the EBCDIC character set rather than BCD. This problem went away when Kelso began to receive data directly from NORAD in 1989.

The SGP4 model was later extended with corrections for deep space objects, creating SDP4, which used the same TLE input data. Over the years a number of more advanced prediction models have been created, but these have not seen widespread use. This is due to the TLE not containing the additional information needed by some of these formats, which makes it difficult to find the elements needed to take advantages of the improved model. More subtly, the TLE data is massaged in a fashion to improve the results when used with the SGP series models, which may cause the predictions of other models to be less accurate than SGP when used with common TLEs. The only new model to see widespread use is SGP8/SDP8, which were designed to use the same data inputs and are relatively minor corrections to the SGP4 model.

== Format ==
Originally there were two data formats used with the SGP models, one containing complete details on the object known as the "internal format", and a second known as the "transmission format" that was used to provide updates to that data.

The internal format used three 80-column punch cards. Each card started with a card number, 1, 2 or 3, and ended with the letter "G". For this reason, the system was often known as the "G-card format". In addition to the orbital elements, the G-card included various flags like the launching country and orbit type (geostationary, etc.), calculated values like the perigee altitude and visual magnitude, and a 38-character comments field.

The transmission format is essentially a cut-down version of the G-card format to allow the important information it onto two cards, removing any data that is not subject to change on a regular basis, or data that can be calculated using other values. For instance, the perigee altitude from the G-card is not included as this can be calculated from the other elements. What remains is the set of data needed to update the original G-card data as additional measurements are made. The data is fit into 69 columns and does not include a trailing character.

TLEs are simply the transmission format data rendered as ASCII text instead of punch cards. Most TLE files now include a simplified third line containing just the name, these are known as "3LE" files, while those lacking the name lines are "2LE"s. The other information from the original G format is not present in modern TLEs.

An example TLE for the International Space Station:

ISS (ZARYA)
1 25544U 98067A   08264.51782528 -.00002182  00000-0 -11606-4 0  2927
2 25544  51.6416 247.4627 0006703 130.5360 325.0288 15.72125391563537

The meaning of this data is as follows:

=== Title line (optional) ===

Field	Columns	Content	Example
1	01–24	Satellite name	ISS (ZARYA)

If present, the TLE is a three-line element set (3LE).

If not, the TLE is a two-line element set (2LE).

=== Line 1 ===

Field	Columns	Content	Example
1	01	Line number	1
2	03–07	Satellite catalog number	25544
3	08	Classification (U: unclassified, C: classified, S: secret)	U
4	10–11	International Designator (last two digits of launch year) Can be left blank	98
5	12–14	International Designator (launch number of the year) Can be left blank	067
6	15–17	International Designator (piece of the launch) Can be left blank	A
7	19–20	Epoch year (last two digits of year)	08
8	21–32	Epoch (day of the year and fractional portion of the day)	264.51782528
9	34–43	First derivative of mean motion; the ballistic coefficient (rev/day, per day)	-.00002182
10	45–52	Second derivative of mean motion (rev/day³, decimal point assumed)	00000-0
11	54–61	B*, the drag term, or radiation pressure coefficient (units of 1/(Earth radii), decimal point assumed)	-11606-4
12	63	Ephemeris type (always zero; only used in undistributed TLE data)	0
13	65–68	Element set number. Incremented when a new TLE is generated for this object.	292
14	69	Checksum (modulo 10)	7

=== Line 2 ===

Field	Columns	Content	Example
1	01	Line number	2
2	03–07	Satellite Catalog number	25544
3	09–16	Inclination (degrees)	51.6416
4	18–25	Right ascension of the ascending node (degrees), in the ECI reference frame, measured from the vernal point	247.4627
5	27–33	Eccentricity (unitless, decimal point assumed)	0006703
6	35–42	Argument of perigee (degrees)	130.5360
7	44–51	Mean anomaly (degrees)	325.0288
8	53–63	Mean motion (revolutions per day)	15.72125391
9	64–68	Revolution number at epoch (revolutions)	56353
10	69	Checksum (modulo 10)	7

Where decimal points are assumed, they are leading decimal points. The last two symbols in Fields 10 and 11 of the first line give powers of 10 to apply to the preceding decimal. Thus, for example, Field 11 (-11606-4) translates to −0.11606E−4 (−0.11606×10^{−4}).

The checksums for each line are calculated by adding all numerical digits on that line, including the line number. One is added to the checksum for each negative sign (-) on that line. All other non-digit characters are ignored.

For a body in a typical low Earth orbit, the accuracy that can be obtained with the SGP4 orbit model is on the order of 1 km within a few days of the epoch of the element set. The term "low orbit" may refer to either the altitude (minimal or global) or orbital period of the body. Historically, the SGP algorithms defines low orbit as an orbit of less than 225 minutes.

In two-digit Epoch Years, the years 1957 through 1999 are represented by the numbers 57 through 99. Numbers from 00 to 56 represent the years 2000–2056.

The activation of the Space Fence in 2020 resulted in a great increase in the number of objects being tracked as the Space Fence's S-band RADAR is more sensitive than the radars used by the Air Force Space Surveillance System that previously had generated the raw data used for TLEs. The increase in the number of objects tracked meant that Satellite Catalog Numbers may no longer fit in the five-digit field available in traditional TLEs. A secondary cause for the increase in Satellite Catalog Numbers was the commercialization of space and break-up events and collisions that have created debris objects. Adaptations of the TLE were considered to extend the number of encodable Satellites within the TLE but instead a new format, the CCSDS OMM (Orbit Mean-Elements Message), started being used in 2020 that supports nine-digit Satellite Catalog Numbers. The legacy TLE format will continue to use five-digit Satellite Catalog Numbers.

As a stop-gap measure for systems which can only take in five characters for the Satellite Catalog number, the Space Force developed the "Alpha-5" numbering scheme, where the highest digit can be replaced with an alphabetical character to represent higher numbers from 100000–339999. The letters "I" and "O" are skipped to avoid confusion with the numbers "1" and "0". For example, the number 100000 can be represented as "A0000" in the Alpha-5 format, 110000 is represented by "B0000", up to the highest number 339999 which is represented as "Z9999". However, using the nine-digit Satellite Catalog number is preferred.
