= Ronald Reagan Space and Missile Test Range =

Missile test range in the Marshall Islands

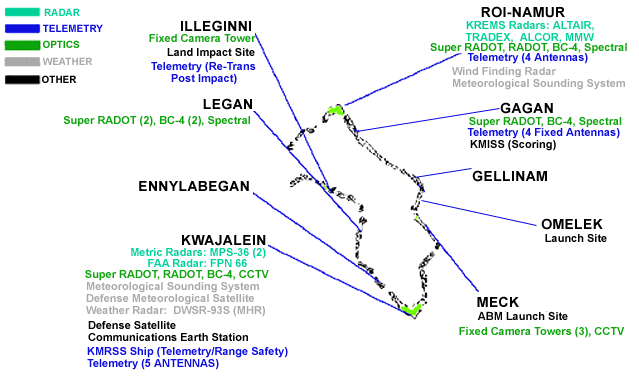
Kwajalein infrastructure and RTS headquarters

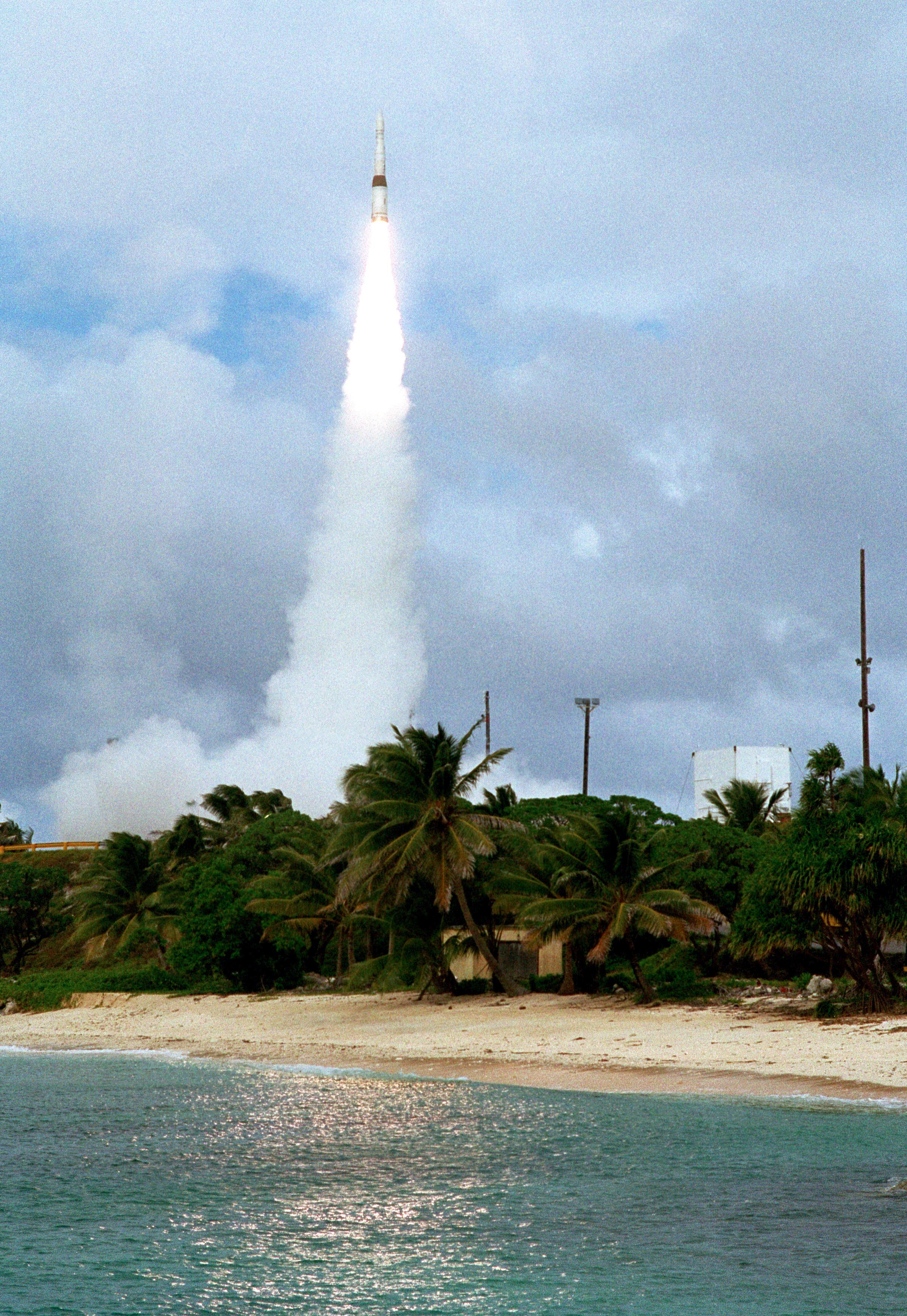
An exoatmospheric kill vehicle (kinetic penetrator, mid-phase) is launched from Meck Island on 3 December 2001

The Ronald Reagan Space and Missile Test Range, commonly referred to as the Reagan Test Range (formerly Ronald Reagan Ballistic Missile Defense Test Site), is a missile test range in the Marshall Islands (Pacific Ocean). It covers about 750,000 square miles (1,900,000 km^{2}) and includes rocket launch sites at the Kwajalein Atoll (on multiple islands), Wake Island, and Aur Atoll. It primarily functions as a test facility for U.S. missile defense and space research programs. The Reagan Test Site is under the command of the US Army Kwajalein Atoll, or USAKA (pronounced /uːˈsɑːkə/).

== Purpose and facilities ==
The facility is part of the Defense Major Range and Test Facility Base. They provide range instrumentation, missile launch facilities, mission control center, range safety, meteorological support, and support space operations. As of 2015, the facility's budget was US$182 million. The site hosts a suite of unique instrumentation, located on eight islands throughout the Kwajalein Atoll. This instrumentation includes a comprehensive suite of precision metric and signature radars, optical sensors, telemetry receiving stations, and impact scoring assets. RTS provides both mobile and fixed ground and flight safety instrumentation. The Pentagon lease for the islands of the Kwajalein Atoll extends through 2066.

Equipment installed at the test site includes various tracking radars (such as the Ground-Based Radar Prototype), stationary and mobile telemetry, optical recording equipment and a secure fiberoptic data network via the HANTRU-1 undersea cable. The Reagan Test Site also serves as a tracking station for crewed space flight and NASA research projects.

Launch activities at the test site included ballistic missile tests (Gagan Island, 9.28716°N 167.536916°E; Gellinam Island, 9.09857°N 167.7282°E), ABM interception tests (Meck Island, 9.006136°N 167.726964°E), and meteorological sounding rockets. The Kwajalein Atoll used to host a commercial spaceport for SpaceX at Omelek Island at which it launched its Falcon 1 rocket. (9°2′52.30″N 167°44′34.80″E). On September 28th, 2008, Falcon 1 became the first privately funded and developed liquid-propellant rocket to reach earth orbit.

During the 1980s Soviet small boat teams (Naval Spetsnaz: Dolfin) operated in the area. Ex-CIA officer and a former senior NCO of Military Assistance Command-Vietnam Studies and Observations Group (MACV-SOG) Billy Waugh was formally named Deputy Chief of Police. His duties included tracking the small boat teams to prevent them for stealing U.S. missile technology that fell in the Kwajalein Missile Range.

== Population ==
There are about 2,500 permanent residents of Kwajalein, including 1,200 employees of Bechtel and Lockheed Martin's Kwajalein Range Services and more than 800 dependents. The Bechtel employees are located on 11 sites spread across 7,000 miles (11,000 km) and seven time zones. The civilian jobs on the facility are managed under contract by Bechtel. Depending on the job, some positions are unaccompanied. Vehicles are not permitted. Workers on the facility may qualify for tax-exempt status in the United States. The Americans are supported by about 900 Marshallese workers who take a ferry from Ebeye Island to the base. Bechtel provides a wide variety of support services to the Department of Defense and military personnel and their families. These include dining operations, public utilities, medical and dental care, transportation, firefighting, recreational activities, youth and education services, retail, religious services, and newspaper, radio, and TV access.

A Catholic and a Presbyterian chaplain are employed by Bechtel. There are also religious services available for members of The Church of Jesus Christ of Latter-day Saints.

== Location ==
The mission control center, along with most of the personnel and infrastructure, is located at the Kwajalein Atoll in the Marshall Islands. Eleven of the atoll's islands are operated by the U.S. military under a long term lease (through 2066) with the Republic of the Marshall Islands.

== Climate threat ==
According to a report commissioned by the Department of Defense, the site is expected to be entirely submerged by seawater at least once annually by 2035.

On January 20, 2024, the base sustained significant damage and flooding caused by large waves.

== History ==
Previous names for the installation include:

- Naval Station Kwajalein (Post World War II–1959)
- Pacific Missile Range Facility, Kwajalein (1959–1964)
- Kwajalein Test Site (1964–1968)
- Kwajalein Missile Range (1968–1986)
- United States Army Kwajalein Atoll (1986–1991)
- Kwajalein Missile Range (1991–1999)
- Ronald Reagan Ballistic Missile Defense Test Site (1999–2026)
- Ronald Reagan Space and Missile Test Range (2026–present)

== See also ==
- Naval Base Kwajalein
- Nike-Hydac
- Project Nike

== Notes ==
This article incorporates content from United States government web sites that is in the public domain.
