= Satellite Catalog Number =

NORAD satellite identifier

Two-line element set with the SATCAT number (25544 - the International Space Station) visible as the second term on both lines.

The Satellite Catalog Number (SATCAT), also known as NORAD Catalog Number, NORAD ID, USSPACECOM object number, SSN number, SCC number, and SSC number, is a sequential five-digit number assigned by the United States Space Command (USSPACECOM), and previously the North American Aerospace Defense Command (NORAD). Numbers are assigned in the order discovery to all artificial objects tracked in earth's orbit, in contrast to the other primary method of identifying on-orbit satellites, the international designator which assigns numbers based purely off of launch dates. For example, catalog number 1 is the Sputnik 1 launch vehicle, and the Sputnik 1 satellite assigned catalog number 2. The SATCAT number is the primary identifier of the specific object described in a two-line element set.

== Operation ==
There are thousands of objects orbiting the earth, the vast majority of which cannot be tracked in anywhere close to real time. The SATCAT number serves as a unique identifier for the thousands of objects larger than 10 centimetres (3.9 in) in diameter tracked on-orbit by the US Space Force. As objects orbit, they pass in view of various US Space Surveillance Network sensors. Detected objects are initially given an analyst object number and are used for internal tracking and analysis at various US Space Force organizations. Post launch orbits are similarly used to track a launch vehicle prior to it entering orbit. Once conclusively established as on orbit and associated with a launch or existing object, temporary objects are given a standard SATCAT number. Detected objects are issued a number sequentially, future detections of the same object use the number as an identifier to maintain consistency. Originally objects were limited to a 5-digit number due to limitations in the TLE format. The allowable range has been expanded using a 5-character "alpha-5" alphanumeric designator. Under this system, the first digit is replaced with a letter for numbers greater than 99999 - each letter representing a 2-digit number (i.e. A0000 = 100,000). This keeps the 5-character limitation imposed by existing tools and systems, but expands the number of distinct objects that can be represented. For clarity, the letters "I" and "O" are not used.

Standard Satellite Catalog Numbering Scheme
| From | To | Description |
|---|---|---|
| 1 | 69,999 | Satellite catalog |
| 70,000 | 79,999 | Expected post-launch orbits |
| 80,000 | 89,999 | Analyst objects |
| 90,000 | 99,999 | Uncorrelated tracks |
| 100,000 | 269,999 | Expanded satellite catalog |
| 270,000 | 339,999 | Additional analyst objects. |

The catalog exists to track all objects identified and are not reused. As a result, numbers are given and permanently associated with inactive, passivated, or defunct satellites, expended upper stages, miscellaneous debris, objects that have left earth's orbit, and objects that have deorbited. Objects are assigned a number based on when they were first identified, and can appear out of order when debris is created after a launch has occurred or when space surveillance network doesn't identify all objects before another launch occurs. This is in contrast to the International Designator, which assigns a number based exclusively on launch date.

Example numbers and objects
| SATCAT Number | International Designator | Object | Notes |
|---|---|---|---|
| 5 | 1958-002B | Vanguard 1 | Oldest tracked object still on orbit |
| 114 | 1959-014A | Luna 2 | First manmade object to reach the moon |
| 20580 | 1990-037B | Hubble Space Telescope | |
| 25544 | 1998-067A | International Space Station | |
| 33665 | 1999-025DFA | Fengyun-1C debris | One of over 3,438 pieces of debris detected after a defunct weather satellite was destroyed in a Chinese anti-satellite missile test |
| 48274 | 2021-035A | Tiangong | |
| 58556 | 2023-193D | ZQ-2 Rocket Body | Second stage of the inaugural launch of the ZQ-2E |
| 69999 | 1958-002D | Vanguard rocket debris | Unspecified Vanguard rocket debris associated with the launch of Vanguard 1. Final object to be numbered under the original scheme |
| 100000 | 2026-067CY | Saramago | Portuguese cubesat launched on Transporter-16 rideshare. The first object numbered under the new scheme - object identified and given a number several months after the launch |

Space Forces Space makes the catalog publicly accessible via space-track.org and the 18th Space Defense Squadron. Classified US military and intelligence satellites are generally assigned a number, cover name (USA designator), and launch date but are not updated further. The catalog was developed primarily for military purposes, but because it is published online for free, has become a critical source of information for civil and commercial operators throughout the world. It is currently the worlds most comprehensive catalog of space situational awareness data.

== History ==
Initially, the catalog was maintained by NORAD as a part of its ballistic missile defense efforts. From 1985 onwards, USSPACECOM took over operation of the catalog. From 2002 to 2019, USSPACECOM was disestablished and merged with the United States Strategic Command (USSTRATCOM) until being reestablished with the founding of the US Space Force. A commercial equivalent, the Traffic Coordination System for Space (TraCSS) is being developed by the Office of Space Commerce to take over the civilian facing parts of the catalog and replace space-track.org. The effort has been delayed by continued uncertainty in the second Trump administration.

Before 2020, the catalog number was limited to five digits due to the TLE format limitation. Increasing numbers of satellites necessitated expansion and in 2020, Space-Track started to provide data in CCSDS OMM (Orbit Mean-Elements Message) format, increasing the maximum catalog number to 999,999,999. Object 100000 - the first to use the new numbering system - was cataloged on 11 July 2026.

== Statistics ==
As of September 13, 2026, the catalog listed 70,661 objects, including 17,844 satellites that had been launched into orbit since 1957 - of which 12,924 were still active. In addition USSPACECOM was also tracking 16,600 analyst objects. Analyst objects are variably tracked and in constant flux, so their catalog and element set data are not published. As of September 12, 2023 ESA estimated there were about 36,500 pieces of orbiting debris that are large enough for USSPACECOM to track.

== See also ==
- International Designator, also known as a COSPAR ID
- Space debris
- Two-line element set (TLE)
- United States Space Surveillance Network
