= Anclote Missile Tracking Annex =

Coordinates: 28°11′19.44″N 82°47′39.00″W

External image
- radar station

The Anclote Missile Tracking Annex was a Cold War radar station of 49.65 acres (20.09 ha) in Pasco County, Florida adjacent to the Alachua Pinellas community at the mouth of the Anclote River near Tampa. The Air Force Systems Command military installation, site D 3 of the Eglin Range Complex, was used for development tests, e.g., 1950s/1960s Regulus II supersonic cruise missile firings from the Venice missile launch complex.

The Anclote site "phased down" 1 May - 1 July 1969.
