= Solid State Phased Array Radar System =

American radar network

Coverage of the Ballistic Missile Early Warning System (BMEWS), which was upgraded to the Solid State Phased Array Radar System (SSPARS)

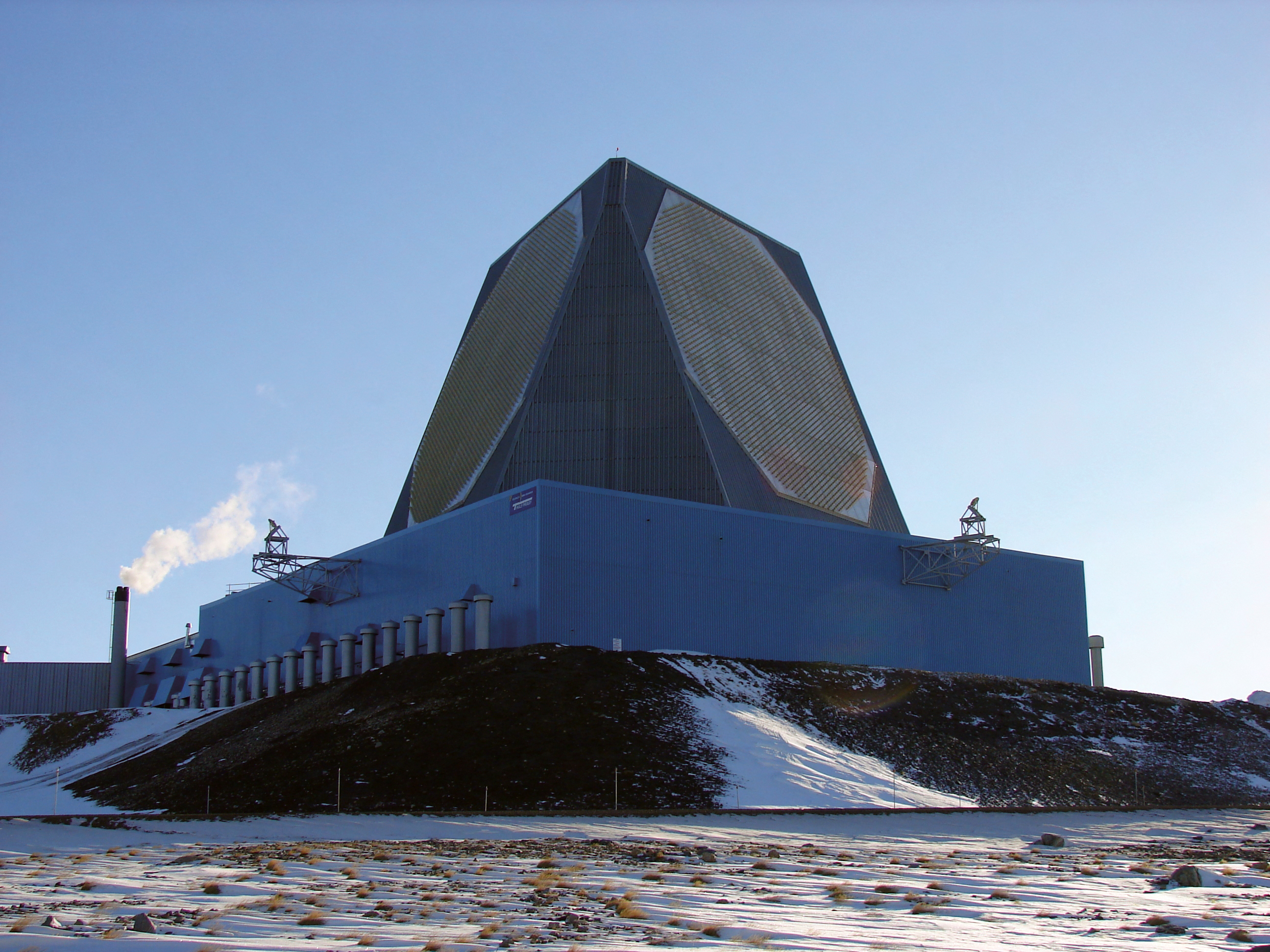
AN/FPS-132 Upgraded Early Warning Radar (UEWR) unit at Pituffik Space Base in Greenland

The Solid State Phased Array Radar System (SSPARS) is a network of fixed-position, solid-state phased array radar systems used for long-range early warning and space surveillance. SSPARS provides critical missile defense data primarily for the United States, Canada, and the United Kingdom.

As of 2026, six of the seven existing SSPARS installations are equipped with the AN/FPS-132 Upgraded Early Warning Radar (UEWR) radar system. The AN/FPS-132 radar unit is 120 feet (37 m) in overall height and has two or three faces, where each face covers an azimuth angle of 120 degrees. The radars operate at ultra high frequency (UHF) and can detect objects out to 3,000 miles (4,800 km).

The SSPARS network replaced the Ballistic Missile Early Warning System (BMEWS), which had been fully operational since 15 January 1964. The first iteration of SSPARS was the Precision Acquisition Vehicle Entry Phased-Array Warning System (PAVE PAWS), which came online in 2001. The PAVE PAWS system was in turn upgraded to the UEWR system, which became fully operational in 2014.

While other nations possess long-range tracking systems for monitoring ballistic missiles and aircraft (such as Russia's Voronezh, Israel's Green Pine, and Australia's JORN), SSPARS systems are currently only operational in the US, UK, Greenland, Qatar, and Taiwan.

== Classification of radar systems ==
Under the JETDS, all U.S. military radar and tracking systems are assigned a unique identifying alphanumeric designation. The letters "AN" (for Army-Navy) are placed ahead of a three-letter code. The first letter of the three-letter code denotes the type of platform hosting the electronic device, where A=Aircraft, F=Fixed (land-based), G=Ground, S=Ship-mounted, and T=Ground transportable. The second letter indicates the type of equipment, where P=Radar (pulsed), Q=Sonar, R=Radio, and S=Satellite. The third letter indicates the function or purpose of the device, where C=Communications, G=Fire control, R=Receiving, S=Search, and T=Transmitting. Thus, the AN/FPS-132 represents the 132nd design of an Army-Navy "Fixed, Radar, Search" electronic device.

== History ==
The SSPARS network replaced the Ballistic Missile Early Warning System (BMEWS), which had been fully operational since 15 January 1964.

The first iteration of SSPARS was the Precision Acquisition Vehicle Entry Phased-Array Warning System (PAVE PAWS), which employed a pair of Raytheon AN/FPS-115 phased-array radars at each site to cover an azimuth angle of 240 degrees. Installation of the SSPARS hardware to replace BMEWS commenced at the first site (Thule Air Base, now Pituffik Space Base) in November 1984. The last of the five original SSPAR sites (Clear Air Force Station, now Clear Space Force Station) became operational in 2001, and the old mechanical BMEWS radars (three AN/FPS-50 detection radars and one AN/FPS-92 tracking radar) were fully deactivated in February 2002.

In 2012, the SSPARS network began replacing its older AN/FPS-115 units with the AN/FPS-132 UEWR units. The installations at Clear Space Force Station and Cape Cod Space Force Station began the UEWR modernization in 2012 and 2013, respectively. The remaining sites (Beale Air Force Base, RAF Fylingdales, and Pituffik Space Base) were upgraded and integrated into the Ballistic Missile Defense System (BMDS) in 2014.

== United States ==
AN/FPS-132 Upgraded Early Warning Radar (UEWR) unit at Cape Cod Space Force Station in Massachusetts

The SSPARS network is a foundational component of global missile early warning, primarily for the United States, Canada, and the United Kingdom. The network consists of five main installations:

- Cape Cod Space Force Station in Massachusetts, operated by the 6th Space Warning Squadron;
- Beale Air Force Base in California, operated by the 7th Space Warning Squadron;
- Clear Space Force Station in Alaska, operated by the 13th Space Warning Squadron;
- Pituffik Space Base in Greenland, operated by the 12th Space Warning Squadron;
- RAF Fylingdales, operated by the United Kingdom Space Command.

All five of these sites are equipped with the UEWR radar system, and all of these units report to Mission Delta 4 of the United States Space Force.

The radars of this network also serve a secondary mission in space domain awareness (detection and tracking of satellites and space debris orbiting the Earth) and space object identification. The radars detect, identify, and track objects in near-Earth orbit out to a range of 3,000 miles (4,800 km). When an object penetrates the radar's coverage, the radar tracks the object to identify it as a ballistic missile or space object. In this capacity, they function as auxiliary sensors of the United States Space Surveillance Network (SSN). The SSN is a much larger network, consisting of more than thirty radars and optical telescopes located throughout the world, as well as six satellites in orbit.

== United Kingdom ==
AN/FPS-132 Upgraded Early Warning Radar (UEWR) unit at RAF Fylingdales in England

There is currently one operational SSPARS site in the United Kingdom. It is located at RAF Fylingdales, a Royal Air Force station on Snod Hill in the North York Moors, England. Equipped with the UEWR radar system, it is operated by the United Kingdom Space Command. As part of an intelligence-sharing arrangement, data collected at RAF Fylingdales is shared with the United States.

== Qatar ==
There is currently one operational SSPARS site in Qatar. It is located in Umm Dahal, just south of Lehnaizeeba in Al Khor municipality. In a 2013 agreement worth roughly $1.1 billion, Qatar purchased the SSPARS system with the UEWR unit from the United States. The facility became fully operational in 2019.

On 28 February 2026, during the Iran war, the system was damaged in retaliatory strikes on US-associated military installations in Qatar. Damage to at least one of the system’s three arrays was confirmed by satellite imagery; the Iranian drones used to strike it cost an estimated $20,000 to $60,000 per unit. The SSPARS site in Qatar was a cornerstone of the strategic early-warning network for the US and its allies. Compromising it has severely degraded the Pentagon's ability to track incoming missiles. While some military analysts noted that rapid repairs are underway, the defense authorities have not provided an official estimate for when this installation will be restored to full operational capability. Regional missile defense is currently relying on alternative missile defense assets, such as Aegis-equipped destroyers.

== Taiwan ==
Taiwan operates a highly customized, ultra-powerful variant of the SSPARS radar network. The site is located in Nanzhuang, Miaoli County, Taiwan. Construction was completed in 2012, and the system became operational in 2013. This site is uniquely modified to track long-range airborne and ballistic threats, as well as surface naval vessels moving across regional waters. Because the facility sits at an altitude of over 8,600 feet (2,600 m) above sea level, its elevated horizon significantly reduces blind spots. Its 360-degree tracking field provides comprehensive early warning across East and Southeast Asia. The Taiwan site is the only SSPARS site that does not utilize the UEWR technology. The maximum detection range of its AN/FPS-115 PAVE PAWS radar system is 3,100 miles (5,000 km). While built and operated under a unique Foreign Military Sales agreement rather than being a direct node in the US network, the facility utilizes the same core hardware and infrastructure managed under the SSPARS architecture.

== Other nations ==
SSPARS systems are currently only operational in the US, UK, Greenland, Qatar, and Taiwan.

Russia and China are the only other nations that possess full-spectrum, global-range tracking systems for missile defense and space domain awareness. China uses an extensive network consisting of ground- and space-based sensors (including a constellation of more than 510 ISTAR satellites). Russia also has a sophisticated network, consisting of EKS (space-based missile warning system using Tundra satellites); Voronezh radar (ground-based long-range phased-array early warning radars); Okno (an optical-electronic space surveillance station designed to detect and catalog objects in high Earth); and Krona and Krona-N (a combined radar-optical space reconnaissance system used for identifying and tracking space targets).

Several nations have advanced independent radar or optical capabilities but rely heavily on data sharing with allies for a complete global picture. Examples include Australia (JORN), Egypt (ESR-32A and ESR-32B), India (Swordfish), Iran (Ghadir), Israel (Green Pine), and Turkey (ALP 100-G, ALP 300-G, and Aselsan EIRS).

== Operators ==
- United States
- United Kingdom
- Qatar
- Taiwan

== See also ==
- List of military electronics of the United States
- List of radars
