= John C. Herbst =

American ace fighter pilot

- John C. "Pappy" Hearst in his personal P-51B Mustang
- Born: September 25, 1909; San Diego North County, California
- Died: July 4, 1946 (aged 36); Del Mar, California
- Burial place: Los Angeles National Cemetery
- Military career
- Allegiance: Canada; United States
- Branch: Royal Canadian Air Force (1941–42); United States Army Air Forces (1942–46)
- Service years: 1941–1946
- Rank: Lieutenant colonel
- Nickname: "Pappy"
- Units: Eagle Squadrons; 23d Fighter Group
- Commands: 74th Fighter Squadron; 445th Flight Test Squadron; Venice Army Airfield
- Conflicts: World War II: China-Burma-India Theater
- Awards: Silver Star; Distinguished Flying Cross (4); Purple Heart; Air Medal (6)

John C. "Pappy" Herbst (September 25, 1909 – July 4, 1946) was an American flying ace of World War II who was officially the second highest-scoring fighter pilot in the China Burma India Theater with 18 confirmed victories scored during 7 months with the 23d Fighter Group. The group commander, David Lee "Tex" Hill, called Herbst "one of the greatest fighter pilots I ever saw."

Often described as "colorful", Herbst was one of the more successful aces of the United States Army Air Forces (USAAF). Herbst first fought with the Royal Canadian Air Force in Europe against German aircraft, possibly downing one. He joined the USAAF as an instructor training fighter pilots stateside. After two years of teaching and intelligence duties, Herbst was sent to China to fight the Japanese. For seven months he led the 74th Fighter Squadron on far-ranging independent missions, operating from advance airfields under crude conditions and in the face of Operation Ichi-Go; a successful Japanese pincer movement. Herbst scored the majority of his kills during so-called "administrative" flights after he had already completed the theater requirement of 100 combat missions. After the war, Herbst toured in an aerobatic demonstration team flying jets. The day after marrying his second wife he crashed during an aerobatic maneuver and died.

== Early life ==
John Coleman Herbst was born in 1909 in San Diego County, California, in rural North County near Palomar Mountain, an area he described as "Rancho Palomar". In his teens, he attended Huntington Park High School in Los Angeles, following which he graduated from the University of Southern California in 1932 with a B.S. degree in petroleum engineering. That same year he earned a private pilot's license. He was married in the 1930s and fathered a son named Tommy in 1933. After graduating USC, Herbst studied law at night at Loyola Law School while working as a petroleum engineer during the day. As a flyer, he joined the Wings Club of New York City, and for business advancement he joined the California Club in Los Angeles.

== World War II ==
In 1941, Herbst was working as a tax consultant for an American oil company when he left civilian life and joined the Royal Canadian Air Force (RCAF) to learn to fly fighters in combat. After training, Herbst was posted to the United Kingdom where he flew in one of the Eagle Squadrons. Herbst may have scored against a Messerschmitt Bf 109 in the Mediterranean Theater of Operations but the kill is unconfirmed. In early 1942, Herbst returned to the U.S. and joined the USAAF as a flight instructor in the Sarasota, Florida, area. After eight months, he transferred to Eglin Field on the Florida coast to work as a test pilot and to solve air combat tactical problems. While Colonel David Lee "Tex" Hill was recuperating on the beach with his wife, he witnessed a daredevil pilot flying dangerous aerobatics very near the water. Hill ordered the unknown pilot grounded for 60 days; the penalty fell on Herbst who was flying in the area at the time. After only 30 days Herbst came to Hill's office to apologize for his stunt flying and to ask for a reprieve from the rest of the punishment. He said, "I can't stand it any longer, Colonel; I've just got to fly." Hill thought Herbst was an excellent candidate for air combat in the China Burma India Theater (CBI), and determined to get the flyer transferred. However, Herbst was assigned to air combat intelligence duties in Washington, D.C. until February 1944 when Herbst's request for combat and Hill's request for Herbst were finally satisfied. Herbst shipped out on February 20, 1944, and disembarked onto Chinese soil on May 7. Herbst was by this time divorced from his first wife.

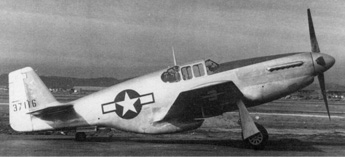
Herbst scored his first USAAF aerial victory in an early P-51 Mustang.

On his arrival in the CBI Theater, Herbst acquired the nickname "Pappy" because of his graying hair, his having a son in school, and his much greater age (34) relative to the other pilots. His ground crew painted a small swastika on his personal fighter aircraft in China, acknowledging his stated German kill though it was not verified. He named his aircraft "Tommy's Dad" in honor of his son. Herbst initially served with the 5th Fighter Group (provisional) without scoring any aerial victories but was transferred to the 76th Fighter Squadron on May 30, 1944, serving as the 23d FG Squadron Operations Officer. While flying a P-51B Mustang gathering weather data north of Kiatow on June 17, 1944, Herbst shot down a lone Nakajima Ki-43 fighter to make his first USAAF kill.

Nine days later on June 26, 1944, Herbst was made commander of the 74th Fighter Squadron, a position he held until February 1945. Herbst converted to P-40N-20 Warhawks as flown by the 74th and soon prevailed again in combat. On August 6 near Hengyang flying against Nakajima Ki-43s, he scored two more USAAF aerial victories to become an ace. The 74th transitioned to P-51C-7 Mustangs in August, and on September 3 Herbst shot down two Japanese aircraft that he reported as Aichi D3A "Val" dive bombers but were probably Mitsubishi Ki-51 "Sonia" models instead. These were the first P-51 victories of the 74th FS. By September 16, Herbst's USAAF tally reached nine victories, five in a Mustang. Herbst appreciated the ability of the P-40 to absorb damage in low-level combat such as close support of infantry. For finer work such as dogfighting, dive bombing and skip bombing, he said, "I'll take the P-51 every time".

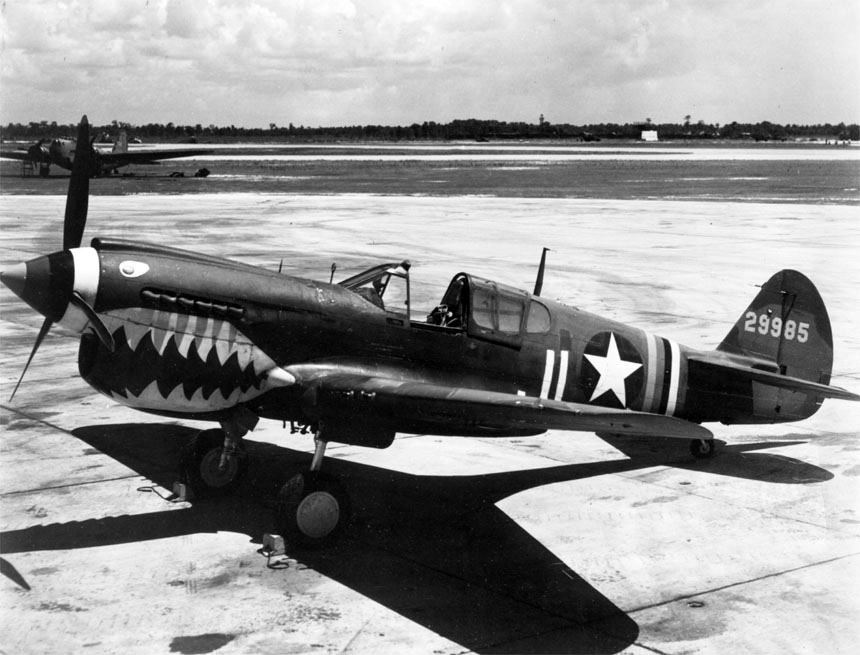
Herbst became a flying ace in a P-40N Warhawk painted with shark's teeth.

Raised to the rank of major in July 1944, Herbst was given free rein in his command of the 74th Squadron. Using the radio call sign "Guerrilla", his squadron fought against Japanese forces conducting Operation Ichi-Go, a successful drive to consolidate communications along rail lines. In his first three months of combat, Herbst completed the required 100 combat sorties and was from that time forward officially restricted to administrative flights. However, Herbst's idea of "administrative" flights was very broad and aggressive, including weather assessment and new pilot training in areas where Japanese aircraft were known to be operating. He flew as an "observer" on combat missions in which he scored against enemy aircraft. Ten or eleven of Herbst's aerial victories were achieved during "administrative" flights.

On one such flight on September 5, 1944, Herbst was ferrying his Mustang fighter to a more sophisticated airfield in Liuliang, China, because the ejector chutes of three of its six machine guns were not working properly and needed expert attention. Herbst encountered two groups of enemy fighters, one group at 10,000 ft (3 km) and another group at a lower altitude. Alone against the hostile force and with only half of his guns working, Herbst made a head-on attack against the top group, killing the leader. His aircraft was hit repeatedly by enemy rounds, shattering the canopy. More enemy aircraft joined the whirling battle against Herbst. With blood from deep scalp cuts partially blinding him, Herbst continued dogfighting, damaging other fighters and probably killing another flight leader. Finally, his last gun stopped working and he dived away to land safely at Kanchow Airfield. The performance earned him a Purple Heart and a Silver Star. Most accounts of this action describe Herbst fighting 32 aircraft total—16 high and 16 low—but Luther "Luke" Kissick, the intelligence officer of Herbst's squadron, writes that there were two flights of 8 at 10,000 ft protecting an unknown number below.

After racking up 18 victories and 2 probables over Japanese aircraft, Herbst was promoted to lieutenant colonel in February 1945. He had personally flown 144 missions and had greatly increased the morale and effectiveness of his squadron. Under his command, the squadron achieved 64 aerial victories and destroyed 162 enemy aircraft on the ground—all without a squadron pilot being killed in aerial combat.

== Postwar ==
Herbst was made commander of Venice Army Airfield in Florida upon his return from China. Venice served as a training base and a prisoner of war camp. He told a reporter that he wanted to fly in the expected invasion of Japan. Instead, the Japanese surrendered and the war was over. During this time, Herbst teamed up with Major Carl T. Sigman to write an article for Popular Science entitled "How Planes Fight the 'White Devil' of the Air'", an explanation of the dangers of ice on aircraft, and how it is countered. On November 9, 1945, Herbst became the commander of 445th Flight Test Squadron based at March Field in Southern California.

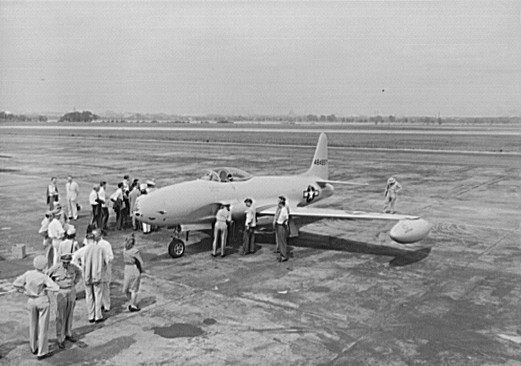
Herbst led an aerobatic demonstration team equipped with Lockheed P-80 Shooting Stars.

In April 1946, Herbst and Robin Olds formed a jet aerobatics demonstration team, flying the Lockheed P-80 Shooting Star under Herbst's leadership. The two pilots performed a coordinated routine that thrilled the crowds at every stop, including an appearance at Washington, D.C. Herbst named his P-80 "Jeanne" in honor of his bride-to-be.

At the age of 36, Herbst married for the second time on July 3, 1946, to Jeanne Eve Murphy, an actress from New York City. The wedding was conducted at the Mission Inn in Riverside, California, near March Field. Herbst's best man was Phil Loofbourrow, who had served with him in China. On the same day, Herbst was assigned to command the 27th Fighter Squadron in the first American all-jet fighter group—1st Fighter Group—flying P-80s.

On July 4, Herbst was fatally injured in front of 30,000 people at the San Diego County Fair when his P-80A-1-LO, 44-85083, part of the 445th Fighter Squadron, 412th Fighter Group, based in March Field, crashed just west of the Del Mar Fairgrounds. Flying in formation with Olds, Herbst crashed in a dry riverbed near the Del Mar Racetrack after his aircraft stalled during an encore of their routine finale in which the pair of P-80s did a loop while configured to land. Olds narrowly avoided the same fate.

Herbst's new wife witnessed the accident, as did his 13-year-old son Tommy. Both rushed to aid in the rescue, but Herbst died shortly after the accident in a nearby naval hospital. He is buried at Los Angeles National Cemetery.

== Awards and decorations ==
Herbst's decorations include:

Army Air Forces Pilot Badge
Silver Star
Distinguished Flying Cross with 3 bronze oak leaf clusters	Purple Heart	Air Medal with 1 silver leaf cluster
American Campaign Medal	Asiatic-Pacific Campaign Medal with 3 bronze campaign stars	World War II Victory Medal

Army Presidential Unit Citation
