= EL/M-2090 =

Israeli long range BMD radar

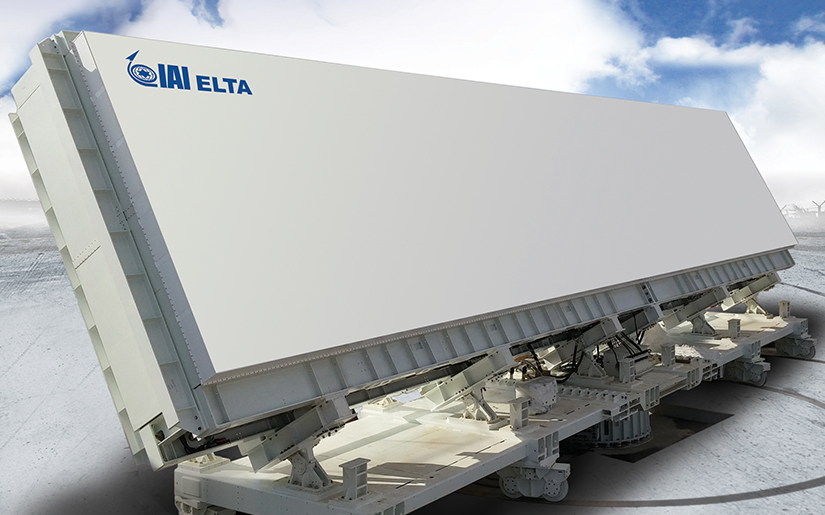
- Country of origin: Israel
- Introduced: 2015
- Type: Transportable multimode solid state active phased array radar.
- Frequency: UHF (ULTRA) and S band (SPECTRA)
- Power: Classified

The EL/M-2090 TERRA is an Israeli ground-based very long range early-warning radar system produced by Elta Systems, a subsidiary of Israel Aerospace Industries IAI. It is composed of two radars: the UHF Ultra and the S band SPECTRA. TERRA's performance is achieved through automatic handover and redundancy between the ULTRA and SPECTRA radars, combined with improved target load sharing, Electronic counter-countermeasures (ECCM) and severe-weather resilience. The system can be used for ballistic missiles and space objects detection and tracking at very long ranges.

Both Spectra and Ultra are active electronically scanned array (AESA) radars that are made up of thousands of transmit/receive modules and use gallium nitride technology (GaN) to enhance their efficiency.

== See also ==
- EL/M-2080 Green Pine
- AN/TPY-2
- Science and technology in Israel
