= ESR-32B =

ESR-32B is an Egyptian bi-dimensional L band for air and sea surveillance and early-warning radar. It was unveiled in EDEX 2018 by Benha Electronic Industries Company.

== Specifications ==
- Max. detection range: 250 km with 90% detection probability of a target with a radar cross-section of 1 m2
- Altitude: up to 12 km (flying at low and medium altitudes)
- Frequency: L band (similar to ESR-32A)
- Low side lobe antenna
- High system availability
- Easy installation
- ECCM
- Superior MTI performance
- Dual frequency transmitted pulse
- Low noise solid state RF amplifier
- Interference rejection
- Key features: In the ESR-32A, the antenna was a one-piece element installed above the cabinet, which required a long time to install and operate, with the need for external support. In the new configuration, the ESR-32B is mounted on a three-axle trailer which hosts the cabinet from front to back, which includes all the electronics as well as the control unit, followed by the area where the antenna is folded when in transmission mode. Once the radar is in deployment position, hydraulic jacks on the platform first allow the antenna to be moved upward while keeping it horizontal as it is during transport. It is then rotated forward towards the front of the vehicle in order to place it in the upright position, thanks to a mechanism that includes a winch on top of the cabinet and a folding frame. At this point, the antenna is fully deployed, in the transport configuration the two side elements of the antenna are folded over the central part, and the height of the bucket ensures that the cabinet does not interfere with the bottom of the antenna and is therefore free to rotate.
- The antenna works with planar array antenna technology, it exploites software-defined radio wave generation; digital receivers and digital signal processing with high enhancement factor increase radar performance.
- The emitted beam, average transmitted power: 800W
- Horizontal width of the beam: 2.4°
- Vertical width of the beam: 40°
- Resolution: in range is of 150 meters while that in azimuth is of 2.4°
- Range accuracy: ±75 meters while that in azimuth is of 1

== Operators ==
- Egypt: The Egyptian Air Force plans to use it as a gap filler in areas where the coverage provided by long-range fixed radars may be insufficient in a stressed situation; the sensor can be easily linked to a battalion-level command post, also operating in autonomous mode, or providing signals to higher-level air defense decision centers, when operating in networked mode.
