= 4734th Air Defense Group =

Discontinued United States Air Force organization

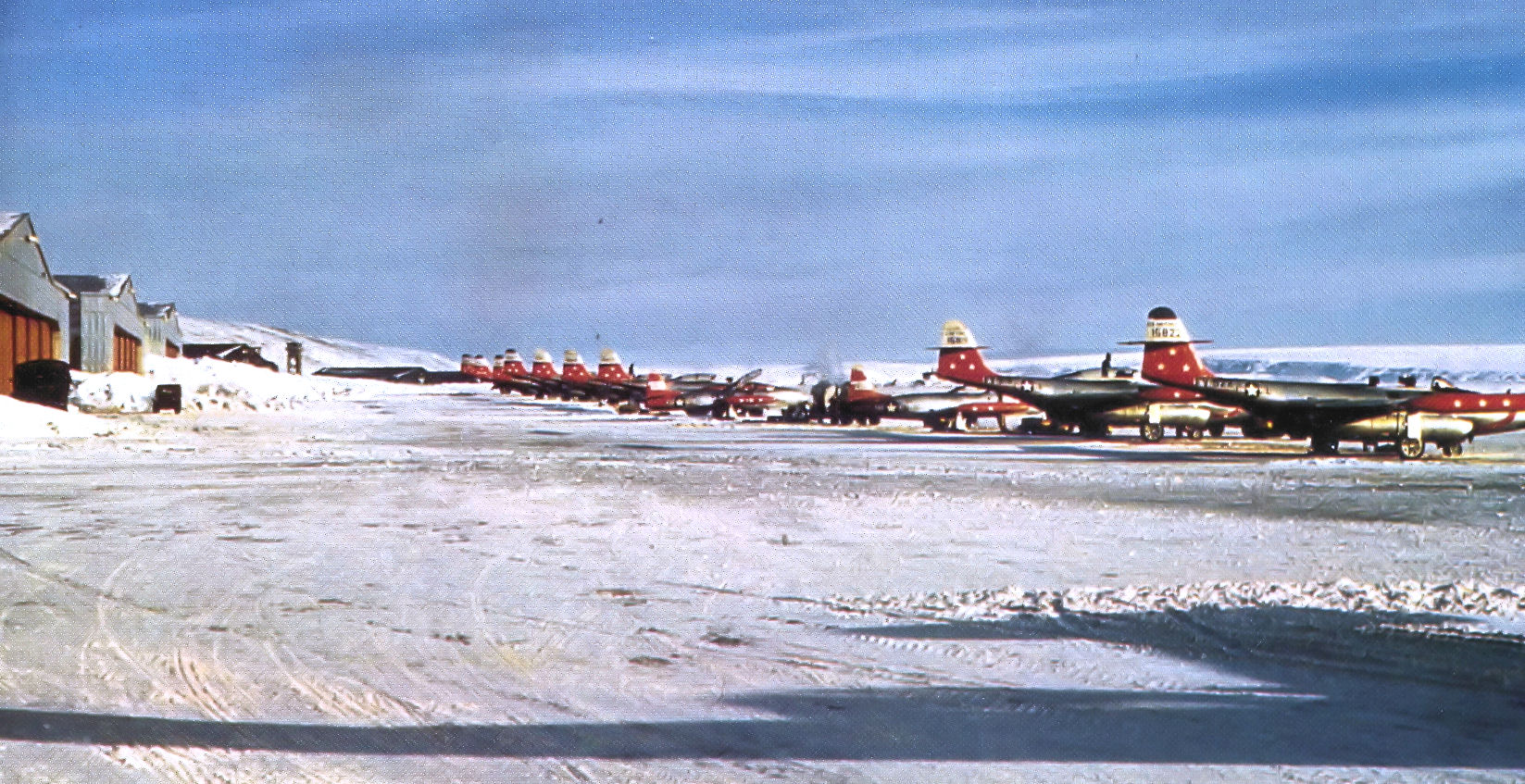
- F-89 Scorpions of the 74th Fighter-Interceptor Squadron at Thule
- Active: 1957–1958
- Country: United States
- Branch: United States Air Force
- Type: Fighter Interceptor, Warning & Control
- Role: Air defense

The 4734th Air Defense Group is a discontinued United States Air Force organization. It was assigned to the 64th Air Division at Thule Air Base, Greenland, where it was discontinued in 1958. The group was formed in 1957 when ADC assumed responsibility for air defense of Greenland from Northeast Air Command. It controlled a fighter-interceptor squadron at Thule and a squadron operating a radar at nearby Pingarsuak Mountain. It was discontinued in 1958 and its mission transferred to the 64th AD in Newfoundland.

== History ==
The group was organized in 1957 at Thule Air Base by Air Defense Command (ADC) when ADC took over the air defense assets of the inactivating Northeast Air Command (NEAC) at the base in 1957. It was assigned to the 64th Air Division to manage ADC fighter and radar units at Thule. Its squadrons had both been assigned to the 64th when the division was a NEAC unit. Its 74th Fighter-Interceptor Squadron flew Northrop F-89 Scorpion aircraft. The group was a tenant organization at Thule, a Strategic Air Command base, whose 4083d Air Base Group was the host organization for the base. The 4734th was discontinued in 1958, and its units were assumed directly by the 64th Division, with the establishment of Detachment 1, 64th AD at Thule.

== Lineage ==
- Organized as 4734th Air Defense Group on 1 April 1957

Discontinued on 1 May 1958

=== Assignments ===
- 64th Air Division, 1 April 1957 – 1 May 1958

=== Components ===
- 74th Fighter-Interceptor Squadron, 1 April 1957 – 1 May 1958
- 931st Aircraft Control and Warning Squadron, 1 April 1957 – 1 May 1958 (Note: Stationed at Thule, but operated from Pingarsuak Mountain.)

=== Stations ===
- Thule Air Base, Greenland, 1 April 1957 – 1 May 1958

=== Aircraft ===
- Northrop F-89C Scorpion, 1957–1958

=== Commander ===
- Col James T. Jarman, 1 April 1957 – 1 May 1958

== See also ==
- United States general surveillance radar stations
- List of United States Air Force Aerospace Defense Command Interceptor Squadrons
- List of United States Air Force aircraft control and warning squadrons
