= 74th Fighter Squadron =

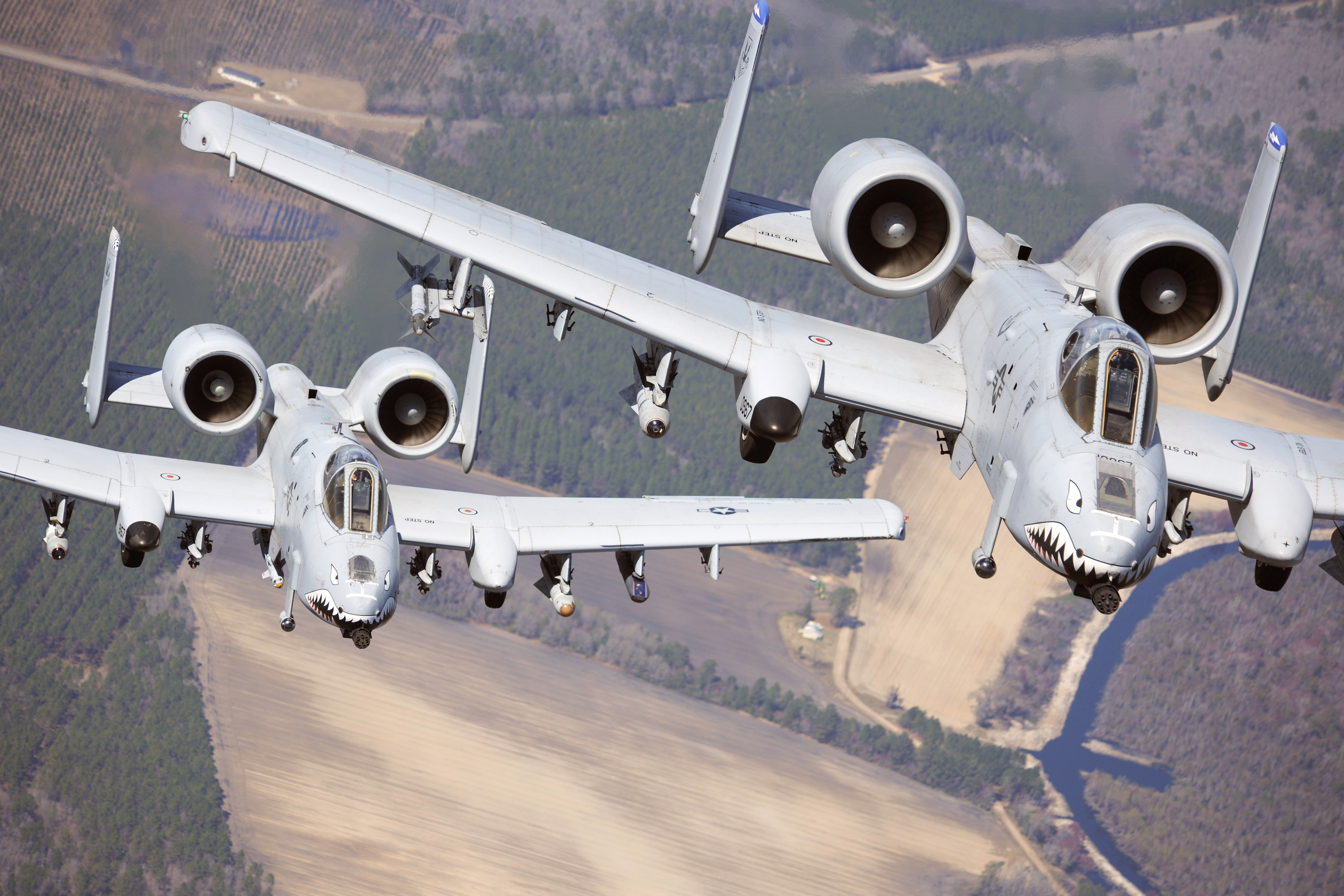
- A-10Cs of the 74th Fighter Squadron
- Active: 1942–1946; 1946–1949; 1951–1958; 1972–1992; 1993-present
- Country: United States
- Branch: United States Air Force
- Role: Fighter
- Part of: Air Combat Command; 15th Air Force; 23d Wing; 23d Fighter Group
- Garrison/HQ: Moody Air Force Base
- Nickname: Flying Tigers
- Motto: Thunder!
- Engagements: Asia-Pacific Theater World War II Vietnam War 1991 Gulf War Afghanistan Campaign Operation Inherent Resolve

- Decorations: Distinguished Unit Citation; Gallant Unit Citation; Air Force Outstanding Unit Award (9x); Republic of Vietnam Gallantry Cross with Palm

Commanders
- Current commander: Lt Col David Pool
- Notable commanders: Maj Frank Schiel Jr Maj John C. Herbst

Insignia
- 74th Fighter Squadron emblem (Note: Approved 4 May 1979.)

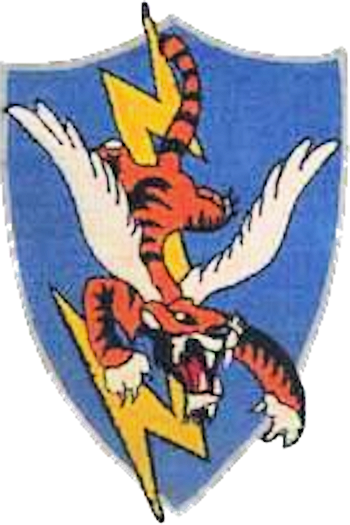
- 74th Fighter-Interceptor Squadron emblem (Note: Approved 24 September 1952. Description: .)

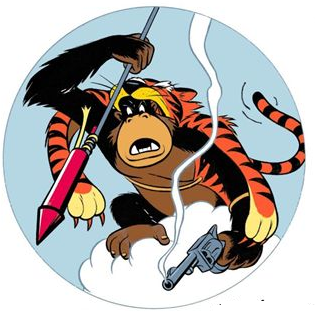
- 74th Fighter Squadron emblem (World War II)

The 74th Fighter Squadron is a United States Air Force unit. It is assigned to the 23rd Fighter Group and stationed at Moody Air Force Base, Georgia. The squadron is equipped with the Fairchild Republic A-10C Thunderbolt II ground attack aircraft.

During World War II, the 74th Fighter Squadron was one of the three original squadrons (74th, 75th, 76th) of the 23d Fighter Group.

On 17 December 1941, the AVG 1st Fighter Squadron was redesignated as the 23d Pursuit Group 74th Pursuit Squadron and subsequently the 74th Fighter Squadron.

== History ==
=== World War II ===
The 23d was the United States Army Air Forces China Air Task Force organization took over the operations of the 1st American Volunteer Group (AVG) of the Chinese Air Force when the AVG was disbanded. Some members of the AVG joined or rejoined the United States Air Force. Some volunteered to serve for an extra short period to help with the change-over.

The 74th was one of the original squadrons in the 23d to see combat action in the Far East. The Fighter Group used P-40 Warhawks, and later P-51 Mustangs, to cover a large operational area and diverse combat roles. The area of operation extended beyond China into Burma, French Indochina (Vietnam), and Formosa.

The mission taskings included counter air campaigns, strafing and bombing Japanese forces and installations, escorting bombers, flying reconnaissance missions, and intercepting Japanese bombers. The fighter group excelled in these roles and received the Distinguished Unit Citation for its exceptional performance during the war.

=== United States Air Force ===
Following World War II, the 74th was activated at various times and locations throughout the world. From 1946-1949 the 74th flew the P-47 at Northwest Field, Guam. During the years of 1951-1954, the 74th flew the F-86 and F-94 at Presque Isle AFB, Maine. The 74th then moved to Thule AB, Greenland, from 1954–1958 and flew the F-89. During the period 1958-1972, the 74th was inactive.

In July 1972, the 74th rejoined its sister squadrons for the first time since 1949 when the 23d Tactical Fighter Wing was activated at England Air Force Base LA. The 74th began operations flying the A-7 Corsair II in 1972 and transitioned into the A-10 "Thunderbolt II" in the summer of 1981.

During the 1980s, the 74th received the Air Force Outstanding Unit Award five different times. The most recent combat tasking for the 74th was during Operations DESERT SHIELD/STORM. From September 1990 until 11 April 1991, the 74th earned high praise for its performance during the campaign against Iraq's elusive Scud-B mobile missile launchers.

On 15 February 1992, the 74th was again inactivated at England Air Force Base as part of the Air Force's force structure realignment. It was activated 15 June 1993 at Pope AFB NC as part of the 23d Wing, the second composite wing built from the ground up. The 74th began operations at Pope AFB flying the F-16C/D Fighting Falcon. In July 1996, the F-16s departed Pope AFB and the 74th Fighter Squadron transitioned back to the A-10 aircraft.

The unit completed a deployment to Afghanistan in 2011.

Defense.gov reported in January 2018 that the 74th deployed personnel and equipment to form the 74th Expeditionary Fighter Squadron. The expeditionary squadron took part in Operation Inherent Resolve. The squadron focused it efforts in Raqqa for about three months, providing close air support to friendly forces fighting ISIL in the city. On 14 March 2019, the 74th Expeditionary Fighter Squadron was awarded the Gallant Unit Citation for this operation. According to the citation, squadron pilots faced persistent surface-to-air threats and repeated intercepts by Russian aircraft while developing "new tactics to strike enemy fighters fortified in deep enemy terrain while protecting civilians and coalition forces" from July 2017 to January 2018, while operating from Incirlik Air Base, Turkey. As the major force provider for the expeditionary squadron, this honor is bestowed on the 74th. It is only the fifth award of the citation and the first to an individual squadron.

On 18 October 2018, the squadron won the prestigious Hawgsmoke 2018 competition by being named Top Overall Team. The 74th were also awarded Top Tactical and Top Conventional team awards. The biennial A-10 bombing, missile and tactical gunnery competition was held at Whiteman Air Force Base, Missouri.

== Lineage ==
- Constituted as the 74th Pursuit Squadron (Interceptor) on 17 December 1941

Redesignated 74th Fighter Squadron on 15 May 1942
Activated on 4 Jul 1942
Redesignated 74th Fighter Squadron, Single Engine on 28 February 1944
Inactivated on 5 January 1946

- Activated on 10 October 1946

Inactivated on 24 September 1949

- Redesignated 74th Fighter-Interceptor Squadron on 19 December 1950

Activated on 12 January 1951
Inactivated on 25 June 1958

- Redesignated 74th Tactical Fighter Squadron on 18 May 1972

Activated on 1 July 1972
Redesignated 74th Fighter Squadron on 1 November 1991
Inactivated on 15 February 1992

- Activated on 15 June 1993

=== Assignments ===
- 23d Fighter Group, 4 July 1942 – 5 January 1946
- 23d Fighter Group, 10 October 1946 – 24 September 1949 (attached to 46th Fighter Wing December 1947 - 16 August 1948)
- 23d Fighter-Interceptor Group, 12 January 1951
- 4711th Defense Wing, 6 February 1952
- 528th Air Defense Group, 16 February 1953
- 64th Air Division, 21 August 1954
- 4734th Air Defense Group, 1 April 1957
- 64th Air Division, 1 May – 25 June 1958
- 23d Tactical Fighter Wing (later 23d Fighter Wing), 1 July 1972 – 15 February 1992 (attached to 354th Tactical Fighter Wing 2 July – 28 December 1973, Tactical Fighter Wing, 23, Provisional, 20 December 1990 – 20 April 1991)
- 23d Operations Group (later 23d Fighter Group), 15 June 1993 – present

=== Stations ===
- Kunming, China, 4 July 1942
- Yunnan, China, 12 March 1943
- Guilin, China, 19 May 1943 (detachment at Liuchow, China 16 February – 30 April 1944)
- Luliang Air Base, China, 12 September 1944 (detachment at Tushan, China March - August 1945)
- Liuzhou, China, c. Aug 1945
- Hangzhou Airfield, China, c. 15 October – 4 December 1945
- Fort Lewis, Washington, 3 – 5 January 1946
- Northwest Field (later Northwest Guam Air Force Base), Guam, 10 October 1946 – 3 April 1949
- Howard Air Force Base, Panama Canal Zone, 25 April – 24 September 1949
- Presque Isle Air Force Base, Maine, 12 January 1951 – 19 August 1954
- Thule Air Base, Greenland, 20 August 1954 – 25 June 1958
- England Air Force Base, Louisiana, 1 July 1972 – 15 February 1992 (deployed to Korat Royal Thai Air Force Base, Thailand, 2 July – 28 December 1973, King Fahd Airport, Saudi Arabia 29 August 1990 – 20 April 1991)
- Pope Air Force Base, North Carolina, 15 June 1993 – October 2006
- Moody Air Force Base, Georgia, October 2006 – present

=== Aircraft ===
- Curtiss P-40 Warhawk (1942–1944)
- North American P-51 Mustang (1944–1945)
- P-47 Thunderbolt (1946–1949)
- Lockheed RF-80 Shooting Star (1949)
- North American F-86E Sabre (1951)
- North American F-86A Sabre (1951–1952)
- Northrop F-89C Scorpion (1952, 1953–1958)
- Lockheed F-94B Starfire (1952–1953)
- LTV A-7D Corsair II (1972–1981)
- General Dynamics F-16C Fighting Falcon (1993–1996)
- General Dynamics F-16D Fighting Falcon (1993–1996)
- Fairchild Republic A-10 Thunderbolt II (1980–1992, 1996–present)
- Lockheed Martin F-35A Lighting II, 2029–
