= Thule Air Station =

American radar station in Greenland (1951–1965)

Site information
- Type: Air Force Station

Location
- Coordinates: 76°24′14″N 068°43′06″W

Site history
- Built: 1951
- In use: 1951-1965

Location of Thule Air Station, Greenland

Thule Air Station (ADC ID: G-32) is a closed United States Air Force General Surveillance Radar station. It is located 9.2 miles (14.8 km) south of Thule Air Base, Greenland. It was closed in 1965.

== History ==
Thule Air Station was constructed as a Ground-Control Intercept (GCI) radar site at the World War II Bluie West-6 weather station in 1950 by Northeast Air Command (NEAC), in conjunction with the larger Thule Air Base, 9 miles to the north 76°31′52″N 068°42′12″W. Its mission was to detect intrusion of unknown aircraft and relay that information to the interceptor squadron at Thule Air Base. The 931st Aircraft Control and Warning Squadron was assigned on 1 July 1952 by NEAC, and the station was declared operationally ready on 8 November 1952, the station (G-32) was equipped with AN/FPS-3, AN/FPS-4, AN/FPS-20A and AN/FPS-6 radars.

To broaden its range, two additional staffed sites were established. Etah Air Station (G-33, AKA "A-site") 78°18′50″N 072°36′35″W 144.5 miles (232.6 km) north-northwest, hosted Detachment 1, 921st AC&W Squadron, equipped with two AN/TPS-1D radars. Ice Cap Air Station (G-34, AKA "B-site"), 79°27′52″N 059°09′01″W 252.3 miles (406.0 km) north-northeast, hosted detachment 2, and was also equipped with two AN/TPS-1Ds.

The main station was logistically supported by Thule Air Base, and personnel assigned to the Radar Station would transport to and from the base, weather permitting. Duty at the station consisted of an "A" and a "B" shift of twelve hours each day, seven days a week. Personnel at the remote sites lived under the snow in metal structures connected by unheated hallways of steel corrugated tubes. When they did go outside it was through hatches in the ceilings to access auxiliary structures and the radar antennas. The locations of the stations, all north of the Arctic Circle, meant long periods without sunlight all day or with sunlight all day. The remote sites were supported by C-47 Skytrains equipped with skis, which would land on the hard-packed snow near the stations, providing logistical support and personnel transportation to and from Thule AB. Each remote site had a personnel complement of 20.

Although the Air Force provided as much in terms of recreation facilities at the remote sites as was possible, the fact was that in the 1950s, the duty there was extremely isolated and hard on the airmen stationed there. Det 1 and Det 2 were closed in April 1957 when Air Defense Command took over the stations and inactivated the "A" and "B" sites.

The radar site closed on 24 December 1965, and was replaced by the 12th Missile Warning Squadron, with radars designed to monitor ICBM launches rather than aircraft coming over from the Soviet Union. The main station at Thule was torn down in 1985. The remote sites were abandoned and left to the Arctic elements.

== Air Force units and assignments ==
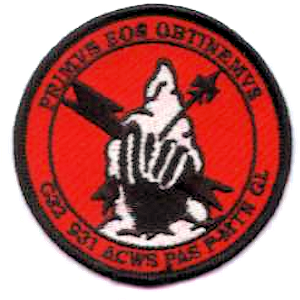
Emblem of the 931st Aircraft Control and Warning Squadron

Units:

- 931st Aircraft Control and Warning Squadron, Activated 1 July 1952 at Thule AB, Greenland

Assigned to Thule Air Station, 1 November 1952
Discontinued, 24 December 1965

Assignments:

- 64th Air Division (NEAC), 1 July 1952
- 4734th Air Defense Group (ADC), 1 April 1957
- 64th Air Division, 1 May 1958
- 4683d Air Defense Wing, 1 July 1960
- 4683d Air Base Group, 1 July 1965 – 24 December 1965

== See also ==
- List of USAF Aerospace Defense Command General Surveillance Radar Stations
- The Thing from Another World (Film)
