= Early-warning radar =

Form of radar system

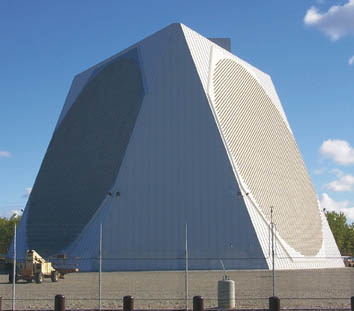
PAVE PAWS Early-warning radar, Alaska

An early-warning radar is any radar system used primarily for the long-range detection of its targets, i.e., allowing defences to be alerted as early as possible before the intruder reaches its target, giving the air defences the maximum time in which to operate. This contrasts with systems used primarily for tracking or gun laying, which tend to offer shorter ranges but offer much higher accuracy.

EW radars tend to share a number of design features that improve their performance in the role. For instance, EW radar typically operates at lower frequencies, and thus longer wavelengths, than other types. This greatly reduces their interaction with rain and snow in the air, and therefore improves their performance in the long-range role where their coverage area will often include precipitation. This also has the side-effect of lowering their optical resolution, but this is not important in this role. Likewise, EW radars often use much lower pulse repetition frequency to maximize their range, at the cost of signal strength, and offset this with long pulse widths, which increases the signal at the cost of lowering range resolution.

The canonical EW radar is the British Chain Home system, which entered full-time service in 1938. It used a very low pulse repetition of 25 pps and very powerful transmissions (for the era) reaching 1 MW in late-war upgrades. The German Freya and US CXAM (Navy) and SCR-270 (Army) were similar. Post-war models moved to the microwave range in ever-increasingly powerful models that reached the 50 MW range by the 1960s. Since then, improvements in receiver electronics has greatly reduced the amount of signal needed to produce an accurate image, and in modern examples the transmitted power is much less; the AN/FPS-117 offers 250 nautical miles (460 km; 290 mi) range from 25 kW. EW radars are also highly susceptible to radar jamming and often include advanced frequency hopping systems to reduce this problem.

== History ==
The first early-warning radars were the British Chain Home, the German Freya, the US CXAM (Navy) and SCR-270 (Army), and the Soviet Union RUS-2. By modern standards these were quite short range, typically about 100 to 150 miles (160 to 240 km). This "short" distance is a side effect of radio propagation at the long wavelengths being used at the time, which were generally limited to line-of-sight. Although techniques for long-range propagation were known and widely used for shortwave radio, the ability to process the complex return signal was simply not possible at the time.

=== Cold War ===
To counter the threat of Soviet bombers flying over the Arctic, the U.S. and Canada developed the DEW Line. Other examples (Pinetree Line) have since been built with even better performance. An alternative early warning design was the Mid-Canada Line, which provided "line breaking" indication across the middle of Canada, with no provision to identify the target's exact location or direction of travel. Starting in the 1950s, a number of over-the-horizon radars were developed that greatly extended detection ranges, generally by bouncing the signal off the ionosphere.

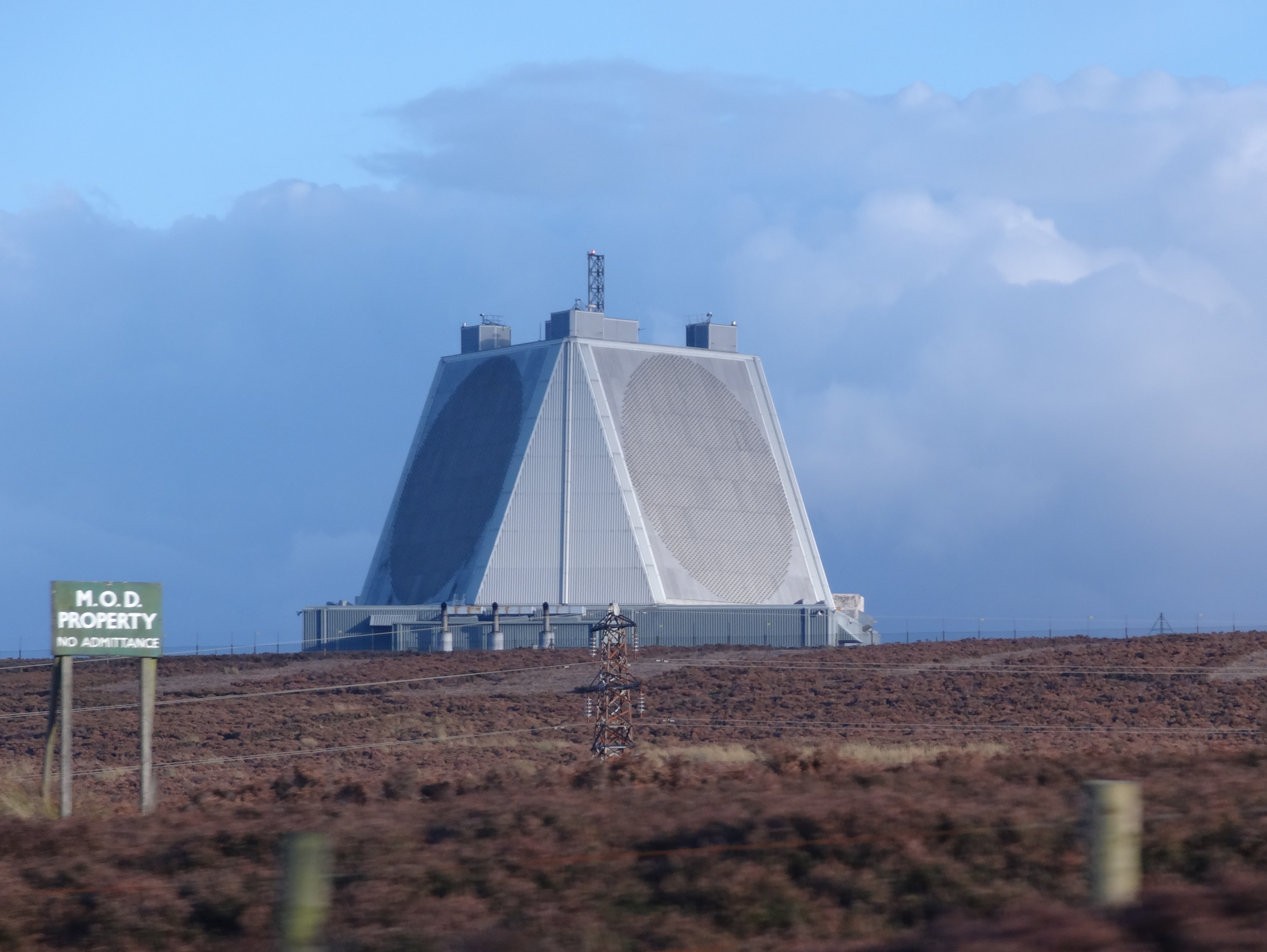
RAF Fylingdales, Pave Paws Ballistic Missile Early Warning System, North Yorkshire

=== Modern day ===
Today the early warning role has been supplanted to a large degree by airborne early warning platforms. By placing the radar on an aircraft, the line-of-sight to the horizon is greatly extended. This allows the radar to use high-frequency signals, offering high resolution, while still offering long range. A major exception to this rule are radars intended to warn of ballistic missile attacks, like BMEWS, as the high-altitude exo-atmospheric trajectory of these weapons allows them to be seen at great ranges even from ground-based radars.

== Early systems ==
- Chain Home
- Chain Home Low
- SCR-270
- AN/CPS-1
- CXAM radar
- Freya radar

== 1950s through 70s ==
- Pinetree Line
- Mid-Canada Line
- Distant Early Warning Line
- Duga radar
- BMEWS
- AMES Type 80
- AMES Type 84
- AMES Type 85
- ROTOR
- Dnestr radar
- Dnepr radar
- Daryal radar
- Linesman/Mediator

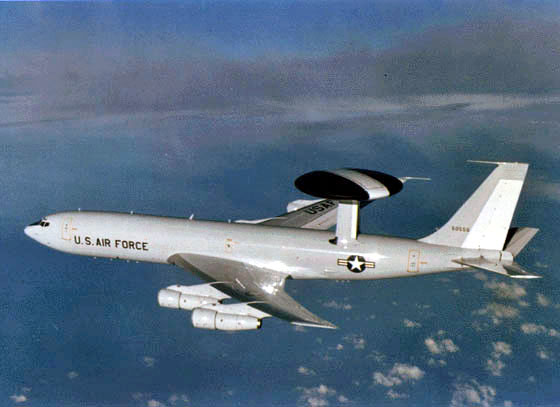
AWACS plane

== Operational systems ==
- AWACS, the US airborne system of surveillance radar plus command and control functions
- Daryal radar, Soviet and Russian early warning radar
- Dnestr radar, Soviet and Russian early warning radars
- Don-2N radar, Russian missile defence radar in Moscow
- Dunay radar, Soviet missile defence radar
- GIRAFFE, Swedish family of early warning radar systems
- EL/M-2080 Green Pine, Israeli ground-based missile-defense radar by Elta
- EL/M-2090, Israeli ground-based very long range early-warning radar system
- Erieye, Swedish airborne system of surveillance radar
- Jindalee, Australian over-the-horizon radar network
- Long Range Discrimination Radar, the US radar system
- North Warning System, a joint United States and Canadian early-warning radar system
- NETRA, Indian airborne early warning and control aircraft
- PAVE PAWS, the US early warning radar
- RAF Fylingdales, British early warning radar
- Red Color, Israeli early warning radar system
- Sea-based X-band Radar, the US sea-based early-warning radar station
- Voronezh radar, Russian early warning radar system
- ESR-32A, Egyptian air surveillance and early-warning radar system
- ASELSAN ALP-300G

== See also ==
- Radar picket
