= ESR-32A =

ESR-32A is an Egyptian two-dimensional L band aerial scanning and early-warning radar. It was unveiled during EDEX 2018.

== Specifications ==
- Detection range: up to 250 kilometers
- Altitude: up to 12 km (detects targets flying at low and medium altitudes)
- analyzes and evaluates air risks and threats and determines the types of air defense systems needed to deal with them.
- Civil variant: monitor and direct air traffic.
- Manufacturer: 100% locally made by the research centers of the Egyptian Armed Forces, the Egyptian National Authority for Military Production (Benha Electronis), and the Air Defense Missile Command Center.
- Components: an antenna transmission unit, a transmitter, and a separate receiving unit in a special cabin, and a screen to display the data.
- Frequency: L band.

The radar is in service, and after its practical success, the armed forces developed three-dimensional radars with phased arrays with a range of 450 kilometers, and it was announced in the second edition of the exhibition in 2021.

== Operators ==
- Egypt: in service with the Egyptian Air Defense Forces.

== See also ==
- ESR-32B
