= 12th Space Warning Squadron =

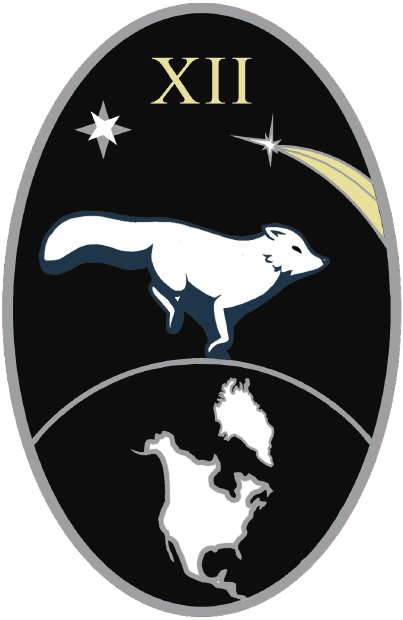
- Squadron emblem
- Active: 1967 – present
- Country: United States
- Branch: United States Space Force
- Role: Missile Detection and Warning
- Part of: Space Delta 4
- Headquarters: Pituffik Space Base, Greenland
- Motto: Top of the World
- Decorations: Air Force Outstanding Unit Award

Commanders
- Current commander: Lt Col Barry Knoblock

Insignia
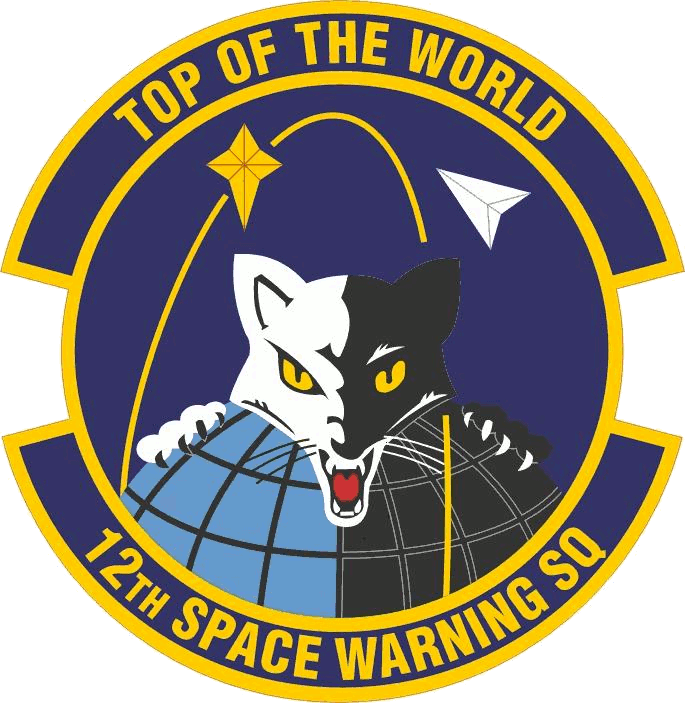
- Former 12th Missile Warning Squadron emblem

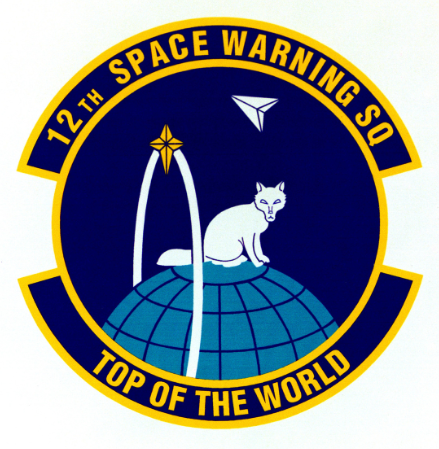
- Former 12th Missile Warning Squadron emblem, c. 1994

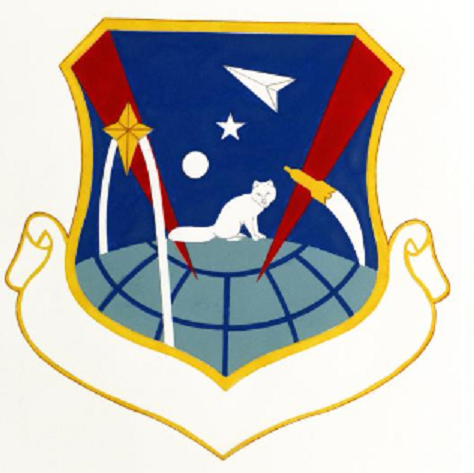
- 12th Missile Warning Group emblem

The 12th Space Warning Squadron is a United States Space Force ground-based radar used for missile warning, missile defense, and space situation awareness, stationed at Pituffik Space Base, Greenland.

== Overview ==
The primary mission of the 12th SWS is to provide critical, real-time missile warning, defense, and space surveillance to the President of the United States, Secretary of Defense, the Joint Chiefs of Staff, NORAD, and unified commands by operating a phased-array radar—which continuously provides warning of submarine-launched ballistic missile (SLBM) and intercontinental ballistic missile attacks against North America—and detect, track, and identify earth-orbiting objects in support of USSTRATCOM's space control mission, thus "knitting a blanket of freedom".

The 12th Space Warning Squadron is a unit of the Space Delta 4 which is under Air Force Space Command.

To accomplish its mission, the squadron operates the solid-state phased-array radar located at the Ballistic Missile Early Warning System (BMEWS), Site I. The BMEWS site is located approximately 11 miles northwest of Pituffik SB 76.569°N 68.318°W. It provides early warning detection of intercontinental ballistic missile (ICBM) launches from the Russian land mass and submarine-launched ballistic missile (SLBM) launches from the North Atlantic and Arctic Oceans against North America. Additionally, BMEWS keeps track of polar orbiting satellites. The operational crews report through the Missile Warning Center to the NORAD/USNORTHCOM Center.

The Operation Support Flight (DOO) provides direct operational support to the missile warning crews. The flight's Operations Training Section (DOT) provides all crew force initial, recurring, and supplemental training. Other flight responsibilities include hardware, software and maintenance support (MA), operational test and evaluation (DOV), and crew force management (DOU).

== History ==
The 12th SWS was formed in January 1967 as a successor organization to the Air Defense Command 931st Aircraft Control and Warning Squadron, which was inactivated at the end of 1965. The 931st AC&WS operated a series of Ground-Control Intercept (GCI) radar sites in Greenland to detect intrusion of unknown aircraft. The squadron relayed information to the 64th NORAD Region Semi Automatic Ground Environment (SAGE) system DC-31 Direction Center, and interceptor squadrons stationed at Thule Air Base.

With the development of ICBM and SLBM technologies, the mission to monitor aircraft coming over the horizon from the Soviet Union was transferred to other units, and the 931st AC&WS at Thule AB was inactivated.

== Lineage ==
- Constituted as the 12th Missile Warning Squadron on 1 November 1966

Activated on 1 January 1967
Redesignated 12th Missile Warning Group on 31 March 1977
Redesignated 12th Missile Warning Squadron on 15 June 1983
Redesignated 12th Missile Warning Group on 1 October 1989
Redesignated 12th Space Warning Squadron on 15 May 1992

=== Assignments ===
- 71st Missile Warning Wing, 1 January 1967
- Fourteenth Aerospace Force, 30 April 1971
- 21st Air Division, 1 October 1976
- Aerospace Defense Command, 1 October 1979
- 40th Air Division, 1 December 1979
- 1st Space Wing, 1 May 1993
- 21st Operations Group, 15 May 1992
- 21st Space Wing, 1 June 1995
- 21st Operations Group, 1 August 1999
- Space Delta 4, 24 July 2020 – Present

== Bases stationed ==
- Pituffik Space Base, Greenland, 1 January 1967 – present

== Equipment operated ==
Ballistic Missile Early Warning System (BMEWS)

== List of commanders ==
Start	End	Commander
June 2002	June 2003	Lt Col Shawn Barnes
June 2003	June 2004	Lt Col Thomas Doyne
June 2004	June 2005	Lt Col Franklin "Joey" Hinson Jr
June 2005	June 2006	Lt Col Scott Peel
June 2006	June 2007	Lt Col Timothy Lincoln
June 2007	June 2008	Lt Col James Forand
June 2008	26 June 2009	Lt Col David O. Meteyer
26 June 2009	February 2010	Lt Col James Oldenburg
February 2010	3 June 2010	Lt Col Kimberly Damalas (appointed)
3 June 2010	16 June 2011	Lt Col Jeffrey Van Sanford
16 June 2011	21 June 2012	Lt Col Christopher S. Putman
21 June 2012	11 July 2013	Lt Col Gregory G. Karahalis
11 July 2013	June 2014	Lt Col Kelly S. Easler
June 2014	June 2015	Lt Col Jason Resley
June 2015	June 2016	Lt Col Marc A. Brock
June 2016	June 2017	Lt Col David L. Ransom
8 June 2017	June 2018	Lt Col Carl B. Bottolfson
7 June 2018	June 2019	Lt Col Neil A. Menzie
~June 2019	24 June 2020	Lt Col Jared Smith
24 June 2020	~June 2021	Lt Col Brandon Alford
June 2021	June 2022	Lt Col Christopher R. Hill
June 2022	June 2023	Lt Col April Foley
June 2023	June 2024	Lt Col Brian Moore
June 2024	June 2025	Lt Col Marcus Losinski
June 2025	Present	Lt Col Barry Knoblock
