= RAF Fylingdales =

Royal Air Force base in Yorkshire, England

RAF Fylingdales
- Near Whitby, North Yorkshire, in England
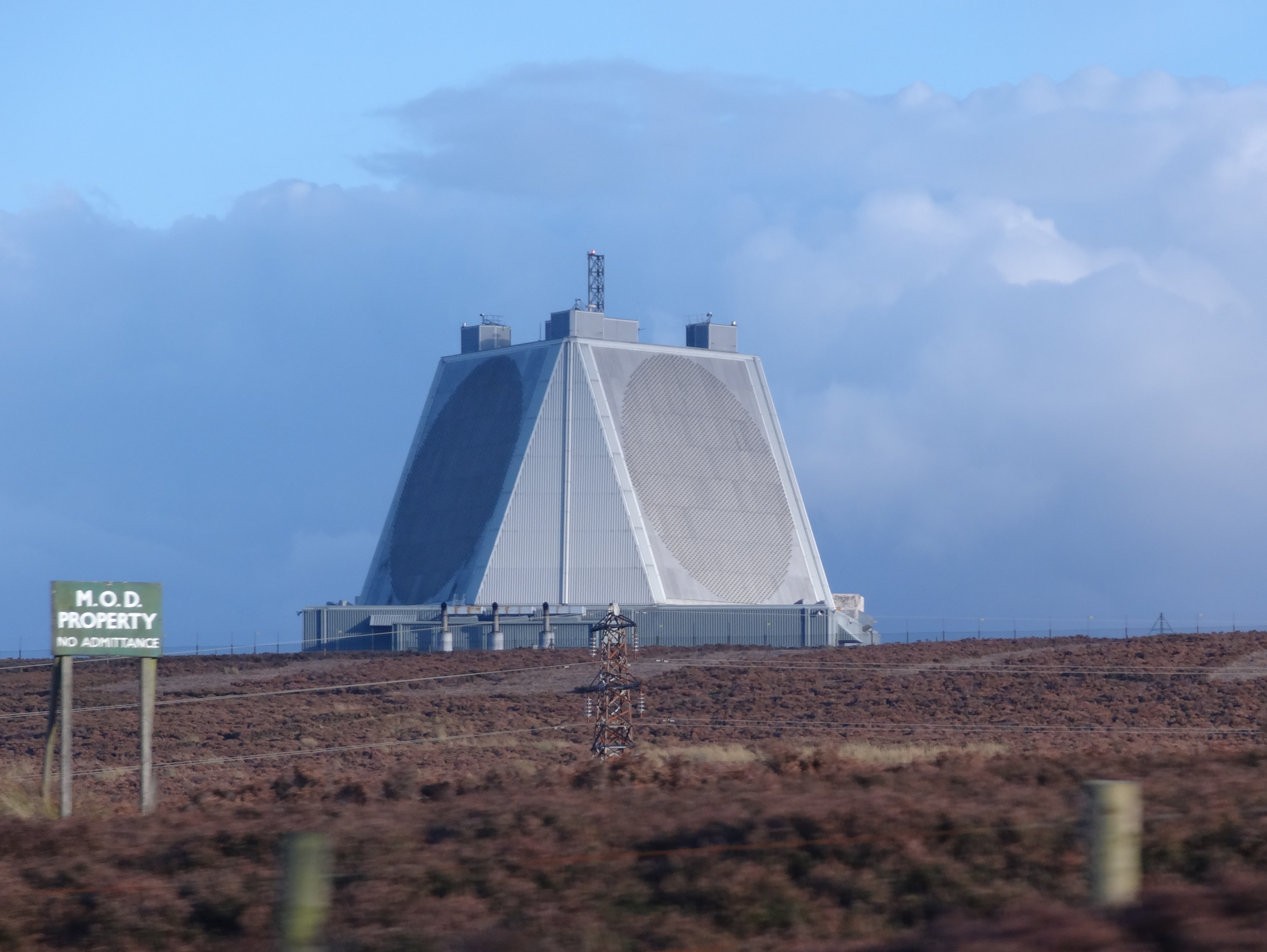
- AN/FPS-132 Solid State Phased Array Radar System at RAF Fylingdales

- Vigilamus (Latin for 'We are Watching')

Site information
- Type: Ballistic Missile Early Warning station
- Owner: Ministry of Defence
- Operator: Royal Air Force
- Controlled by: UK Space Command
- Open to the public: No
- Radar type: Raytheon AN/FPS-132 Solid State Phased Array Radar System (SSPARS)
- Website: Official website

Location
- Shown within North Yorkshire
- Coordinates: 54°21′32″N 000°40′11″W
- Height: 820 feet (250 m)

Site history
- Built: 1962/63
- In use: 1963–Present

Garrison information
- Current commander: Wg Cdr Toby Steward

PAVE PAWS and BMEWS coverage

Royal Air Force Fylingdales (RAF Fylingdales) is a Royal Air Force station on Snod Hill in the North York Moors, England. Its motto is Vigilamus ("We are watching"). It is a radar base, formerly part of the Ballistic Missile Early Warning System (BMEWS), and now part of the Solid State Phased Array Radar System (SSPARS).

As part of intelligence-sharing arrangements between the United States and United Kingdom (see, for example, the UKUSA Agreement), data collected at RAF Fylingdales are shared between the two countries. Its primary purpose is to give the British and US governments warning of an impending ballistic missile attack (part of the so-called four minute warning during the Cold War). A secondary role is the detection and tracking of orbiting objects; Fylingdales is part of the United States Space Surveillance Network.

As well as its early-warning and space-tracking roles, Fylingdales has a third function – the Satellite Warning Service for the UK. It keeps track of spy satellites used by other countries, so that secret activities in the UK can be carried out when they are not overhead. The armed services, defence manufacturers and research organisations, including universities, take advantage of this facility.

== History ==
=== Cold War ===
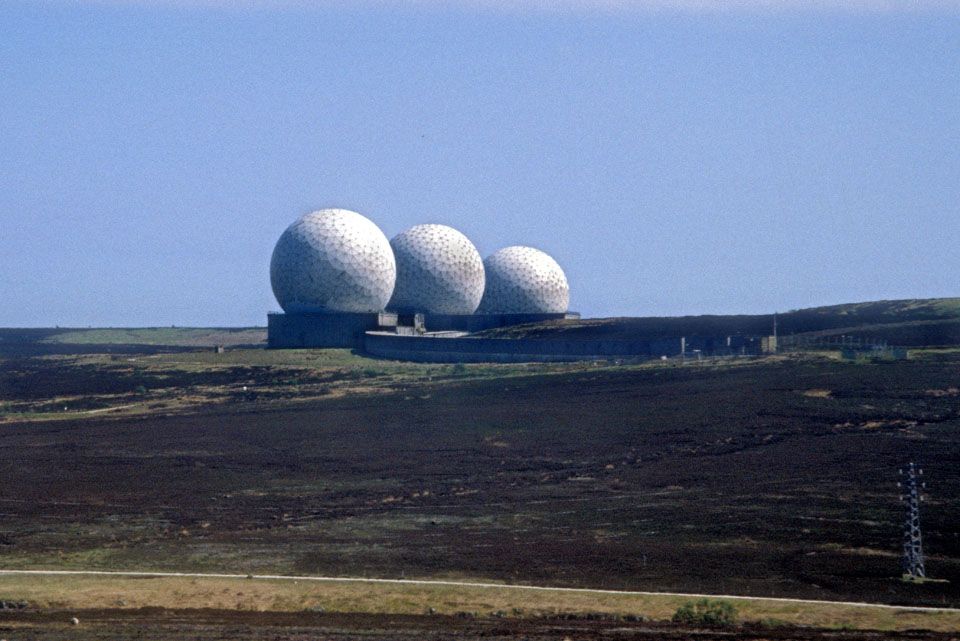
The radomes at Fylingdales in 1989

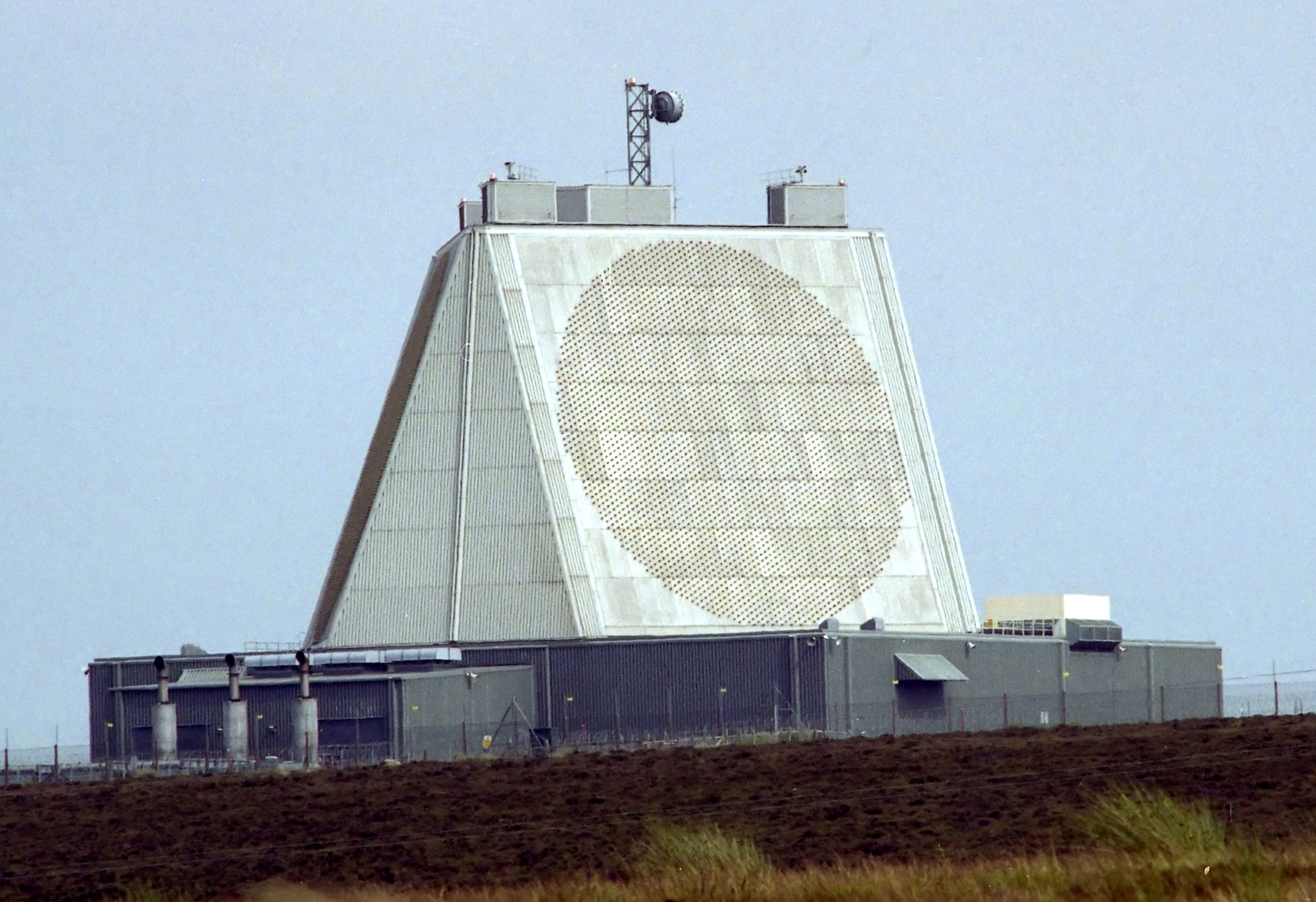
The Solid State Phased Array Radar (SSPAR)

The station was sited on a former wartime mortar range on Snod Hill, which had to be comprehensively cleared by RAF Bomb Disposal before building could begin. The station was built by the Radio Corporation of America (RCA) in 1962, and was maintained by RCA (Great Britain), now Serco Group plc. RAF Fylingdales consisted of three 130-foot (40 m) diameter 'golfballs' or geodesic domes (radomes) containing mechanically steered radar. Operation of the Fylingdales site transferred to RAF Fighter Command on 15 January 1964 although the site became operational on 17 September 1963. It became a local tourist attraction as a result.

Between 1989 and 13 November 1992, Raytheon, the US defence contractor, completed a contract that saw the domes replaced by the current tetrahedron ('pyramid') structure, originally housing the AN/FPS-126 AESA phased array radar system. The site is 820 feet (250 m) above sea level and the structure is nine floors high rising from its ground level to 120 feet (37 m) high.

The radar system was upgraded in 2007 by Boeing to the Raytheon AN/FPS-132 Upgraded Early Warning Radar (UEWR).

=== National Missile Defence ===
In the late 1990s, the United States decided to pursue a National Missile Defense plan fully, and RAF Fylingdales attracted further publicity. To improve tracking capabilities (for launches from Africa and the Middle East) the United States wanted the use of Fylingdales as part of its NMD network. After receiving a formal request from the US, the British Government agreed to its use as an NMD tracking facility. The decision was criticised, because the proposed NMD system was solely for US benefit.

According to the BBC, The Independent reported that the British Government secretly agreed to the US request to station NMD missile interceptors at Fylingdales Moor in late 2004. This has subsequently been denied by the Ministry of Defence. The £449 million upgrade for RAF Fylingdales to become an NMD tracking facility was undertaken by Boeing, with Raytheon as the major subcontractor.

== Operation ==
=== BMEWS ===
While the radar station remains a British asset operated and commanded by the Royal Air Force, it also forms one of three stations in the United States BMEWS network (the United States also funds the cost of the radar units). The other two stations in the network are Thule Air Base, Greenland and Clear Space Force Station, Alaska. The data obtained by Fylingdales is shared fully and freely with the United States, where it feeds into the US-Canadian North American Aerospace Defense Command at Peterson Space Force Base in Colorado Springs.

The British Government advised in March 2018, that as of the beginning of that month, fewer than five United States military personnel and ten US contractors worked at the station.

Space Delta 4 of the United States Space Force, maintains a liaison officer at Fylingdales to act as link to US missile warning operations and advises the RAF station commander on operational issues.

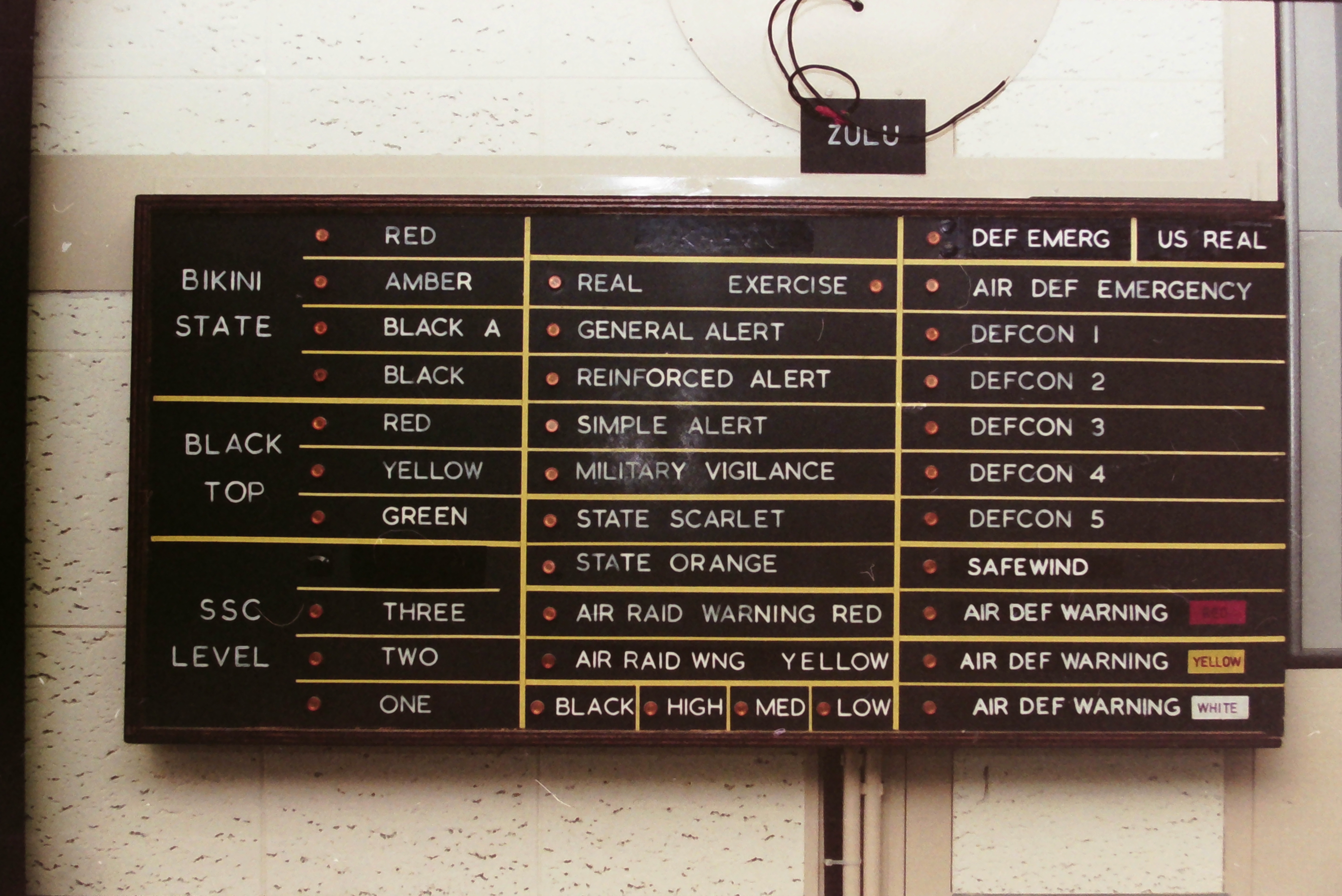
Levels of emergency warning alerts at RAF Fylingdales, 1987

The secondary role of detection and tracking of orbiting objects, also called Space Situational Awareness (SSA), as part of the United States Space Surveillance Network is carried out in conjunction with RAF High Wycombe.

=== Systems ===
The primary radars of RAF Fylingdales are active electronically scanned array (AESA) phased array radars, mounted on each face of a truncated tetrahedron, typically referred to as the "pyramid" or the Solid State Phased Array Radar System (SSPARS). This makes Fylingdales unique amongst its peers in that it covers a full 360 degrees. Each of the three arrays is 84 feet (26 m) across and contains around 2560 transmit/receive modules; mean power output is about 2.5 MW, with a tracking range of 3,000 nautical miles (5,600 km; 3,500 mi).

=== Protests by the Campaign for Nuclear Disarmament ===
The functions of RAF Fylingdales have been subject to criticism from opposition groups, such as the Campaign for Nuclear Disarmament (CND), leading to protests being held on occasion. These stem from concerns regarding the base's association with nuclear warfare and the militarisation of space. They argue against the UK assisting the US National Missile Defense (NMD) programme with RAF Fylingdales' ability to detect attacks, saying it is destabilising US and European relations with Russia, makes the UK the front line in any future conflict and it could be information from Fylingdales that initiates a nuclear response from the US and/or the UK to a perceived threat – real or false; intended or accidental.

=== Concerns over radiation levels ===
The radar beam has created serious concern of radiation risks due to leakage from the sides of the beam's "side lobes". Although the radiation levels are within UK limits (NRPB), it would be harder for the base to keep within the tighter European Union limits (INIRPB), which the UK may soon adopt, though Britain's exit from the EU makes this less likely.

=== 2019 bomb hoax ===
On 26 August 2019, Laura Woodwardsmith telephoned North Yorkshire Police and made a bomb threat in relation to RAF Fylingdales. Although, the Ministry of Defence Police locked down the base as a precaution, it was later revealed that Woodwardsmith was both drunk and having a mental breakdown when making the threat.

=== Guarding and security ===
The Northern Echo states that Fylingdales is guarded by 80 military policemen, however RAF Fylingdales is guarded by the Ministry of Defence Guard Service (approx 19 officers) and Ministry of Defence Police (approx 60–100 officers) neither of which operate under a military capacity. The station has a checkpoint by the A169 roadside and further checkpoints at each of its fences. The outer fence is an 8000 volt electrified fence and all entrance gates can be locked and razor wire placed in the opening on metal truss frames.

== Cultural references ==
- The monitoring function is referred to in the Jethro Tull song "Fylingdale Flyer" which appears on the album A and in the Slipstream video.
- In the 1983 film The Day After, the Fylingdales facility is referred to 'as some place in England' with response to the early detection of a nuclear strike by two radar facilities (the other being Beale Air Force Base, California, US).
- RAF Fylingdales can be seen in earlier episodes of the 1960s set ITV Drama Heartbeat, filmed in the village of Goathland just a few miles away.
- Turning Fylingdales Inside Out is a Newcastle University project to make RAF Fylingdale's history visible to the public for the first time

== See also ==
- List of Royal Air Force stations
- Space Situational Awareness Programme
- GRAVES – French space surveillance system
