= EL/M-2080 Green Pine =

Israeli ground-based missile-defense radar by Elta

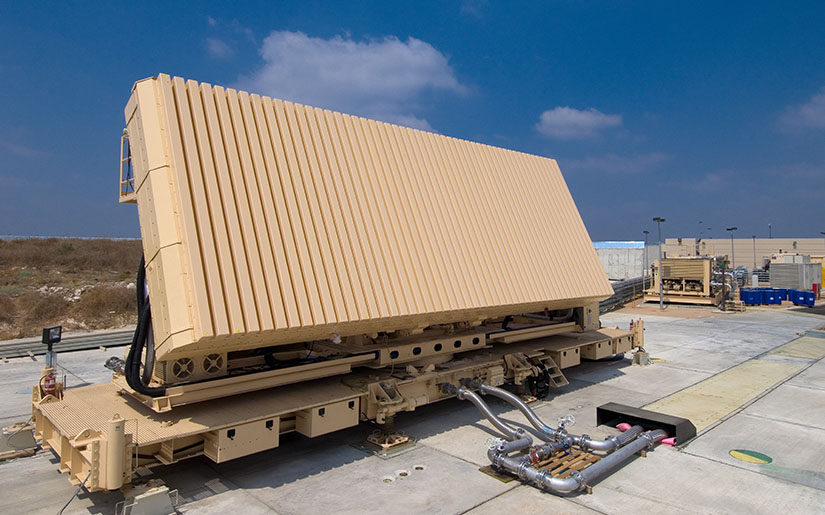
- EL/M-2080 Green Pine antenna
- Country of origin: Israel
- Introduced: 1995
- Type: Transportable multimode solid state active phased array radar.
- Frequency: UHF and L band 500 - 2,000 MHz
- Range: 500 km (310 mi) to 900 km (560 mi)
- Diameter: 9 m (30 ft) × 3 m (9.8 ft)
- Precision: ±4 meters (13 ft)
- Power: Classified, but could be used as a directed-energy device.
- Other names: Oren Yarok

The EL/M-2080 Green Pine (Hebrew: אורן ירוק, pronounced [oʁen jaʁok]) is an Israeli ground-based missile defense radar produced by Elta Systems, a subsidiary of Israel Aerospace Industries, to operate mainly with the Arrow theater missile defense system of Israel, which is jointly funded and produced with the United States. The system was exported to India, and its advanced version, the Green Pine Block-B, was delivered to South Korea at a cost of $83 million per unit, and to Azerbaijan. The Israeli Air Defense Command within the Israeli Air Force (IAF) of the Israel Defense Forces (IDF) operates both Green Pine radars and Green Pine Block-B radars as an integral part of the Arrow system.

== History ==
The Arrow program was launched as a response to the acquisition by Arab states of long range surface-to-surface missiles. The United States and Israel signed a memorandum of understanding to co-fund it in 1986, and in 1988 the United States Department of Defense Strategic Defense Initiative Organization (SDIO) placed an order with Israel Aircraft Industries for the Arrow 1 technology demonstrator. Over the years SDIO was renamed to Ballistic Missile Defense Organization (BMDO), and later to Missile Defense Agency (MDA), while Israel Aircraft Industries was renamed to Israel Aerospace Industries. The Gulf War, which exposed the controversial performance of the Patriot missile against Iraqi "Al Hussein" missiles, gave further impetus to the development of the Arrow. It was initially designed to intercept missiles such as the SS-1 "Scud", its "Al Hussein" derivative, the SS-21 "Scarab" operated by Syria, and the CSS-2 operated by Saudi Arabia. The Arrow evolved also with an eye on the advanced missile programs of Iran.

Elta was awarded the contract to develop and manufacture the EL/M-2080 Green Pine radar in 1992. The Green Pine was developed from the Elta Music phased array radar, presented in November 1994, rolled out in 1995, and turned operational in November 1998. The Green Pine has since been used in dozens of tests of the Arrow system. In 2000 it was revealed that the Green Pine detected the launch of a Syrian Scud-D missile from its base outside Aleppo in northern Syria, and tracked its full trajectory until its impact point, some 700 km (430 mi) in the southern desert. In 2005, and in 2008, Green Pine detected and tracked similar drills of Syrian Scuds.

On July 29, 2004, Israel and the United States carried out a joint test at the Naval Air Station Point Mugu (NAS Point Mugu) Missile Test Center in California, in which the Arrow interceptor was launched against a real Scud-B missile. The test represented a realistic scenario that could not have been tested in Israel due to test-field safety restrictions. To enable the test a full battery was shipped to Point Mugu. The Green Pine radar and command-and-control systems were deployed at the base, while the Arrow launcher was installed 100 km (62 mi) offshore on an island that forms part of the test range. The test was a success, with the interceptor destroying the Scud that flew a 300 km (190 mi) trajectory at an altitude of 40 km (25 mi), west of San Nicolas Island. This was the seventh test of the complete system, the first interception of a real Scud.

As of 2012 the Green Pine radar has a proven track record demonstrated in over 20 successful ballistic missile intercepts.

== Specifications ==
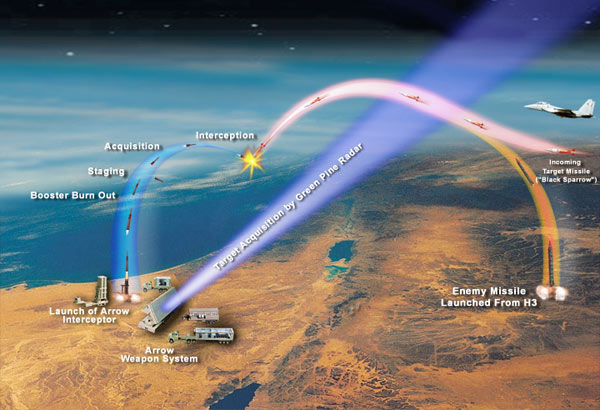
Stages of missile interception by the Arrow system, using Green Pine radar.

In contrast to the older AN/MPQ-53 Passive Electronically Scanned Array (PESA) radar set of the MIM-104 Patriot PAC-2, the Green Pine is an active electronically scanned array (AESA) solid state radar. Unlike the advanced AN/TPY-2 X band radar of the Terminal High Altitude Area Defense system, Green Pine operates at L band - in the 500 MHz to 2,000 MHz range.

Green Pine reportedly operates in search, detection, tracking, and missile guidance modes simultaneously, capable of detecting targets at ranges of up to about 500 km (310 mi), and is able to track more than 30 targets at speeds over 3,000 m/s (10,000 ft/s). It discriminates targets from natural clutter and countermeasures, illuminates the true target and guides the missile to within 4 m (13 ft) of the target.

The effective radiated power (ERP) of the Green Pine also makes it a possible candidate for conversion into a directed-energy weapon, by focusing pulses of radar energy on target missiles. The energy spikes are tailored to enter missiles through antennas or sensor apertures where they can fool guidance systems, scramble computer memories or even burn out sensitive electronic components.

The radar system includes a 9 m (30 ft) wide by 3 m (9.8 ft) high trailer-mounted rotatable antenna array, a power system, a cooling system and a radar control center. The power system has both no-break and transformer containers, with the former including a diesel generator, an inductive clutch control module and a diesel fuel tank. The transformer container houses transformers, a service generator, a power inverter and switching racks. The radar's cooling system is a heat exchanger that makes use of inherently redundant cascade cooling machines and incorporates an integral coolant tank and control panels. The radar is made up of 2,000–2,300 transmit–receive modules and weighs 60 tonnes (130,000 lb). The system is transportable rather than mobile, as it can be moved to other prepared sites, but cannot be set up just anywhere. According to its developer, Green Pine's deployment at a new operational site takes "less than 24 hours".

=== Green Pine Block-B ===
An advanced version of the radar, called EL/M-2080S Super Green Pine, Green Pine Block-B, or Great Pine (Hebrew: אורן אדיר, pronounced [oʁen adiʁ]), is to take the place of the original Green Pine. It is composed of more powerful but smaller transmit–receive modules with better capabilities than those of the Green Pine, and is believed to produce double the power output, extending detection range to about 800–900 km (500–560 mi). In October 2010 the IDF decided to put another Arrow 2 battery into operational use. The new battery received the new radar - Green Pine Block-B.

=== Green Pine Block-C ===
Green Pine Block-C has been revealed in November 2018.

== Users ==
Azerbaijan
According to Stockholm International Peace Research Institute report, an arms deal signed between Israel and Azerbaijan in 2011 considers import of one Green Pine radar.

Israel
Israel had deployed at least 2 Green Pine radars as an integral part of the Arrow system. As of 2008 an unknown number of both Green Pine and Green Pine Block-B versions were active. As of 2012, the first Green Pine Block-B was declared operational and is deployed alongside the two Green Pines.

India
India had acquired and deployed two Green Pine radars around July 2002 and another one in August 2005. The Swordfish Long Range Tracking Radar of the Indian Defence Research and Development Organisation is an acknowledged derivative of the original Green Pine. The Indian government has sought to purchase the complete Arrow system since 1999, but in early 2002 the U.S. vetoed Israel's request to sell the Arrow 2 missiles to India, exercising its right as a major funding contributor. U.S. officials argued that the sale would violate the Missile Technology Control Regime (MTCR).

South Korea
South Korea bought two Green Pine Block-B radars, which became operational in 2012. South Korea to procure two Green Pine Block-C radars, valued at about $292 million. Deliveries are scheduled for the early 2020s.

Germany
Germany has deployed the Super Green Pine radar on Schönewalde/Holzdorf Air Base as part of their Arrow III exoatmospheric missile defense shield.

== See also ==
- EL/M-2090
- AN/TPY-2
- Arrow missile
- Science and technology in Israel

== Bibliography ==
- Stav, Arieh (2004). The threat of ballistic missiles in the Middle East: active defense and countermeasures. Sussex Academic Press. ISBN 1-84519-001-7.
- Bar-Joseph, Uri (2001). Israel's national security towards the 21st Century. Frank Cass Publishers. ISBN 0-7146-5169-9.
- Naveh, Ben-Zion; Lorber, Azriel (2001). Theater ballistic missile defense. American Institute of Aeronautics and Astronautics. ISBN 1-56347-385-2.
