= List of unnumbered minor planets: 2002 T (320–619) =

This is a partial list of unnumbered minor planets for principal provisional designations assigned during 1–15 October 2002. Since this period yielded a high number of provisional discoveries, it is further split into several standalone pages. As of March 2026, a total of 187 bodies remain unnumbered for this period. Objects for this year are listed on the following pages: A–B · C · D–F · G–K · L–O · P · Q_{i} · Q_{ii} · R_{i} · R_{ii} · S · T_{i} · T_{ii} · U–V and W–Y. Also see previous and next year.

Near-Earth obj.	MBA (inner)	MBA (outer)	Centaur
Mars-crosser	MBA (middle)	Jupiter trojan	Trans-Neptunian obj.
Unclassified

== T ==
U	Designation	Class	Physical		Observations				Description and notes	Ref
U	Designation	Class	H	D	Opp.	Arc	Last	Used	Description and notes	Ref
0	2002 TL320	MBA-M	18.2	960 m	multiple	2002–2020	23 Nov 2020	54	Disc.: SDSS; Alt.: 2020 TQ18	MPC; JPL
0	2002 TM320	MBA-I	18.69	540 m	multiple	2002–2022	25 Jan 2022	37	Disc.: SDSS; Alt.: 2020 RZ43	MPC; JPL
0	2002 TU320	MBA-I	18.7	540 m	multiple	2002–2020	10 Sep 2020	50	Disc.: SDSS; Alt.: 2013 SK54	MPC; JPL
0	2002 TZ320	MBA-O	17.1	2.1 km	multiple	2002–2019	26 Nov 2019	44	Disc.: SDSS	MPC; JPL
0	2002 TC321	MBA-M	18.1	1.0 km	multiple	2002–2020	24 Jan 2020	100	Disc.: SDSS; Alt.: 2019 TR9	MPC; JPL
2	2002 TD322	MBA-M	18.55	580 m	multiple	2002–2020	21 Jan 2020	19	Disc.: SDSS	MPC; JPL
0	2002 TX322	MBA-M	18.7	760 m	multiple	2002–2019	20 Sep 2019	29	Disc.: SDSS; Added on 17 January 2021; Alt.: 2002 TX357, 2015 VC194	MPC; JPL
0	2002 TA323	MBA-M	18.22	1.3 km	multiple	2000–2020	13 Sep 2020	38	Disc.: SDSS; Added on 17 January 2021	MPC; JPL
1	2002 TO323	MBA-I	19.0	470 m	multiple	2002–2017	16 Nov 2017	24	Disc.: SDSS	MPC; JPL
0	2002 TR323	MBA-I	19.03	470 m	multiple	2002-2021	10 Apr 2021	18	Disc.: SDSS; Alt.: 2014 EJ200	MPC; JPL
0	2002 TU323	MBA-I	19.89	300 m	multiple	2002-2025	30 Sep 2025	53	Disc.: SDSS	MPC; JPL
1	2002 TA324	MBA-O	17.9	1.5 km	multiple	2002–2019	05 Nov 2019	40	Disc.: SDSS; Added on 22 July 2020	MPC; JPL
2	2002 TG324	MBA-I	18.9	490 m	multiple	2001–2016	25 Oct 2016	24	Disc.: SDSS	MPC; JPL
2	2002 TL324	MBA-M	18.6	570 m	multiple	2000–2014	23 Jun 2014	26	Disc.: SDSS; Alt.: 2006 QX66	MPC; JPL
0	2002 TC326	MBA-M	18.3	650 m	multiple	2002–2019	17 Dec 2019	28	Disc.: SDSS; Alt.: 2006 QJ173	MPC; JPL
0	2002 TL326	MBA-I	19.00	470 m	multiple	2002–2021	14 May 2021	39	Disc.: SDSS; Alt.: 2018 NX12	MPC; JPL
2	2002 TP326	MBA-I	19.5	370 m	multiple	2002–2017	10 Nov 2017	25	Disc.: SDSS; Added on 11 May 2021; Alt.: 2017 SV158	MPC; JPL
0	2002 TX326	MBA-M	18.76	530 m	multiple	2002–2016	05 Feb 2016	22	Disc.: SDSS; Added on 11 May 2021; Alt.: 2016 BE16	MPC; JPL
0	2002 TD327	MBA-M	17.97	1.4 km	multiple	2002–2022	27 Jan 2022	52	Disc.: SDSS; Added on 17 January 2021	MPC; JPL
2	2002 TE327	MBA-M	18.1	710 m	multiple	2002–2018	06 Oct 2018	54	Disc.: SDSS; Added on 22 July 2020; Alt.: 2004 DU69	MPC; JPL
1	2002 TW327	MBA-O	17.6	1.7 km	multiple	2002–2018	11 Nov 2018	31	Disc.: SDSS	MPC; JPL
0	2002 TA328	MBA-O	17.91	1.5 km	multiple	2002–2021	12 Sep 2021	42	Disc.: SDSS; Added on 29 January 2022	MPC; JPL
0	2002 TB328	MBA-M	18.0	1.1 km	multiple	1998–2019	03 Oct 2019	56	Disc.: SDSS	MPC; JPL
0	2002 TD328	MBA-I	19.48	380 m	multiple	2001–2021	08 Sep 2021	45	Disc.: SDSS	MPC; JPL
0	2002 TJ328	MBA-M	17.6	1.7 km	multiple	2002–2020	13 Sep 2020	69	Disc.: SDSS	MPC; JPL
0	2002 TR328	MBA-M	18.9	700 m	multiple	2002–2019	28 Jul 2019	24	Disc.: SDSS; Added on 21 August 2021; Alt.: 2015 RX209	MPC; JPL
0	2002 TA329	MBA-I	18.4	620 m	multiple	2002–2021	08 Jun 2021	51	Disc.: SDSS	MPC; JPL
0	2002 TK329	MBA-I	19.72	310 m	multiple	2002-2024	27 Dec 2024	53	Disc.: SDSS	MPC; JPL
0	2002 TT329	MBA-O	17.2	2.0 km	multiple	2002–2018	17 Aug 2018	37	Disc.: SDSS	MPC; JPL
0	2002 TU329	MBA-O	17.87	1.5 km	multiple	2002–2021	27 Oct 2021	37	Disc.: SDSS; Added on 17 June 2021; Alt.: 2007 UW153	MPC; JPL
0	2002 TA330	MBA-I	19.0	470 m	multiple	2002–2020	05 Dec 2020	30	Disc.: SDSS; Added on 21 August 2021; Alt.: 2020 VM22	MPC; JPL
0	2002 TB330	MBA-O	18.10	1.3 km	multiple	2002–2021	03 Aug 2021	21	Disc.: SDSS	MPC; JPL
1	2002 TG330	MBA-I	18.6	570 m	multiple	2002–2020	10 Dec 2020	33	Disc.: SDSS	MPC; JPL
2	2002 TP330	MBA-O	18.1	1.3 km	multiple	2002–2018	17 Nov 2018	36	Disc.: SDSS; Alt.: 2018 VB97	MPC; JPL
0	2002 TS330	MBA-O	17.1	2.1 km	multiple	2002–2019	19 Nov 2019	40	Disc.: SDSS	MPC; JPL
0	2002 TZ330	MBA-I	19.6	360 m	multiple	2002–2021	03 Oct 2021	36	Disc.: SDSS	MPC; JPL
2	2002 TN331	MBA-I	19.61	360 m	multiple	2002–2024	20 Apr 2024	24	Disc.: SDSS	MPC; JPL
0	2002 TO333	MBA-M	18.4	880 m	multiple	2002–2019	02 Nov 2019	22	Disc.: SDSS; Added on 22 July 2020	MPC; JPL
1	2002 TU333	MBA-I	19.32	410 m	multiple	2002–2015	10 Aug 2015	33	Disc.: SDSS	MPC; JPL
0	2002 TW333	MBA-O	16.8	2.4 km	multiple	2002–2021	12 Jan 2021	35	Disc.: SDSS; Alt.: 2019 NX32	MPC; JPL
0	2002 TJ334	MBA-O	17.90	1.5 km	multiple	2002–2021	08 Sep 2021	32	Disc.: SDSS; Added on 22 July 2020	MPC; JPL
2	2002 TL334	MBA-I	19.74	310 m	multiple	2002-2026	19 Nov 2026	20	Disc.: SDSS	MPC; JPL
0	2002 TZ334	MBA-M	18.3	650 m	multiple	2002–2019	28 Dec 2019	56	Disc.: SDSS; Alt.: 2019 SB45	MPC; JPL
2	2002 TA335	MBA-O	16.9	2.8 km	multiple	2002–2018	10 Nov 2018	44	Disc.: SDSS; Alt.: 2010 OG6	MPC; JPL
0	2002 TF335	MBA-M	17.9	1.5 km	multiple	2002–2020	10 Oct 2020	47	Disc.: SDSS	MPC; JPL
0	2002 TM335	MBA-M	18.5	1.1 km	multiple	2002–2020	08 Sep 2020	58	Disc.: SDSS; Added on 19 October 2020	MPC; JPL
1	2002 TO335	MBA-M	18.6	800 m	multiple	2002–2015	02 Nov 2015	30	Disc.: SDSS	MPC; JPL
1	2002 TY335	MBA-I	18.8	520 m	multiple	2002–2017	28 Nov 2017	27	Disc.: SDSS	MPC; JPL
0	2002 TM336	MBA-I	18.4	620 m	multiple	2002–2020	06 Dec 2020	81	Disc.: SDSS; Added on 17 January 2021	MPC; JPL
0	2002 TP336	MBA-I	19.8	330 m	multiple	2002–2018	15 Sep 2018	35	Disc.: SDSS	MPC; JPL
1	2002 TS336	MBA-M	19.1	640 m	multiple	2002–2019	03 Oct 2019	22	Disc.: SDSS; Added on 17 June 2021	MPC; JPL
1	2002 TD337	MBA-M	18.4	1.2 km	multiple	2002–2020	18 Oct 2020	20	Disc.: SDSS; Added on 17 January 2021	MPC; JPL
0	2002 TM337	MBA-M	17.97	1.4 km	multiple	2002–2021	27 Nov 2021	27	Disc.: SDSS; Added on 19 October 2020	MPC; JPL
0	2002 TN337	MBA-I	19.7	340 m	multiple	2002–2018	08 Aug 2018	22	Disc.: SDSS; Alt.: 2015 RJ232	MPC; JPL
–	2002 TD338	MBA-M	18.7	1.0 km	single	6 days	11 Oct 2002	6	Disc.: SDSS	MPC; JPL
0	2002 TJ338	MBA-M	18.52	570 m	multiple	2002-2023	04 Dec 2023	48	Disc.: SDSS	MPC; JPL
2	2002 TT338	MBA-M	18.83	520 m	multiple	2001-2023	16 Nov 2023	13	Disc.: SDSS	MPC; JPL
0	2002 TU338	MBA-M	18.89	700 m	multiple	2002–2021	14 Apr 2021	51	Disc.: SDSS	MPC; JPL
0	2002 TV338	MBA-M	18.4	620 m	multiple	1998–2016	04 Feb 2016	29	Disc.: SDSS	MPC; JPL
1	2002 TY338	MBA-I	19.9	310 m	multiple	2002–2018	17 Jun 2018	23	Disc.: SDSS	MPC; JPL
0	2002 TO339	MBA-M	18.08	1.3 km	multiple	2002–2021	09 Dec 2021	72	Disc.: SDSS; Added on 5 November 2021	MPC; JPL
0	2002 TT339	MBA-I	18.4	620 m	multiple	2002–2021	10 Mar 2021	41	Disc.: SDSS	MPC; JPL
0	2002 TX339	MBA-M	18.2	960 m	multiple	2002–2020	23 Dec 2020	40	Disc.: SDSS; Alt.: 2015 TN301	MPC; JPL
0	2002 TY339	MBA-M	17.9	1.1 km	multiple	2002–2019	22 Oct 2019	61	Disc.: SDSS	MPC; JPL
1	2002 TB340	MBA-M	18.87	900 m	multiple	2002-2021	12 Dec 2021	21	Disc.: SDSS	MPC; JPL
0	2002 TF340	MBA-M	18.0	1.4 km	multiple	2002–2020	14 Sep 2020	27	Disc.: SDSS; Added on 17 January 2021	MPC; JPL
0	2002 TJ340	MBA-I	18.5	590 m	multiple	2002–2020	17 Dec 2020	86	Disc.: SDSS; Alt.: 2013 WQ132	MPC; JPL
2	2002 TL340	MBA-I	19.14	430 m	multiple	2002-2024	07 Oct 2024	35	Disc.: SDSS	MPC; JPL
1	2002 TM340	MBA-M	17.8	1.2 km	multiple	2002–2019	08 Aug 2019	31	Disc.: SDSS; Added on 21 August 2021	
0	2002 TC341	MBA-I	18.5	590 m	multiple	2002–2020	17 Sep 2020	69	Disc.: SDSS	MPC; JPL
0	2002 TD341	MBA-M	17.9	1.1 km	multiple	2002–2019	25 Nov 2019	61	Disc.: SDSS	MPC; JPL
0	2002 TP341	MBA-I	19.04	460 m	multiple	2002–2019	24 Oct 2019	36	Disc.: SDSS; Added on 24 December 2021	MPC; JPL
0	2002 TW341	MBA-I	19.1	450 m	multiple	2002–2020	20 Oct 2020	33	Disc.: SDSS	MPC; JPL
0	2002 TD342	MBA-M	18.0	1.4 km	multiple	2002–2020	11 Sep 2020	57	Disc.: SDSS; Alt.: 2019 JP72	MPC; JPL
0	2002 TE342	MBA-I	18.5	590 m	multiple	2002–2020	10 Dec 2020	46	Disc.: SDSS; Added on 22 July 2020; Alt.: 2008 FG127	MPC; JPL
0	2002 TF342	MBA-M	17.7	1.2 km	multiple	2002–2019	28 Oct 2019	55	Disc.: SDSS	MPC; JPL
0	2002 TK342	MBA-I	18.8	520 m	multiple	1995–2020	12 Dec 2020	41	Disc.: SDSS	MPC; JPL
0	2002 TR343	MBA-M	18.2	960 m	multiple	2002–2019	28 Nov 2019	51	Disc.: SDSS	MPC; JPL
0	2002 TS343	MBA-M	18.2	680 m	multiple	2002–2018	21 Aug 2018	35	Disc.: SDSS	MPC; JPL
0	2002 TC344	MBA-M	18.2	960 m	multiple	2002–2019	25 Sep 2019	42	Disc.: SDSS; Alt.: 2016 AR2	MPC; JPL
0	2002 TM344	MBA-M	18.6	800 m	multiple	2002–2015	14 Aug 2015	25	Disc.: SDSS	MPC; JPL
1	2002 TW344	MBA-I	19.61	360 m	multiple	2002–2019	29 Oct 2019	18	Disc.: SDSS; Added on 24 December 2021	MPC; JPL
0	2002 TE345	MBA-I	19.0	470 m	multiple	2002–2020	15 Dec 2020	30	Disc.: SDSS; Added on 5 November 2021	MPC; JPL
0	2002 TF345	MBA-M	17.83	1.5 km	multiple	2002–2022	26 Jan 2022	55	Disc.: SDSS	MPC; JPL
–	2002 TO345	MCA	20.1	530 m	single	6 days	11 Oct 2002	6	Disc.: SDSS	MPC; JPL
1	2002 TQ345	MBA-I	19.84	330 m	multiple	2002-2020	20 Oct 2020	21	Disc.: SDSS	MPC; JPL
0	2002 TS345	MBA-I	18.43	520 m	multiple	2002-2025	01 Apr 2025	64	Disc.: SDSS	MPC; JPL
1	2002 TG346	MBA-M	19.12	770 m	multiple	2002-2025	16 Aug 2025	42	Disc.: SDSS	MPC; JPL
0	2002 TH346	MBA-O	17.6	1.7 km	multiple	2002–2018	03 Oct 2018	26	Disc.: SDSS	MPC; JPL
0	2002 TM346	MBA-O	17.78	1.5 km	multiple	2002–2019	27 Oct 2019	23	Disc.: SDSS; Added on 24 December 2021	MPC; JPL
0	2002 TY347	MBA-M	18.0	1.4 km	multiple	2002–2020	09 Oct 2020	55	Disc.: SDSS; Added on 9 March 2021; Alt.: 2020 PG38	MPC; JPL
0	2002 TC348	MBA-O	17.3	1.9 km	multiple	2002–2015	22 Jan 2015	22	Disc.: SDSS; Alt.: 2015 BQ105	MPC; JPL
0	2002 TD349	MBA-O	16.8	2.4 km	multiple	2002–2021	14 Jun 2021	15	Disc.: SDSS; Added on 21 August 2021; Alt.: 2021 JJ50	MPC; JPL
0	2002 TK349	MBA-M	18.0	1.1 km	multiple	2002–2019	21 Nov 2019	112	Disc.: SDSS	MPC; JPL
0	2002 TV349	MBA-M	18.41	870 m	multiple	2002–2019	29 Oct 2019	36	Disc.: SDSS	MPC; JPL
0	2002 TV350	MBA-O	17.41	1.8 km	multiple	2002–2018	29 Nov 2018	31	Disc.: SDSS; Added on 17 June 2021; Alt.: 2017 MJ6	MPC; JPL
0	2002 TM351	MBA-I	18.6	570 m	multiple	2002–2020	14 Dec 2020	60	Disc.: SDSS; Added on 17 January 2021	MPC; JPL
0	2002 TU351	MBA-I	18.9	490 m	multiple	2002–2016	08 Oct 2016	34	Disc.: SDSS	MPC; JPL
0	2002 TB352	MBA-M	18.7	760 m	multiple	2002–2020	10 Dec 2020	38	Disc.: SDSS	MPC; JPL
0	2002 TD352	MBA-M	17.7	1.6 km	multiple	2002–2020	11 Oct 2020	66	Disc.: SDSS	MPC; JPL
0	2002 TH352	MBA-M	17.9	1.5 km	multiple	2002–2020	12 Nov 2020	59	Disc.: SDSS	MPC; JPL
0	2002 TG353	MBA-I	18.4	620 m	multiple	2002–2020	11 Dec 2020	92	Disc.: SDSS; Alt.: 2002 TZ317, 2013 YW22	MPC; JPL
0	2002 TR355	MBA-M	17.81	1.5 km	multiple	2002–2022	27 Jan 2022	76	Disc.: SDSS	MPC; JPL
0	2002 TS355	MBA-M	18.49	1.1 km	multiple	2002–2020	16 Oct 2020	42	Disc.: SDSS; Added on 19 October 2020	MPC; JPL
0	2002 TH356	MBA-M	18.4	880 m	multiple	2002–2019	03 Oct 2019	52	Disc.: SDSS	MPC; JPL
0	2002 TN356	MBA-I	18.7	540 m	multiple	2002–2020	14 Nov 2020	42	Disc.: SDSS; Alt.: 2020 RX30	MPC; JPL
0	2002 TD357	MBA-I	18.8	520 m	multiple	2002–2020	15 Oct 2020	39	Disc.: SDSS; Added on 17 January 2021	MPC; JPL
0	2002 TP357	MBA-I	19.2	430 m	multiple	2002–2019	25 Oct 2019	40	Disc.: SDSS; Added on 21 August 2021; Alt.: 2009 WX204, 2019 SC164	MPC; JPL
1	2002 TZ357	MBA-I	18.3	650 m	multiple	2002–2020	16 Mar 2020	52	Disc.: SDSS; Added on 22 July 2020; Alt.: 2006 SH182	MPC; JPL
0	2002 TA358	MBA-O	17.7	1.6 km	multiple	2002–2018	10 Oct 2018	39	Disc.: SDSS	MPC; JPL
0	2002 TR358	MBA-O	17.99	1.4 km	multiple	2002–2018	30 Sep 2018	18	Disc.: SDSS	MPC; JPL
0	2002 TV358	MBA-M	18.52	490 m	multiple	2002-2023	13 Nov 2023	65	Disc.: SDSS	MPC; JPL
1	2002 TK359	MBA-I	19.2	430 m	multiple	2002–2016	05 Nov 2016	36	Disc.: SDSS; Alt.: 2009 SP269	MPC; JPL
1	2002 TL359	MBA-O	18.38	1.2 km	multiple	2002-2023	09 Dec 2023	46	Disc.: SDSS; Alt.: 2023 TW113	MPC; JPL
0	2002 TS359	MBA-M	18.68	770 m	multiple	2002–2021	07 Jan 2021	25	Disc.: SDSS; Added on 29 January 2022	MPC; JPL
0	2002 TA360	MBA-I	19.27	420 m	multiple	2002–2021	13 Jul 2021	37	Disc.: SDSS	MPC; JPL
0	2002 TN360	MBA-M	18.2	1.3 km	multiple	2002–2020	08 Nov 2020	49	Disc.: SDSS; Added on 17 January 2021; Alt.: 2011 SE127, 2011 SW276	MPC; JPL
0	2002 TU360	MBA-M	17.8	820 m	multiple	2002–2016	06 Feb 2016	25	Disc.: SDSS	MPC; JPL
0	2002 TL361	MBA-O	17.5	1.8 km	multiple	2002–2019	28 Nov 2019	25	Disc.: SDSS; Added on 21 August 2021	MPC; JPL
0	2002 TW361	MBA-M	18.3	1.2 km	multiple	2002–2016	07 Nov 2016	32	Disc.: SDSS; Added on 22 July 2020	MPC; JPL
0	2002 TD362	MBA-I	19.1	450 m	multiple	2002–2019	10 Jun 2019	21	Disc.: SDSS; Added on 22 July 2020	MPC; JPL
2	2002 TE362	MBA-I	19.3	410 m	multiple	2002–2014	13 Dec 2014	35	Disc.: SDSS; Alt.: 2006 UP169	MPC; JPL
0	2002 TH362	MBA-O	17.4	1.8 km	multiple	2002–2017	17 Aug 2017	26	Disc.: SDSS; Added on 22 July 2020; Alt.: 2007 TH401	MPC; JPL
1	2002 TT362	MBA-O	18.4	1.2 km	multiple	2002–2021	03 Oct 2021	22	Disc.: SDSS; Added on 5 November 2021	MPC; JPL
0	2002 TW362	MBA-O	16.9	2.3 km	multiple	2002–2019	29 Sep 2019	30	Disc.: SDSS; Added on 22 July 2020; Alt.: 2016 CH96	MPC; JPL
0	2002 TB363	MBA-I	18.75	530 m	multiple	2002–2021	29 Nov 2021	64	Disc.: SDSS; Alt.: 2002 TB336	MPC; JPL
0	2002 TG364	MBA-I	18.9	490 m	multiple	2002–2020	10 Oct 2020	27	Disc.: SDSS; Added on 17 January 2021	MPC; JPL
0	2002 TJ364	MBA-M	18.2	960 m	multiple	2001–2019	04 Nov 2019	32	Disc.: SDSS	MPC; JPL
0	2002 TM364	MBA-I	18.68	550 m	multiple	2002–2021	06 Nov 2021	70	Disc.: SDSS; Added on 21 August 2021	MPC; JPL
2	2002 TQ364	MBA-O	17.6	1.7 km	multiple	2002–2019	02 Nov 2019	36	Disc.: SDSS	MPC; JPL
0	2002 TU364	MBA-I	18.98	480 m	multiple	2002–2021	09 May 2021	62	Disc.: SDSS; Alt.: 2015 RU121	MPC; JPL
1	2002 TV364	MBA-I	19.7	340 m	multiple	2002–2019	24 Oct 2019	35	Disc.: SDSS	MPC; JPL
1	2002 TA365	MBA-O	17.2	2.0 km	multiple	2002–2017	21 Sep 2017	42	Disc.: SDSS	MPC; JPL
0	2002 TD365	MBA-O	17.0	2.2 km	multiple	2002–2019	28 Nov 2019	58	Disc.: SDSS	MPC; JPL
–	2002 TS365	MBA-M	18.6	570 m	single	20 days	29 Oct 2002	13	Disc.: SDSS	MPC; JPL
0	2002 TX365	MBA-M	18.8	730 m	multiple	2002–2019	26 Nov 2019	48	Disc.: SDSS; Alt.: 2015 XD111	MPC; JPL
0	2002 TP366	MBA-M	18.04	1.4 km	multiple	2002–2021	30 Nov 2021	53	Disc.: SDSS	MPC; JPL
1	2002 TR366	MBA-I	19.0	470 m	multiple	2001–2019	10 Jan 2019	38	Disc.: SDSS; Alt.: 2010 XL10	MPC; JPL
1	2002 TL367	MBA-I	19.2	430 m	multiple	2002–2013	12 Oct 2013	29	Disc.: SDSS; Alt.: 2013 RF118	MPC; JPL
0	2002 TM367	MBA-O	16.0	3.4 km	multiple	2002.2022	21 May 2022	209	Disc.: SDSS; Alt.: 2011 FH32	MPC; JPL
0	2002 TP367	MBA-M	18.5	840 m	multiple	2002–2019	02 Nov 2019	58	Disc.: SDSS; Alt.: 2012 BS83	MPC; JPL
1	2002 TW367	MBA-M	18.4	620 m	multiple	2002–2020	02 Feb 2020	31	Disc.: SDSS; Added on 22 July 2020	MPC; JPL
0	2002 TY367	MCA	19.7	340 m	multiple	2002–2020	17 Oct 2020	43	Disc.: SDSS	MPC; JPL
0	2002 TK368	MBA-I	18.43	610 m	multiple	2002–2021	05 Oct 2021	55	Disc.: SDSS	MPC; JPL
2	2002 TO368	MBA-M	18.88	670 m	multiple	2002-2023	05 Nov 2023	38	Disc.: SDSS; Alt.: 2023 SV46	MPC; JPL
0	2002 TR368	MBA-M	18.4	880 m	multiple	2002–2019	25 Sep 2019	76	Disc.: SDSS; Alt.: 2015 UY43	MPC; JPL
–	2002 TW368	MBA-I	20.3	260 m	single	28 days	07 Nov 2002	10	Disc.: SDSS	MPC; JPL
0	2002 TL369	MBA-I	18.4	620 m	multiple	2002–2019	29 Jun 2019	32	Disc.: SDSS	MPC; JPL
0	2002 TP369	MBA-O	16.9	2.3 km	multiple	2002–2019	25 Oct 2019	37	Disc.: SDSS; Added on 22 July 2020	MPC; JPL
0	2002 TL370	MBA-M	17.6	1.7 km	multiple	2002–2020	16 Sep 2020	66	Disc.: SDSS; Alt.: 2016 UZ250	MPC; JPL
2	2002 TM370	MBA-I	18.45	620 m	multiple	2002-2021	08 Sep 2021	13	Disc.: SDSS	MPC; JPL
0	2002 TG371	MBA-M	18.26	1.2 km	multiple	2002–2021	07 Feb 2021	73	Disc.: SDSS; Alt.: 2015 PU79	MPC; JPL
1	2002 TQ371	MBA-M	18.8	730 m	multiple	2002–2019	29 Nov 2019	27	Disc.: SDSS	MPC; JPL
0	2002 TT371	MBA-M	18.2	960 m	multiple	2002–2019	28 Nov 2019	44	Disc.: SDSS	MPC; JPL
0	2002 TH374	MBA-M	17.9	780 m	multiple	2002–2019	19 Dec 2019	45	Disc.: NEAT	MPC; JPL
1	2002 TE377	MCA	19.6	360 m	multiple	2002–2015	09 Jul 2015	41	Disc.: SDSS	MPC; JPL
0	2002 TX377	MBA-M	17.91	780 m	multiple	2002–2021	12 Feb 2021	31	Disc.: NEAT; Alt.: 2010 JL188	MPC; JPL
1	2002 TG378	MBA-M	18.5	590 m	multiple	2002–2020	24 Jan 2020	32	Disc.: NEAT	MPC; JPL
0	2002 TC379	MBA-M	17.9	1.1 km	multiple	2002–2019	22 Oct 2019	42	Disc.: NEAT; Alt.: 2015 TO251	MPC; JPL
–	2002 TM379	MBA-I	19.2	430 m	single	2 days	06 Oct 2002	9	Disc.: NEAT	MPC; JPL
2	2002 TW379	MBA-M	18.83	1.0 km	multiple	2002-2024	29 Sep 2024	21	Disc.: NEAT; Alt.: 2024 QR40	MPC; JPL
1	2002 TX379	MBA-O	17.6	1.7 km	multiple	2002–2013	08 Nov 2013	25	Disc.: NEAT; Added on 21 August 2021	MPC; JPL
1	2002 TE380	MBA-O	18.13	1.3 km	multiple	2002-2023	09 Oct 2023	49	Disc.: NEAT	MPC; JPL
2	2002 TH380	MBA-I	19.5	370 m	multiple	2002–2012	13 Sep 2012	20	Disc.: NEAT	MPC; JPL
2	2002 TC381	MBA-M	18.5	840 m	multiple	2002–2019	24 Sep 2019	21	Disc.: NEAT	MPC; JPL
1	2002 TD383	MBA-M	18.12	1.3 km	multiple	2002-2025	15 Sep 2025	35	Disc.: SDSS	MPC; JPL
0	2002 TE383	MBA-M	18.09	1.0 km	multiple	2002–2021	16 Apr 2021	60	Disc.: SDSS	MPC; JPL
0	2002 TR384	MBA-M	17.7	1.6 km	multiple	2002–2020	17 Sep 2020	33	Disc.: SDSS	MPC; JPL
2	2002 TU384	MBA-O	17.86	1.5 km	multiple	2002-2022	22 Sep 2022	41	Disc.: SDSS	MPC; JPL
0	2002 TW385	MBA-I	19.25	420 m	multiple	2002–2021	06 Oct 2021	45	Disc.: NEAT; Added on 5 November 2021	MPC; JPL
0	2002 TS386	MBA-O	17.6	1.7 km	multiple	2002–2018	30 Sep 2018	39	Disc.: NEAT	MPC; JPL
0	2002 TD387	MBA-I	18.6	570 m	multiple	2002–2018	07 Mar 2018	25	Disc.: NEAT	MPC; JPL
1	2002 TG388	MBA-M	18.1	1.3 km	multiple	2002–2021	14 Nov 2021	44	Disc.: LPL/Spacewatch II; Added on 29 January 2022	MPC; JPL
3	2002 TN388	MBA-M	17.2	1.1 km	multiple	2002–2021	01 Jul 2021	27	Disc.: NEAT	MPC; JPL
–	2002 TS388	MBA-M	17.2	1.5 km	single	27 days	06 Nov 2002	9	Disc.: NEAT	MPC; JPL
0	2002 TJ390	MBA-I	18.62	560 m	multiple	2002–2021	30 Nov 2021	55	Disc.: NEAT	MPC; JPL
0	2002 TC391	MBA-M	17.6	1.3 km	multiple	2002–2019	28 Nov 2019	62	Disc.: NEAT; Alt.: 2019 PA19	MPC; JPL
0	2002 TN392	MBA-I	19.0	470 m	multiple	2002–2019	03 Dec 2019	49	Disc.: LPL/Spacewatch II	MPC; JPL
0	2002 TC393	MBA-O	17.2	2.0 km	multiple	2002–2018	01 Oct 2018	38	Disc.: LPL/Spacewatch II	MPC; JPL
0	2002 TF393	MBA-I	19.1	450 m	multiple	2002–2018	13 Aug 2018	36	Disc.: LPL/Spacewatch II	MPC; JPL
0	2002 TO393	MBA-M	18.6	800 m	multiple	2002–2019	25 Oct 2019	34	Disc.: LPL/Spacewatch II	MPC; JPL
0	2002 TR393	MBA-M	17.8	1.2 km	multiple	2002–2019	26 Sep 2019	136	Disc.: LPL/Spacewatch II	MPC; JPL
0	2002 TW393	MBA-M	17.9	1.1 km	multiple	2002–2021	18 Jan 2021	45	Disc.: LPL/Spacewatch II	MPC; JPL
0	2002 TY393	MBA-M	17.94	1.4 km	multiple	2002–2021	11 Nov 2021	46	Disc.: LPL/Spacewatch II	MPC; JPL
0	2002 TG394	MBA-O	17.2	2.0 km	multiple	2002–2019	28 Nov 2019	40	Disc.: LPL/Spacewatch II	MPC; JPL
1	2002 TW394	MBA-I	18.6	570 m	multiple	2002–2020	26 Jul 2020	21	Disc.: NEAT; Added on 21 August 2021	MPC; JPL

back to top
