= List of unnumbered minor planets: 2002 Q (0–119) =

This is a partial list of unnumbered minor planets for principal provisional designations assigned during 16–31 August 2002. Since this period yielded a high number of provisional discoveries, it is further split into several standalone pages. As of March 2026, a total of 121 bodies remain unnumbered for this period. Objects for this year are listed on the following pages: A–B · C · D–F · G–K · L–O · P · Q_{i} · Q_{ii} · R_{i} · R_{ii} · S · T_{i} · T_{ii} · U–V and W–Y. Also see previous and next year.

| Near-Earth obj. | MBA (inner) | MBA (outer) | Centaur |
| Mars-crosser | MBA (middle) | Jupiter trojan | Trans-Neptunian obj. |
| Unclassified |

== Q ==
| U | Designation | Class | Physical | | Observations | | | | Description and notes | Ref |
| U | Designation | Class | H | D | Opp. | Arc | Last | Used | Description and notes | Ref |
|---|---|---|---|---|---|---|---|---|---|---|
| 3 | 2002 QC1 | MBA-M | 18.7 | 540 m | multiple | 2002–2018 | 10 Jul 2018 | 31 | Disc.: NEAT | MPC · JPL |
| 0 | 2002 QU6 | MCA | 19.3 | 410 m | multiple | 2002–2021 | 08 Jun 2021 | 163 | Disc.: LINEAR | MPC · JPL |
| 0 | 2002 QW6 | MCA | 19.4 | 390 m | multiple | 2002–2021 | 10 Aug 2021 | 66 | Disc.: AMOS; Alt.: 2021 HV22 | MPC · JPL |
| 1 | 2002 QX6 | MCA | 19.0 | 880 m | multiple | 2002–2019 | 01 Oct 2019 | 84 | Disc.: NEAT | MPC · JPL |
| 0 | 2002 QZ6 | AMO | 19.7 | 410 m | multiple | 2002–2013 | 08 Oct 2013 | 413 | Disc.: AMOS | MPC · JPL |
| 4 | 2002 QH10 | AMO | 20.3 | 310 m | single | 114 days | 12 Dec 2002 | 179 | Disc.: NEAT; Potentially hazardous object | MPC · JPL |
| 0 | 2002 QL10 | MCA | 19.85 | 320 m | multiple | 2002–2021 | 08 Nov 2021 | 63 | Disc.: NEAT | MPC · JPL |
| 0 | 2002 QM10 | MBA-O | 17.1 | 2.1 km | multiple | 2002–2018 | 18 Aug 2018 | 30 | Disc.: NEAT; Alt.: 2013 VF1 | MPC · JPL |
| 0 | 2002 QD12 | MBA-M | 18.3 | 650 m | multiple | 2002–2020 | 22 Jan 2020 | 70 | Disc.: NEAT | MPC · JPL |
| 0 | 2002 QR12 | MCA | 19.22 | 430 m | multiple | 2002–2021 | 25 Nov 2021 | 81 | Disc.: NEAT | MPC · JPL |
| 0 | 2002 QB15 | MBA-O | 16.3 | 3.1 km | multiple | 2002–2021 | 06 Jan 2021 | 121 | Disc.: NEAT | MPC · JPL |
| 2 | 2002 QG17 | MCA | 19.58 | 450 m | multiple | 2002-2026 | 09 Aug 2026 | 39 | Disc.: NEAT | MPC · JPL |
| 1 | 2002 QA22 | MBA-O | 17.3 | 1.9 km | multiple | 2002–2014 | 24 Dec 2014 | 78 | Disc.: NEAT; Alt.: 2008 SG226 | MPC · JPL |
| 0 | 2002 QL23 | MBA-M | 17.7 | 860 m | multiple | 2002–2020 | 22 Jan 2020 | 82 | Disc.: NEAT | MPC · JPL |
| 0 | 2002 QH24 | MBA-M | 18.3 | 920 m | multiple | 2002–2019 | 28 May 2019 | 26 | Disc.: NEAT; Alt.: 2015 MQ14 | MPC · JPL |
| 0 | 2002 QQ24 | MBA-I | 18.7 | 540 m | multiple | 2002–2020 | 03 Nov 2020 | 74 | Disc.: NEAT | MPC · JPL |
| 0 | 2002 QK25 | MBA-I | 19.36 | 400 m | multiple | 2002–2021 | 27 Nov 2021 | 68 | Disc.: LPL/Spacewatch II | MPC · JPL |
| 0 | 2002 QU25 | MBA-I | 19.27 | 420 m | multiple | 2002–2021 | 31 Oct 2021 | 72 | Disc.: LPL/Spacewatch II | MPC · JPL |
| 2 | 2002 QV38 | MBA-O | 17.58 | 1.7 km | multiple | 2002-2023 | 11 Oct 2023 | 45 | Disc.: LPL/Spacewatch II | MPC · JPL |
| 1 | 2002 QB40 | MBA-O | 16.7 | 2.5 km | multiple | 2002–2019 | 29 Nov 2019 | 70 | Disc.: NEAT; Alt.: 2019 OW15 | MPC · JPL |
| 2 | 2002 QQ40 | APO | 21.48 | 180 m | multiple | 2002–2018 | 07 Aug 2018 | 74 | Disc.: NEAT; Potentially hazardous object | MPC · JPL |
| 0 | 2002 QE46 | MBA-O | 16.2 | 3.2 km | multiple | 2002–2019 | 21 Jan 2019 | 121 | Disc.: NEAT; Alt.: 2010 LL10 | MPC · JPL |
| 2 | 2002 QE47 | AMO | 22.2 | 130 m | multiple | 2002–2007 | 30 Dec 2007 | 43 | Disc.: LPL/Spacewatch II | MPC · JPL |
| 0 | 2002 QV47 | MBA-O | 17.39 | 3.2 km | multiple | 2002-2024 | 29 Nov 2024 | 79 | Disc.: Table Mountain Obs. | MPC · JPL |
| 1 | 2002 QW47 | APO | 20.5 | 280 m | multiple | 2002–2016 | 09 Oct 2016 | 51 | Disc.: NEAT; Potentially hazardous object | MPC · JPL |
| | 2002 QE49 | MBA-M | 17.4 | 980 m | multiple | 2002–2019 | 17 Dec 2019 | 105 | Disc.: NEAT | MPC · JPL |
| 1 | 2002 QM49 | MBA-M | 18.2 | 1.3 km | multiple | 2002–2020 | 17 Oct 2020 | 85 | Disc.: NEAT; Alt.: 2011 QY13 | MPC · JPL |
| 2 | 2002 QP49 | MBA-I | 18.8 | 520 m | multiple | 2002–2016 | 04 Oct 2016 | 35 | Disc.: NEAT | MPC · JPL |
| 1 | 2002 QE50 | MBA-O | 15.8 | 3.9 km | multiple | 2002–2020 | 21 May 2020 | 180 | Disc.: NEAT | MPC · JPL |
| 1 | 2002 QG50 | MBA-M | 17.8 | 820 m | multiple | 2001–2019 | 28 Nov 2019 | 132 | Disc.: NEAT | MPC · JPL |
| 0 | 2002 QZ50 | MBA-M | 17.4 | 1.4 km | multiple | 1998–2020 | 14 Dec 2020 | 147 | Disc.: NEAT; Alt.: 2011 UQ29 | MPC · JPL |
| 1 | 2002 QL51 | MCA | 18.6 | 570 m | multiple | 2002–2012 | 21 Oct 2012 | 26 | Disc.: NEAT | MPC · JPL |
| – | 2002 QQ52 | MBA-M | 18.4 | 620 m | single | 35 days | 16 Sep 2002 | 24 | Disc.: NEAT | MPC · JPL |
| 0 | 2002 QP57 | MBA-O | 16.9 | 2.3 km | multiple | 2002–2019 | 09 Oct 2019 | 31 | Disc.: NEAT | MPC · JPL |
| 0 | 2002 QN58 | MBA-I | 18.9 | 490 m | multiple | 2002–2019 | 29 Nov 2019 | 54 | Disc.: NEAT | MPC · JPL |
| 3 | 2002 QZ59 | MCA | 19.6 | 360 m | single | 82 days | 11 Oct 2002 | 24 | Disc.: NEAT | MPC · JPL |
| 2 | 2002 QE60 | MBA-O | 16.7 | 2.4 km | multiple | 2002–2018 | 04 Dec 2018 | 41 | Disc.: NEAT; Alt.: 2010 LV32 | MPC · JPL |
| 0 | 2002 QD61 | MBA-I | 18.8 | 520 m | multiple | 2002–2019 | 08 Jun 2019 | 28 | Disc.: NEAT; Added on 22 July 2020 | MPC · JPL |
| 0 | 2002 QG63 | MBA-M | 17.8 | 1.2 km | multiple | 2002–2019 | 28 Nov 2019 | 102 | Disc.: NEAT; Alt.: 2015 TC232 | MPC · JPL |
| 2 | 2002 QZ64 | MCA | 19.5 | 370 m | multiple | 2002–2019 | 29 Nov 2019 | 47 | Disc.: NEAT | MPC · JPL |
| 0 | 2002 QX67 | MBA-M | 17.9 | 1.1 km | multiple | 2002–2020 | 20 Oct 2020 | 59 | Disc.: NEAT | MPC · JPL |
| 0 | 2002 QS68 | MBA-O | 16.4 | 2.9 km | multiple | 2002–2019 | 25 Oct 2019 | 35 | Disc.: NEAT | MPC · JPL |
| 4 | 2002 QT68 | MBA-I | 19.26 | 370 m | multiple | 2002-2026 | 14 Mar 2026 | 35 | Disc.: NEAT | MPC · JPL |
| 1 | 2002 QE69 | MBA-M | 18.4 | 620 m | multiple | 2002–2019 | 17 Dec 2019 | 28 | Disc.: AMOS | MPC · JPL |
| 0 | 2002 QT69 | MBA-M | 18.3 | 650 m | multiple | 2002–2019 | 28 Nov 2019 | 45 | Disc.: NEAT | MPC · JPL |
| 0 | 2002 QV69 | MBA-M | 18.1 | 1.0 km | multiple | 2002–2019 | 25 Sep 2019 | 93 | Disc.: NEAT | MPC · JPL |
| 2 | 2002 QY69 | MBA-M | 18.0 | 750 m | multiple | 1994–2018 | 13 Jul 2018 | 33 | Disc.: NEAT | MPC · JPL |
| 1 | 2002 QE72 | MBA-O | 17.0 | 2.2 km | multiple | 2002–2018 | 11 Jul 2018 | 22 | Disc.: NEAT | MPC · JPL |
| 0 | 2002 QS72 | MBA-O | 17.19 | 2.0 km | multiple | 2002–2021 | 09 Apr 2021 | 44 | Disc.: NEAT; Alt.: 2015 AF203 | MPC · JPL |
| – | 2002 QX73 | MBA-I | 19.6 | 360 m | single | 20 days | 28 Aug 2002 | 11 | Disc.: NEAT | MPC · JPL |
| 0 | 2002 QG74 | MBA-I | 18.7 | 540 m | multiple | 2002–2020 | 22 Mar 2020 | 41 | Disc.: NEAT; Alt.: 2015 TB259 | MPC · JPL |
| 0 | 2002 QE75 | MBA-M | 18.3 | 900 m | multiple | 2002-2020 | 05 Nov 2020 | 34 | Disc.: NEAT | MPC · JPL |
| 2 | 2002 QH75 | MBA-I | 19.1 | 450 m | multiple | 2002–2016 | 28 Aug 2016 | 21 | Disc.: NEAT; Added on 21 August 2021 | MPC · JPL |
| 0 | 2002 QT75 | MBA-I | 18.98 | 480 m | multiple | 2002–2020 | 20 Oct 2020 | 30 | Disc.: NEAT | MPC · JPL |
| 0 | 2002 QA76 | MBA-I | 18.5 | 590 m | multiple | 2002–2019 | 11 May 2019 | 35 | Disc.: NEAT | MPC · JPL |
| 1 | 2002 QM76 | MBA-O | 17.79 | 1.5 km | multiple | 2002–2021 | 04 Sep 2021 | 27 | Disc.: NEAT; Alt.: 2021 NK34 | MPC · JPL |
| 0 | 2002 QN76 | MBA-O | 17.0 | 2.2 km | multiple | 2002–2019 | 07 Oct 2019 | 22 | Disc.: NEAT | MPC · JPL |
| 1 | 2002 QA77 | MCA | 19.6 | 360 m | multiple | 2002–2018 | 12 Jul 2018 | 26 | Disc.: NEAT | MPC · JPL |
| 0 | 2002 QS77 | MBA-I | 18.6 | 570 m | multiple | 2002–2019 | 28 Nov 2019 | 65 | Disc.: NEAT | MPC · JPL |
| 0 | 2002 QZ77 | MBA-I | 18.8 | 520 m | multiple | 2002–2020 | 22 Sep 2020 | 56 | Disc.: NEAT | MPC · JPL |
| 1 | 2002 QK80 | MBA-O | 17.24 | 1.9 km | multiple | 2002–2025 | 15 Oct 2025 | 69 | Disc.: NEAT | MPC · JPL |
| 0 | 2002 QA82 | MBA-O | 17.3 | 1.9 km | multiple | 2002–2018 | 06 Oct 2018 | 39 | Disc.: NEAT | MPC · JPL |
| 0 | 2002 QE82 | MBA-M | 18.2 | 960 m | multiple | 2002–2019 | 29 Jun 2019 | 57 | Disc.: NEAT | MPC · JPL |
| 0 | 2002 QS82 | MBA-I | 18.9 | 490 m | multiple | 2002–2019 | 26 Sep 2019 | 36 | Disc.: NEAT | MPC · JPL |
| 1 | 2002 QX82 | MBA-I | 19.1 | 450 m | multiple | 2002–2017 | 27 Nov 2017 | 47 | Disc.: NEAT | MPC · JPL |
| 0 | 2002 QA84 | MBA-O | 17.5 | 1.8 km | multiple | 2002–2019 | 04 Feb 2019 | 36 | Disc.: NEAT | MPC · JPL |
| 1 | 2002 QA85 | MCA | 18.54 | 730 m | multiple | 2002-2023 | 15 Oct 2023 | 43 | Disc.: NEAT | MPC · JPL |
| 1 | 2002 QM85 | MCA | 20.1 | 280 m | multiple | 2002–2020 | 19 Nov 2020 | 110 | Disc.: NEAT | MPC · JPL |
| 0 | 2002 QV86 | MBA-M | 18.3 | 650 m | multiple | 2002–2019 | 01 Nov 2019 | 34 | Disc.: NEAT | MPC · JPL |
| 1 | 2002 QX86 | MBA-O | 17.3 | 1.9 km | multiple | 2002–2019 | 24 Oct 2019 | 36 | Disc.: NEAT | MPC · JPL |
| 0 | 2002 QJ87 | MBA-I | 18.7 | 540 m | multiple | 2002–2020 | 11 Nov 2020 | 37 | Disc.: NEAT | MPC · JPL |
| 0 | 2002 QS87 | MBA-I | 18.8 | 520 m | multiple | 2002–2019 | 28 Aug 2019 | 38 | Disc.: NEAT | MPC · JPL |
| 0 | 2002 QD88 | MBA-M | 18.2 | 960 m | multiple | 2002–2019 | 20 Sep 2019 | 41 | Disc.: NEAT; Alt.: 2010 NJ62 | MPC · JPL |
| 0 | 2002 QE88 | MBA-M | 18.8 | 730 m | multiple | 2002–2019 | 25 Sep 2019 | 109 | Disc.: NEAT | MPC · JPL |
| 1 | 2002 QJ88 | MBA-M | 18.1 | 710 m | multiple | 2002–2018 | 21 Jun 2018 | 62 | Disc.: NEAT; Alt.: 2014 OA371 | MPC · JPL |
| 1 | 2002 QY88 | MBA-I | 18.9 | 490 m | multiple | 2002–2017 | 13 Nov 2017 | 48 | Disc.: NEAT; Alt.: 2013 ND16 | MPC · JPL |
| E | 2002 QM89 | MBA-I | 19.6 | 360 m | single | 2 days | 29 Aug 2002 | 8 | Disc.: NEAT | MPC · JPL |
| 2 | 2002 QQ89 | MBA-I | 19.0 | 470 m | multiple | 2002–2013 | 25 Sep 2013 | 25 | Disc.: NEAT; Alt.: 2013 RT61 | MPC · JPL |
| 3 | 2002 QF91 | MBA-M | 18.0 | 750 m | multiple | 2002–2018 | 11 Jul 2018 | 24 | Disc.: NEAT | MPC · JPL |
| 0 | 2002 QW91 | MBA-O | 17.1 | 2.1 km | multiple | 2002–2018 | 18 Aug 2018 | 31 | Disc.: NEAT | MPC · JPL |
| 0 | 2002 QE92 | MBA-O | 17.0 | 2.2 km | multiple | 2002–2018 | 16 Sep 2018 | 63 | Disc.: NEAT | MPC · JPL |
| 0 | 2002 QD93 | MBA-I | 18.4 | 620 m | multiple | 2002–2021 | 15 Apr 2021 | 33 | Disc.: NEAT | MPC · JPL |
| 2 | 2002 QL94 | MBA-M | 18.3 | 1.2 km | multiple | 2002–2020 | 14 Sep 2020 | 32 | Disc.: NEAT | MPC · JPL |
| 0 | 2002 QM94 | MCA | 19.20 | 610 m | multiple | 2002–2015 | 09 Sep 2015 | 19 | Disc.: NEAT | MPC · JPL |
| 1 | 2002 QE97 | MBA-I | 19.1 | 450 m | multiple | 2002–2018 | 16 Apr 2018 | 17 | Disc.: NEAT | MPC · JPL |
| 0 | 2002 QK97 | MBA-I | 19.12 | 450 m | multiple | 2002-2023 | 17 Jun 2023 | 35 | Disc.: NEAT | MPC · JPL |
| 0 | 2002 QY97 | MBA-O | 17.71 | 1.3 km | multiple | 2002-2024 | 05 Dec 2024 | 70 | Disc.: NEAT | MPC · JPL |
| 3 | 2002 QR98 | MBA-M | 18.1 | 1.3 km | multiple | 2002–2020 | 16 Sep 2020 | 47 | Disc.: NEAT; Alt.: 2011 QX14 | MPC · JPL |
| 0 | 2002 QU98 | MCA | 19.0 | 470 m | multiple | 2002–2019 | 31 May 2019 | 58 | Disc.: NEAT; Alt.: 2012 DL54, 2016 RO19 | MPC · JPL |
| 0 | 2002 QH99 | MBA-M | 18.3 | 920 m | multiple | 2002–2019 | 30 Aug 2019 | 74 | Disc.: NEAT | MPC · JPL |
| 0 | 2002 QD100 | HUN | 18.70 | 540 m | multiple | 2002–2018 | 12 Oct 2018 | 44 | Disc.: NEAT | MPC · JPL |
| 1 | 2002 QO100 | MBA-O | 16.0 | 3.5 km | multiple | 2002–2019 | 03 Jan 2019 | 95 | Disc.: NEAT; Alt.: 2010 RV9 | MPC · JPL |
| 0 | 2002 QH101 | MBA-M | 17.8 | 1.5 km | multiple | 2002–2020 | 11 Oct 2020 | 76 | Disc.: NEAT | MPC · JPL |
| 0 | 2002 QG102 | MBA-M | 17.4 | 980 m | multiple | 2002–2014 | 23 Aug 2014 | 21 | Disc.: NEAT; Alt.: 2014 QL155 | MPC · JPL |
| 0 | 2002 QS104 | MBA-M | 18.36 | 1.2 km | multiple | 2002–2022 | 07 Jan 2022 | 52 | Disc.: NEAT | MPC · JPL |
| 1 | 2002 QV104 | MCA | 19.5 | 370 m | multiple | 2002–2012 | 22 Sep 2012 | 23 | Disc.: NEAT | MPC · JPL |
| – | 2002 QX104 | MBA-I | 20.1 | 280 m | single | 9 days | 26 Aug 2002 | 8 | Disc.: NEAT | MPC · JPL |
| 0 | 2002 QT105 | MBA-I | 18.93 | 490 m | multiple | 2002–2021 | 04 Nov 2021 | 46 | Disc.: NEAT | MPC · JPL |
| 2 | 2002 QK106 | MCA | 20.1 | 280 m | multiple | 2002–2012 | 09 Oct 2012 | 26 | Disc.: NEAT | MPC · JPL |
| 0 | 2002 QN106 | MBA-I | 18.5 | 590 m | multiple | 2002–2020 | 15 Dec 2020 | 55 | Disc.: NEAT | MPC · JPL |
| 1 | 2002 QH109 | MCA | 19.8 | 330 m | multiple | 2002–2012 | 26 Aug 2012 | 23 | Disc.: NEAT | MPC · JPL |
| 2 | 2002 QK109 | MBA-I | 18.6 | 570 m | multiple | 2002–2020 | 08 Nov 2020 | 70 | Disc.: NEAT | MPC · JPL |
| 0 | 2002 QM110 | MBA-M | 17.9 | 1.1 km | multiple | 2002–2015 | 02 Nov 2015 | 62 | Disc.: NEAT; Alt.: 2015 OY35 | MPC · JPL |
| 1 | 2002 QN110 | MBA-I | 19.0 | 470 m | multiple | 2002–2019 | 27 May 2019 | 36 | Disc.: NEAT | MPC · JPL |
| 1 | 2002 QT110 | MBA-M | 17.7 | 860 m | multiple | 2002–2021 | 17 Jan 2021 | 40 | Disc.: NEAT | MPC · JPL |
| 1 | 2002 QP111 | MBA-O | 17.55 | 1.8 km | multiple | 2002-2016 | 01 Apr 2016 | 24 | Disc.: NEAT | MPC · JPL |
| 0 | 2002 QD112 | MBA-I | 18.7 | 540 m | multiple | 2002–2019 | 03 Sep 2019 | 28 | Disc.: NEAT | MPC · JPL |
| 0 | 2002 QL112 | MBA-I | 18.8 | 520 m | multiple | 2002–2019 | 20 Dec 2019 | 40 | Disc.: NEAT | MPC · JPL |
| 1 | 2002 QS112 | MBA-M | 18.1 | 710 m | multiple | 2002–2018 | 11 Jul 2018 | 26 | Disc.: NEAT | MPC · JPL |
| 0 | 2002 QT112 | MBA-I | 18.3 | 650 m | multiple | 2002–2020 | 10 Nov 2020 | 35 | Disc.: NEAT | MPC · JPL |
| 0 | 2002 QS113 | MBA-O | 17.8 | 1.5 km | multiple | 2002–2016 | 01 Jul 2016 | 33 | Disc.: NEAT; Alt.: 2011 HQ71 | MPC · JPL |
| 1 | 2002 QV113 | MBA-I | 19.37 | 410 m | multiple | 2002-2024 | 24 Oct 2024 | 47 | Disc.: NEAT | MPC · JPL |
| 1 | 2002 QW113 | MBA-M | 18.35 | 590 m | multiple | 2002-2023 | 14 Dec 2023 | 57 | Disc.: NEAT | MPC · JPL |
| 0 | 2002 QH115 | MBA-I | 18.50 | 590 m | multiple | 2002–2021 | 26 Nov 2021 | 30 | Disc.: NEAT; Alt.: 2006 SS263 | MPC · JPL |
| 0 | 2002 QN116 | MBA-O | 17.5 | 1.8 km | multiple | 2002–2023 | 05 Aug 2023 | 28 | Disc.: NEAT | MPC · JPL |
| 0 | 2002 QU116 | MBA-I | 19.72 | 340 m | multiple | 2002–2021 | 11 Sep 2021 | 37 | Disc.: NEAT; Alt.: 2018 SO20 | MPC · JPL |
| 1 | 2002 QJ117 | MBA-I | 19.1 | 450 m | multiple | 2002–2025 | 02 May 2025 | 46 | Disc.: NEAT | MPC · JPL |
| 0 | 2002 QT117 | MBA-I | 19.0 | 470 m | multiple | 1995–2020 | 15 Oct 2020 | 45 | Disc.: NEAT | MPC · JPL |
| 0 | 2002 QD118 | MBA-I | 18.15 | 390 m | multiple | 2002-2025 | 22 Mar 2025 | 58 | Disc.: NEAT | MPC · JPL |
| – | 2002 QE118 | MBA-M | 19.0 | 470 m | single | 12 days | 30 Aug 2002 | 9 | Disc.: NEAT | MPC · JPL |
| 0 | 2002 QT118 | MBA-M | 18.1 | 710 m | multiple | 2002–2019 | 20 Dec 2019 | 42 | Disc.: NEAT | MPC · JPL |

back to top
