= List of unnumbered minor planets: 2002 G–K =

This is a partial list of unnumbered minor planets for principal provisional designations assigned between 1 April and 31 May 2002. As of March 2026, a total of 120 bodies remain unnumbered for this period. Objects for this year are listed on the following pages: A–B · C · D–F · G–K · L–O · P · Q_{i} · Q_{ii} · R_{i} · R_{ii} · S · T_{i} · T_{ii} · U–V and W–Y. Also see previous and next year.

Near-Earth obj.	MBA (inner)	MBA (outer)	Centaur
Mars-crosser	MBA (middle)	Jupiter trojan	Trans-Neptunian obj.
Unclassified

== G ==
U	Designation	Class	Physical		Observations				Description and notes	Ref
U	Designation	Class	H	D	Opp.	Arc	Last	Used	Description and notes	Ref
3	2002 GQ	ATE	26.3	20 m	single	7 days	08 Apr 2002	20	Disc.: LINEAR	MPC · JPL
5	2002 GR	APO	23.2	81 m	single	48 days	21 May 2002	58	Disc.: LINEAR	MPC · JPL
6	2002 GG1	APO	23.5	71 m	single	96 days	09 Jul 2002	29	Disc.: NEAT; AMO at MPC	MPC · JPL
7	2002 GJ1	APO	23.3	78 m	single	1 day	05 Apr 2002	15	Disc.: AMOS	MPC · JPL
7	2002 GK1	APO	22.5	110 m	single	6 days	10 Apr 2002	46	Disc.: LINEAR	MPC · JPL
1	2002 GB3	MBA-O	17.5	1.8 km	multiple	2002–2019	02 Jul 2019	20	Disc.: NEAT; Added on 22 July 2020	MPC · JPL
–	2002 GA4	MBA-I	18.4	620 m	single	20 days	29 Apr 2002	14	Disc.: NEAT	MPC · JPL
9	2002 GM5	APO	21.5	180 m	single	7 days	17 Apr 2002	22	Disc.: LINEAR; Potentially hazardous object	MPC · JPL
2	2002 GN5	AMO	22.2	130 m	multiple	2002–2004	18 Feb 2004	57	Disc.: LINEAR	MPC · JPL
5	2002 GP5	AMO	20.3	310 m	single	58 days	08 Jun 2002	40	Disc.: NEAT	MPC · JPL
2	2002 GB6	MBA-O	16.8	2.4 km	multiple	2002–2019	25 May 2019	48	Disc.: AMOS; Alt.: 2019 EV3	MPC · JPL
1	2002 GG6	MBA-M	18.02	1 km	multiple	2002-2020	15 Oct 2020	52	Disc.: NEAT	MPC · JPL
5	2002 GF8	AMO	20.6	270 m	single	84 days	02 Jul 2002	63	Disc.: NEAT	MPC · JPL
7	2002 GG8	APO	24.7	41 m	single	21 days	02 May 2002	25	Disc.: LINEAR	MPC · JPL
1	2002 GJ8	AMO	19.4	470 m	multiple	2002–2012	15 Dec 2012	112	Disc.: NEAT	MPC · JPL
0	2002 GL8	MCA	20.10	280 m	multiple	2002–2019	25 Jun 2019	81	Disc.: NEAT	MPC · JPL
1	2002 GR9	MCA	19.3	570 m	multiple	2002-2024	10 Sep 2024	49	Disc.: LINEAR	MPC · JPL
0	2002 GD10	AMO	22.71	100 m	multiple	2002–2021	30 Oct 2021	86	Disc.: LINEAR	MPC · JPL
2	2002 GM18	HUN	19.6	360 m	multiple	2002–2019	04 Nov 2019	24	Disc.: LPL/Spacewatch II	MPC · JPL
1	2002 GM25	MBA-M	17.8	1.2 km	multiple	2002–2015	23 Mar 2015	46	Disc.: Spacewatch; Alt.: 2015 BT35	MPC · JPL
0	2002 GN27	MBA-O	17.76	2.2 km	multiple	2002-2023	25 Feb 2023	31	Disc.: Cerro Tololo	MPC · JPL
1	2002 GW27	MBA-O	17.8	1.5 km	multiple	2002–2019	29 Sep 2019	27	Disc.: Cerro Tololo; Added on 30 September 2021	MPC · JPL
E	2002 GG28	MBA-M	16.4	2.9 km	single	2 days	08 Apr 2002	6	Disc.: Cerro Tololo	MPC · JPL
E	2002 GO28	MBA-O	17.3	1.9 km	single	3 days	09 Apr 2002	8	Disc.: Cerro Tololo	MPC · JPL
0	2002 GR28	HIL	16.81	2.5 km	multiple	2002-2024	30 Dec 2024	39	Disc.: Cerro Tololo; Alt.: 2023 QM41	MPC · JPL
0	2002 GA29	MBA-I	19.0	470 m	multiple	2002–2020	29 Apr 2020	29	Disc.: Cerro Tololo	MPC · JPL
2	2002 GB29	MBA-M	18.5	840 m	multiple	2002–2020	17 Jul 2020	19	Disc.: Cerro Tololo; Added on 9 March 2021	MPC · JPL
E	2002 GG29	JT	14.7	6.4 km	single	2 days	08 Apr 2002	6	Disc.: Cerro Tololo; Greek camp (L4)	MPC · JPL
–	2002 GM29	MBA-O	17.5	1.8 km	single	3 days	09 Apr 2002	8	Disc.: Cerro Tololo	MPC · JPL
E	2002 GP29	MBA-I	18.1	710 m	single	2 days	09 Apr 2002	6	Disc.: Cerro Tololo	MPC · JPL
0	2002 GC30	MBA-I	17.8	820 m	multiple	2002–2021	06 Jan 2021	148	Disc.: Cerro Tololo; Alt.: 2015 BJ259	MPC · JPL
3	2002 GU30	MBA-M	18.2	960 m	multiple	2002–2015	22 Mar 2015	14	Disc.: Cerro Tololo; Added on 21 August 2021	MPC · JPL
0	2002 GW30	MBA-M	17.9	780 m	multiple	2002–2020	17 Sep 2020	42	Disc.: Cerro Tololo; Added on 17 January 2021	MPC · JPL
0	2002 GY30	MBA-I	19.2	430 m	multiple	2002–2020	22 Jun 2020	24	Disc.: Cerro Tololo; Alt.: 2017 OE55	MPC · JPL
0	2002 GD31	MBA-I	18.9	490 m	multiple	2002–2016	27 Aug 2016	47	Disc.: Cerro Tololo	MPC · JPL
0	2002 GM31	MBA-O	17.36	2 km	multiple	2002-2021	04 Oct 2021	41	Disc.: Cerro Tololo; Alt.: 2015 PO122	MPC · JPL
5	2002 GR31	MBA-M	17.97	2.5 km	multiple	2002-2026	17 Mar 2026	10	Disc.: Cerro Tololo	MPC · JPL
4	2002 GW31	TNO	7.12	178 km	multiple	2002–2021	12 May 2021	22	Disc.: Cerro Tololo; LoUTNOs, plutino	MPC · JPL
E	2002 GX31	TNO	7.0	137 km	single	4 days	10 Apr 2002	5	Disc.: Cerro Tololo; LoUTNOs, cubewano?	MPC · JPL
E	2002 GY31	TNO	6.5	172 km	single	4 days	10 Apr 2002	5	Disc.: Cerro Tololo; LoUTNOs, cubewano?	MPC · JPL
3	2002 GA32	TNO	7.7	109 km	multiple	2001–2008	18 May 2008	19	Disc.: Cerro Tololo; LoUTNOs, SDO	MPC · JPL
3	2002 GB32	TNO	7.8	104 km	multiple	2002–2017	17 Jun 2017	30	Disc.: Cerro Tololo; LoUTNOs, SDO, BR-mag: 1.39; taxonomy: IR	MPC · JPL
E	2002 GC32	TNO	7.3	119 km	single	4 days	11 Apr 2002	7	Disc.: Cerro Tololo; LoUTNOs, cubewano?	MPC · JPL
5	2002 GE32	TNO	7.8	130 km	multiple	2002–2018	19 May 2018	16	Disc.: Cerro Tololo; LoUTNOs, plutino Alt.: 2004 NE32	MPC · JPL
4	2002 GH32	TNO	6.26	230 km	multiple	2002–2021	09 Jul 2021	54	Disc.: Cerro Tololo; LoUTNOs, other TNO, albedo: 0.075; BR-mag: 1.56; taxonomy: IR	MPC · JPL
E	2002 GK32	TNO	6.4	180 km	single	1 day	09 Apr 2002	3	Disc.: Cerro Tololo; LoUTNOs, cubewano?	MPC · JPL
3	2002 GL32	TNO	7.6	143 km	multiple	2002–2013	13 Mar 2013	15	Disc.: Cerro Tololo; LoUTNOs, plutino	MPC · JPL
E	2002 GM32	TNO	9.0	75 km	single	4 days	10 Apr 2002	5	Disc.: Cerro Tololo; LoUTNOs, plutino?	MPC · JPL
E	2002 GN32	TNO	6.3	260 km	single	66 days	11 Jun 2002	8	Disc.: Cerro Tololo; LoUTNOs, plutino?	MPC · JPL
E	2002 GO32	TNO	7.6	143 km	single	1 day	07 Apr 2002	3	Disc.: Cerro Tololo; LoUTNOs, plutino?	MPC · JPL
E	2002 GQ32	TNO	7.7	136 km	single	4 days	11 Apr 2002	5	Disc.: Cerro Tololo; LoUTNOs, plutino?	MPC · JPL
4	2002 GR32	TNO	8.6	90 km	multiple	2002–2017	02 May 2017	16	Disc.: Cerro Tololo; LoUTNOs, plutino	MPC · JPL
2	2002 GS32	TNO	7.6	104 km	multiple	2002–2014	30 May 2014	21	Disc.: Cerro Tololo; LoUTNOs, cubewano?, BR-mag: 1.76; taxonomy: RR	MPC · JPL
E	2002 GT32	TNO	8.1	113 km	single	1 day	09 Apr 2002	4	Disc.: Cerro Tololo; LoUTNOs, plutino?	MPC · JPL
E	2002 GU32	TNO	6.9	197 km	single	70 days	17 Jun 2002	5	Disc.: Cerro Tololo; LoUTNOs, plutino?	MPC · JPL
3	2002 GW32	TNO	7.5	114 km	multiple	2002–2016	29 May 2016	18	Disc.: Cerro Tololo; LoUTNOs, res · 4:5	MPC · JPL
E	2002 GA33	TNO	8.6	65 km	single	1 day	08 Apr 2002	3	Disc.: Mauna Kea Obs. LoUTNOs, cubewano?	MPC · JPL
E	2002 GB33	TNO	7.8	95 km	single	1 day	08 Apr 2002	3	Disc.: Mauna Kea Obs. LoUTNOs, cubewano?	MPC · JPL
0	2002 GD90	MBA-M	18.0	1.1 km	multiple	2002–2019	04 Jan 2019	28	Disc.: LPL/Spacewatch II	MPC · JPL
1	2002 GB150	MBA-M	17.7	860 m	multiple	2002–2018	25 Jan 2018	31	Disc.: LINEAR; Alt.: 2010 KM136	MPC · JPL
3	2002 GH166	TNO	7.3	164 km	multiple	2000–2018	13 Apr 2018	89	Disc.: Cerro Tololo; LoUTNOs, plutino	MPC · JPL
E	2002 GJ166	TNO	7.9	124 km	single	29 days	08 May 2002	4	Disc.: Cerro Tololo; LoUTNOs, plutino?	MPC · JPL
0	2002 GM178	HUN	19.0	470 m	multiple	2002–2021	06 Mar 2021	30	Disc.: Astrovirtel; Added on 17 June 2021; Alt.: 2021 AA19	MPC · JPL
0	2002 GX180	MBA-O	17.6	1.7 km	multiple	2002–2018	18 Mar 2018	41	Disc.: NEAT	MPC · JPL
–	2002 GK183	MBA-I	19.8	330 m	single	5 days	09 Apr 2002	8	Disc.: LPL/Spacewatch II	MPC · JPL
0	2002 GG185	MBA-I	18.57	570 m	multiple	2002–2021	02 Dec 2021	48	Disc.: NEAT; Alt.: 2009 JX7	MPC · JPL
0	2002 GO185	MBA-I	18.57	570 m	multiple	2002–2021	06 Oct 2021	49	Disc.: NEAT; Alt.: 2020 GB19	MPC · JPL
0	2002 GN187	MBA-I	18.4	620 m	multiple	2002–2017	05 May 2017	35	Disc.: NEAT; Alt.: 2013 EJ179	MPC · JPL
1	2002 GY189	MBA-I	18.7	540 m	multiple	2002–2016	03 Apr 2016	40	Disc.: NEAT	MPC · JPL
0	2002 GL195	MCA	18.4	620 m	multiple	2002–2019	02 Jun 2019	40	Disc.: Cerro Tololo	MPC · JPL
1	2002 GN195	MBA-M	17.9	780 m	multiple	2002–2020	11 Jul 2020	47	Disc.: Cerro Tololo	MPC · JPL
0	2002 GT195	HUN	18.56	580 m	multiple	2002–2021	30 Aug 2021	30	Disc.: NEAT	MPC · JPL
0	2002 GJ196	MBA-M	18.2	960 m	multiple	2002–2019	03 Jun 2019	52	Disc.: NEAT	MPC · JPL
0	2002 GN196	MBA-I	18.6	570 m	multiple	2002–2019	30 Nov 2019	62	Disc.: Cerro Tololo	MPC · JPL
0	2002 GT196	MBA-I	18.5	590 m	multiple	2002–2018	10 Jul 2018	36	Disc.: Cerro Tololo	MPC · JPL
1	2002 GU196	MBA-I	18.4	620 m	multiple	2002–2019	27 Oct 2019	39	Disc.: Spacewatch	MPC · JPL
1	2002 GY196	MBA-O	16.50	2.8 km	multiple	2002–2021	04 Nov 2021	37	Disc.: Cerro Tololo	MPC · JPL
0	2002 GA197	MBA-M	17.78	1.2 km	multiple	2002–2021	26 Oct 2021	45	Disc.: NEAT	MPC · JPL
0	2002 GO197	MBA-I	19.0	470 m	multiple	2002–2020	14 Feb 2020	50	Disc.: Cerro Tololo	MPC · JPL
0	2002 GS197	MBA-M	18.13	990 m	multiple	1995–2021	31 Aug 2021	50	Disc.: Cerro Tololo	MPC · JPL
0	2002 GA198	MBA-M	17.7	1.2 km	multiple	2002–2020	17 Sep 2020	28	Disc.: Cerro Tololo; Added on 17 January 2021	MPC · JPL

back to top

== H ==
U	Designation	Class	Physical		Observations				Description and notes	Ref
U	Designation	Class	H	D	Opp.	Arc	Last	Used	Description and notes	Ref
5	2002 HF	MCA	19.3	770 m	single	75 days	30 Jun 2002	46	Disc.: LINEAR	MPC · JPL
0	2002 HM5	MBA-M	17.7	1.2 km	multiple	2002–2020	11 Sep 2020	123	Disc.: LINEAR; Alt.: 2015 CX46	MPC · JPL
0	2002 HE8	AMO	20.5	280 m	multiple	2002–2014	25 Nov 2014	79	Disc.: LONEOS	MPC · JPL
1	2002 HP11	APO	20.5	280 m	multiple	2002-2022	24 Aug 2022	79	Disc.: LINEAR; Potentially hazardous object	MPC · JPL
0	2002 HT11	MCA	17.91	1.1 km	multiple	2002–2023	11 Apr 2023	108	Disc.: LINEAR	MPC · JPL
–	2002 HT18	MBA-M	17.9	780 m	single	22 days	13 May 2002	11	Disc.: NEAT	MPC · JPL
0	2002 HH19	MBA-M	18.0	1.1 km	multiple	2002–2020	14 Sep 2020	38	Disc.: LPL/Spacewatch II	MPC · JPL

back to top

== J ==
U	Designation	Class	Physical		Observations				Description and notes	Ref
U	Designation	Class	H	D	Opp.	Arc	Last	Used	Description and notes	Ref
0	2002 JB3	MBA-M	18.4	620 m	multiple	2002–2019	02 Sep 2019	54	Disc.: LPL/Spacewatch II; Added on 22 July 2020	MPC · JPL
1	2002 JZ8	APO	21.0	220 m	multiple	2002–2019	29 Nov 2019	163	Disc.: LINEAR; Potentially hazardous object	MPC · JPL
2	2002 JD9	APO	23.2	81 m	multiple	2002–2019	05 Feb 2019	80	Disc.: LINEAR	MPC · JPL
0	2002 JQ9	APO	19.24	500 m	multiple	2002–2021	09 Sep 2021	188	Disc.: LINEAR; Potentially hazardous object	MPC · JPL
4	2002 JU15	APO	26.2	20 m	single	12 days	20 May 2002	25	Disc.: LINEAR	MPC · JPL
0	2002 JO16	MCA	18.1	1.0 km	multiple	2002–2015	18 May 2015	61	Disc.: LINEAR	MPC · JPL
0	2002 JS67	MBA-I	18.09	720 m	multiple	2002–2020	13 Oct 2020	94	Disc.: LINEAR	MPC · JPL
0	2002 JP97	MCA	18.41	620 m	multiple	2002–2021	02 Dec 2021	74	Disc.: LINEAR; Alt.: 2018 VN8	MPC · JPL
0	2002 JQ97	AMO	22.9	93 m	multiple	2002–2005	05 Jul 2005	110	Disc.: NEAT	MPC · JPL
0	2002 JF100	MBA-M	18.7	760 m	multiple	2002–2020	13 Sep 2020	60	Disc.: Tenagra II Obs.	MPC · JPL
0	2002 JR100	ATE	24.35	28 m	multiple	2002–2026	24 May 2026	158	Disc.: NEAT	MPC · JPL
0	2002 JT107	MBA-M	17.9	1.1 km	multiple	2002–2019	26 Feb 2019	52	Disc.: Tenagra II Obs.	MPC · JPL
1	2002 JC108	MCA	17.72	2.2 km	multiple	2002-2023	14 Oct 2023	52	Disc.: NEAT	MPC · JPL
0	2002 JC109	MCA	18.77	740 m	multiple	2002–2019	29 Jun 2019	59	Disc.: LINEAR	MPC · JPL
0	2002 JE109	Asteroid	18.8	970 m	multiple	2002–2020	25 May 2020	72	Disc.: LINEAR; MCA at MPC; Alt.: 2020 FU7	MPC · JPL
–	2002 JG148	MBA-I	17.1	1.1 km	single	20 days	02 May 2002	9	Disc.: AMOS	MPC · JPL
1	2002 JZ149	MBA-M	18.79	920 m	multiple	2002–2024	01 May 2024	58	Disc.: NEAT; Alt.: 2015 AQ262	MPC · JPL
0	2002 JP152	MBA-M	17.7	1.2 km	multiple	2002–2019	03 Mar 2019	35	Disc.: SDSS	MPC · JPL
0	2002 JK153	MCA	19.1	450 m	multiple	2002–2019	02 Oct 2019	38	Disc.: LPL/Spacewatch II	MPC · JPL
3	2002 JP153	MBA-O	17.6	1.7 km	multiple	2002–2017	17 Mar 2017	29	Disc.: LPL/Spacewatch II	MPC · JPL
0	2002 JU153	MBA-I	18.6	570 m	multiple	2002–2020	16 May 2020	51	Disc.: LPL/Spacewatch II	MPC · JPL
0	2002 JV153	MBA-M	17.5	940 m	multiple	2002–2018	18 Feb 2018	30	Disc.: SDSS	MPC · JPL

back to top

== K ==
U	Designation	Class	Physical		Observations				Description and notes	Ref
U	Designation	Class	H	D	Opp.	Arc	Last	Used	Description and notes	Ref
1	2002 KM3	APO	22.3	120 m	multiple	2002–2019	24 Dec 2019	104	Disc.: LPL/Spacewatch II	MPC · JPL
1	2002 KN3	MCA	19.17	400 m	multiple	2002-2022	01 Jun 2022	61	Disc.: LINEAR; Alt.: 2012 JM11, 2022 KT2	MPC · JPL
5	2002 KG4	APO	20.9	230 m	single	31 days	22 Jun 2002	182	Disc.: LINEAR; Potentially hazardous object	MPC · JPL
5	2002 KJ8	Asteroid	20.2	510 m	single	48 days	05 Jul 2002	29	Disc.: NEAT; MCA at MPC	MPC · JPL
0	2002 KK8	AMO	21.0	220 m	multiple	2002–2013	08 May 2013	108	Disc.: LINEAR; Potentially hazardous object	MPC · JPL
1	2002 KV15	MBA-M	18.27	850 m	multiple	2002-2023	16 Mar 2023	32	Disc.: NEAT; Alt.: 2019 JU122	MPC · JPL
1	2002 KD17	MBA-O	16.8	2.4 km	multiple	2002–2014	31 May 2014	27	Disc.: AMOS; Alt.: 2014 KY84	MPC · JPL

back to top
