= List of unnumbered minor planets: 2002 S =

This is a partial list of unnumbered minor planets for principal provisional designations assigned during 16–30 September 2002. As of March 2026, a total of 49 bodies remain unnumbered for this period. Objects for this year are listed on the following pages: A–B · C · D–F · G–K · L–O · P · Q_{i} · Q_{ii} · R_{i} · R_{ii} · S · T_{i} · T_{ii} · U–V and W–Y. Also see previous and next year.

Near-Earth obj.	MBA (inner)	MBA (outer)	Centaur
Mars-crosser	MBA (middle)	Jupiter trojan	Trans-Neptunian obj.
Unclassified

== S ==
U	Designation	Class	Physical		Observations				Description and notes	Ref
U	Designation	Class	H	D	Opp.	Arc	Last	Used	Description and notes	Ref
5	2002 SF	AMO	20.2	320 m	single	39 days	25 Oct 2002	35	Disc.: AMOS	MPC · JPL
0	2002 SN	AMO	21.04	220 m	multiple	2002–2021	01 Nov 2021	92	Disc.: NEAT	MPC · JPL
1	2002 SG3	MCA	19.4	550 m	multiple	2002–2015	09 Dec 2015	37	Disc.: NEAT; Alt.: 2015 OL109	MPC · JPL
0	2002 SW8	MBA-I	18.4	620 m	multiple	2002–2020	17 Nov 2020	75	Disc.: NEAT; Alt.: 2009 QB42	MPC · JPL
0	2002 SM17	MBA-M	18.4	880 m	multiple	2002–2019	21 Oct 2019	36	Disc.: NEAT	MPC · JPL
1	2002 SK19	MBA-M	18.32	1.2 km	multiple	2002-2022	03 Mar 2022	66	Disc.: NEAT	MPC · JPL
0	2002 SW26	MBA-M	18.58	590 m	multiple	2002-2024	18 Jan 2024	56	Disc.: AMOS	MPC · JPL
0	2002 SF28	MBA-I	18.4	620 m	multiple	2002–2020	22 Jun 2020	63	Disc.: Ondřejov Obs. Alt.: 2006 XG61, 2013 PZ28	MPC · JPL
0	2002 SV28	MCA	18.2	960 m	multiple	2001–2019	25 May 2019	60	Disc.: AMOS	MPC · JPL
1	2002 SP29	MBA-M	19.15	620 m	multiple	2002–2019	28 Nov 2019	44	Disc.: NEAT; Alt.: 2019 TV21	MPC · JPL
0	2002 SC35	MBA-M	18.1	1.3 km	multiple	2002–2021	06 Jan 2021	211	Disc.: AMOS	MPC · JPL
0	2002 SN39	MBA-I	18.3	650 m	multiple	2002–2019	24 Oct 2019	57	Disc.: LINEAR	MPC · JPL
0	2002 SQ41	APO	20.27	320 m	multiple	2002-2023	10 Sep 2023	90	Disc.: AMOS; Potentially hazardous object	MPC · JPL
0	2002 SJ63	MBA-I	18.2	680 m	multiple	2002–2021	06 Jan 2021	81	Disc.: NEAT	MPC · JPL
3	2002 SU63	MBA-M	18.0	1.4 km	multiple	2002–2016	02 Nov 2016	25	Disc.: NEAT	MPC · JPL
0	2002 SK64	MBA-M	18.3	920 m	multiple	2002–2019	28 Nov 2019	42	Disc.: NEAT	MPC · JPL
0	2002 SD65	MBA-M	18.9	700 m	multiple	2002–2019	30 Nov 2019	46	Disc.: NEAT	MPC · JPL
0	2002 SG65	MCA	19.57	360 m	multiple	2002–2019	24 Aug 2019	32	Disc.: NEAT	MPC · JPL
1	2002 SM65	MBA-M	18.1	710 m	multiple	2002–2014	21 Jun 2014	47	Disc.: NEAT; Alt.: 2006 OG3	MPC · JPL
0	2002 ST65	MBA-I	19.3	410 m	multiple	2002–2020	29 Jun 2020	27	Disc.: NEAT; Alt.: 2013 SA99	MPC · JPL
0	2002 SK66	MBA-I	18.6	570 m	multiple	2002–2019	05 Oct 2019	39	Disc.: NEAT	MPC · JPL
0	2002 SR67	MBA-O	17.2	2.0 km	multiple	2002–2018	11 Oct 2018	37	Disc.: NEAT	MPC · JPL
0	2002 SG68	MBA-O	18.1	1.8 km	multiple	2002-2024	08 Jun 2024	44	Disc.: NEAT	MPC · JPL
–	2002 SH68	MBA-I	19.5	370 m	single	8 days	04 Oct 2002	10	Disc.: NEAT	MPC · JPL
2	2002 SO68	MCA	19.82	300 m	multiple	2002-2014	22 Aug 2014	18	Disc.: NEAT	MPC · JPL
–	2002 SU68	MBA-M	19.5	370 m	single	2 days	28 Sep 2002	6	Disc.: NEAT	MPC · JPL
0	2002 SW68	MBA-I	19.2	430 m	multiple	2002–2020	17 Oct 2020	46	Disc.: NEAT	MPC · JPL
1	2002 SM69	MBA-I	19.1	450 m	multiple	2002–2019	30 Jun 2019	48	Disc.: NEAT; Alt.: 2009 RM72	MPC · JPL
2	2002 SV69	MBA-M	18.4	620 m	multiple	2002–2006	30 Sep 2006	19	Disc.: NEAT	MPC · JPL
0	2002 SH70	MBA-I	19.3	410 m	multiple	2002–2020	14 Nov 2020	71	Disc.: NEAT; Alt.: 2013 WF94	MPC · JPL
0	2002 SG72	MBA-O	16.32	3.0 km	multiple	2002–2021	17 Apr 2021	155	Disc.: NEAT; Alt.: 2008 SV206	MPC · JPL
0	2002 SM72	MBA-O	17.0	2.2 km	multiple	2002–2021	07 Feb 2021	39	Disc.: NEAT; Alt.: 2019 SD152	MPC · JPL
3	2002 SP72	MBA-M	18.8	730 m	multiple	2002–2015	23 Sep 2015	23	Disc.: NEAT	MPC · JPL
1	2002 SZ72	MBA-I	18.1	710 m	multiple	2002–2018	28 Dec 2018	74	Disc.: NEAT; Alt.: 2014 WX16	MPC · JPL
0	2002 SF73	MBA-I	18.5	590 m	multiple	2002–2021	16 Jan 2021	80	Disc.: NEAT	MPC · JPL
0	2002 SK73	MBA-I	18.7	540 m	multiple	2002–2019	17 Nov 2019	51	Disc.: NEAT	MPC · JPL
0	2002 SM73	MBA-I	18.4	620 m	multiple	2002–2019	24 Sep 2019	37	Disc.: NEAT	MPC · JPL
0	2002 SN73	MBA-M	18.6	800 m	multiple	2002–2019	19 Nov 2019	37	Disc.: NEAT	MPC · JPL
0	2002 SS73	MBA-M	18.40	880 m	multiple	2002–2019	29 Jun 2019	58	Disc.: NEAT; Alt.: 2015 PY7	MPC · JPL
0	2002 SV73	MBA-O	17.5	1.8 km	multiple	2002–2018	17 Nov 2018	33	Disc.: NEAT; Alt.: 2018 VY99	MPC · JPL
0	2002 SZ73	MBA-O	17.4	1.8 km	multiple	2002–2020	23 Dec 2020	45	Disc.: NEAT; Alt.: 2013 RA10	MPC · JPL
0	2002 SF74	MBA-M	18.1	1.0 km	multiple	2002–2019	01 Nov 2019	45	Disc.: NEAT	MPC · JPL
0	2002 SK74	HIL	16.83	2.3 km	multiple	2002-2025	17 Aug 2025	53	Disc.: AMOS	MPC · JPL
0	2002 SC75	MBA-M	18.3	650 m	multiple	2002–2019	31 Dec 2019	50	Disc.: NEAT	MPC · JPL
0	2002 SH75	MBA-M	17.6	1.3 km	multiple	2002–2021	12 Jan 2021	95	Disc.: NEAT; Alt.: 2015 TV243	MPC · JPL
0	2002 SJ75	MBA-O	17.27	2.2 km	multiple	2002-2024	02 Nov 2024	32	Disc.: NEAT	MPC · JPL
1	2002 SL75	MBA-I	18.82	520 m	multiple	2002-2022	17 Nov 2022	12	Disc.: NEAT; Alt.: 2016 SV102	MPC · JPL
0	2002 SM75	MBA-M	18.3	920 m	multiple	2002–2015	02 Nov 2015	27	Disc.: NEAT	MPC · JPL

back to top
