= List of unnumbered minor planets: 2002 R (0–262) =

This is a partial list of unnumbered minor planets for principal provisional designations assigned during 1–15 September 2002. Since this period yielded a high number of provisional discoveries, it is further split into several standalone pages. As of March 2026, a total of 120 bodies remain unnumbered for this period. Objects for this year are listed on the following pages: A–B · C · D–F · G–K · L–O · P · Q_{i} · Q_{ii} · R_{i} · R_{ii} · S · T_{i} · T_{ii} · U–V and W–Y. Also see previous and next year.

Near-Earth obj.	MBA (inner)	MBA (outer)	Centaur
Mars-crosser	MBA (middle)	Jupiter trojan	Trans-Neptunian obj.
Unclassified

== R ==
U	Designation	Class	Physical		Observations				Description and notes	Ref
U	Designation	Class	H	D	Opp.	Arc	Last	Used	Description and notes	Ref
0	2002 RB	AMO	20.8	250 m	multiple	2002–2015	15 Oct 2015	109	Disc.: NEAT	MPC · JPL
1	2002 RT	APO	20.9	230 m	multiple	2002–2013	02 Sep 2013	70	Disc.: NEAT	MPC · JPL
5	2002 RU	MCA	19.2	430 m	single	80 days	22 Nov 2002	37	Disc.: NEAT	MPC · JPL
2	2002 RV	MCA	18.7	540 m	multiple	2001–2017	08 Oct 2017	47	Disc.: NEAT	MPC · JPL
2	2002 RO1	MBA-M	18.3	920 m	multiple	2002–2015	23 Sep 2015	45	Disc.: NEAT; Alt.: 2015 RU85	MPC · JPL
1	2002 RX6	MBA-M	17.4	1.4 km	multiple	2002–2021	16 Jan 2021	149	Disc.: AMOS	MPC · JPL
5	2002 RS25	Asteroid	19.5	700 m	single	47 days	06 Oct 2002	40	Disc.: LONEOS; MCA at MPC	MPC · JPL
–	2002 RZ26	MCA	18.7	540 m	single	46 days	05 Oct 2002	31	Disc.: LINEAR	MPC · JPL
1	2002 RL28	MBA-M	18.1	710 m	multiple	2002–2020	02 Feb 2020	38	Disc.: LONEOS	MPC · JPL
6	2002 RO28	APO	25.4	30 m	single	90 days	04 Dec 2002	22	Disc.: LINEAR; AMO at MPC	MPC · JPL
5	2002 RQ28	Asteroid	18.5	1.1 km	single	42 days	02 Oct 2002	42	Disc.: LINEAR; MCA at MPC	MPC · JPL
0	2002 RC36	MBA-M	17.6	900 m	multiple	2002–2014	09 Jul 2014	43	Disc.: LONEOS; Alt.: 2006 QR21	MPC · JPL
0	2002 RG66	MCA	19.62	350 m	multiple	2002–2022	06 Jan 2022	80	Disc.: LINEAR	MPC · JPL
–	2002 RS74	MBA-M	17.4	980 m	single	37 days	26 Sep 2002	25	Disc.: LINEAR	MPC · JPL
0	2002 RL77	MBA-I	18.5	590 m	multiple	2002–2019	27 Oct 2019	80	Disc.: LINEAR	MPC · JPL
0	2002 RV78	MBA-I	18.5	590 m	multiple	2002–2020	15 Dec 2020	81	Disc.: LINEAR	MPC · JPL
1	2002 RB85	MBA-M	18.1	710 m	multiple	2002–2014	27 Jun 2014	34	Disc.: LINEAR; Alt.: 2006 QB14	MPC · JPL
–	2002 RN109	TNO	15.3	5.0 km	single	80 days	04 Nov 2002	38	Disc.: LINEAR; LoUTNOs, damocloid	MPC · JPL
0	2002 RD111	MBA-I	18.2	680 m	multiple	2002–2019	20 Dec 2019	90	Disc.: LINEAR; Alt.: 2015 JQ5	MPC · JPL
0	2002 RF112	MCA	18.5	590 m	multiple	2002–2020	11 Dec 2020	58	Disc.: LINEAR	MPC · JPL
5	2002 RC117	APO	24.9	37 m	single	15 days	10 Sep 2002	48	Disc.: LINEAR	MPC · JPL
0	2002 RU117	MBA-M	18.02	750 m	multiple	2002–2023	26 Aug 2023	70	Disc.: Kvistaberg Obs.	MPC · JPL
0	2002 RS124	MCA	18.7	540 m	multiple	2002–2019	19 Dec 2019	59	Disc.: NEAT	MPC · JPL
2	2002 RG125	MBA-M	18.3	1.2 km	multiple	2002–2020	20 Sep 2020	80	Disc.: NEAT	MPC · JPL
0	2002 RK125	MBA-M	18.24	900 m	multiple	2002-2023	14 Dec 2023	49	Disc.: NEAT	MPC · JPL
2	2002 RZ125	APO	20.35	390 m	multiple	2002-2024	12 Sep 2024	45	Disc.: NEAT	MPC · JPL
6	2002 RA126	APO	22.8	98 m	single	17 days	28 Sep 2002	27	Disc.: NEAT; AMO at MPC	MPC · JPL
0	2002 RU127	MBA-M	17.3	1.0 km	multiple	2002–2020	23 Dec 2020	44	Disc.: NEAT	MPC · JPL
0	2002 RQ129	MBA-M	17.6	900 m	multiple	2002–2014	28 Jun 2014	45	Disc.: AMOS	MPC · JPL
8	2002 RR129	Asteroid	22.4	180 m	single	16 days	13 Sep 2002	24	Disc.: NEAT; MCA at MPC	MPC · JPL
0	2002 RS129	APO	22.85	96 m	multiple	2002–2021	18 Jan 2021	63	Disc.: NEAT	MPC · JPL
0	2002 RT129	APO	19.67	410 m	multiple	2002–2022	08 Jan 2022	185	Disc.: NEAT	MPC · JPL
0	2002 RV129	MBA-O	15.85	3.8 km	multiple	2002–2021	02 Apr 2021	305	Disc.: NEAT	MPC · JPL
2	2002 RZ129	MBA-O	16.9	2.3 km	multiple	2002–2019	29 Nov 2019	79	Disc.: NEAT; Alt.: 2019 QN15	MPC · JPL
0	2002 RO137	AMO	20.50	280 m	multiple	2002–2021	04 Dec 2021	344	Disc.: AMOS	MPC · JPL
2	2002 RP137	AMO	23.0	89 m	multiple	2002–2017	24 Sep 2017	53	Disc.: NEAT	MPC · JPL
1	2002 RS137	MBA-I	19.0	470 m	multiple	2002–2019	30 May 2019	45	Disc.: NEAT	MPC · JPL
–	2002 RT137	MBA-I	18.2	680 m	single	3 days	15 Sep 2002	9	Disc.: NEAT	MPC · JPL
0	2002 RP142	MBA-I	18.9	490 m	multiple	2002–2017	27 Jan 2017	33	Disc.: NEAT; Alt.: 2012 SY43	MPC · JPL
0	2002 RO144	MBA-I	18.3	650 m	multiple	2002–2020	27 Feb 2020	173	Disc.: NEAT	MPC · JPL
1	2002 RY144	MBA-I	19.4	390 m	multiple	2002–2018	11 Jul 2018	50	Disc.: NEAT; Alt.: 2015 TU192	MPC · JPL
0	2002 RL146	MBA-I	19.28	410 m	multiple	2002–2021	05 Nov 2021	199	Disc.: NEAT; Alt.: 2002 UE63	MPC · JPL
0	2002 RY147	MBA-M	17.6	900 m	multiple	2002–2019	02 Dec 2019	47	Disc.: NEAT	MPC · JPL
1	2002 RO150	MCA	18.3	650 m	multiple	2002–2020	01 Feb 2020	48	Disc.: AMOS	MPC · JPL
2	2002 RX153	MBA-M	18.42	620 m	multiple	2002-2024	01 Jan 2024	34	Disc.: LPL/Spacewatch II	MPC · JPL
1	2002 RK162	MBA-O	17.1	2.1 km	multiple	2002–2018	10 Oct 2018	77	Disc.: NEAT; Alt.: 2017 FM19	MPC · JPL
0	2002 RN163	MBA-I	19.0	470 m	multiple	2002–2020	20 Oct 2020	81	Disc.: NEAT	MPC · JPL
0	2002 RC164	MBA-I	19.0	470 m	multiple	2002–2019	05 Oct 2019	70	Disc.: NEAT; Alt.: 2009 UU93	MPC · JPL
0	2002 RB165	MBA-M	18.5	840 m	multiple	2002–2015	03 Nov 2015	109	Disc.: NEAT; Alt.: 2015 RS95	MPC · JPL
1	2002 RM166	MBA-M	18.1	710 m	multiple	1998–2014	15 Aug 2014	40	Disc.: NEAT	MPC · JPL
–	2002 RS167	MBA-M	19.3	410 m	single	17 days	16 Sep 2002	12	Disc.: NEAT	MPC · JPL
0	2002 RT167	MBA-M	18.5	840 m	multiple	2002–2020	13 Nov 2020	34	Disc.: NEAT; Alt.: 2019 JP40	MPC · JPL
0	2002 RC177	MBA-M	17.8	820 m	multiple	2002–2021	09 Apr 2021	27	Disc.: NEAT; Alt.: 2002 TU380, 2002 TR354, 2006 QN105	MPC · JPL
1	2002 RX180	MCA	19.5	370 m	multiple	2002–2016	25 Sep 2016	63	Disc.: NEAT; Alt.: 2009 QB34	MPC · JPL
0	2002 RB181	HUN	19.59	360 m	multiple	2002–2021	16 Apr 2021	26	Disc.: NEAT; Added on 9 March 2021; Alt.: 2016 GH216	MPC · JPL
3	2002 RK181	MCA	18.6	1.5 km	multiple	2002-2018	09 Feb 2018	41	Disc.: NEAT	MPC · JPL
0	2002 RO181	HUN	19.1	450 m	multiple	2002–2019	09 Apr 2019	51	Disc.: NEAT; Alt.: 2019 GA3	MPC · JPL
0	2002 RY181	MCA	20.68	410 m	multiple	2002–2021	30 Nov 2021	76	Disc.: NEAT	MPC · JPL
0	2002 RZ181	MBA-O	16.3	3.1 km	multiple	2002–2021	11 Jan 2021	105	Disc.: Michael Adrian Obs. Alt.: 2014 WD502	MPC · JPL
0	2002 RA182	AMO	20.76	250 m	multiple	2002–2021	02 Oct 2021	87	Disc.: NEAT	MPC · JPL
7	2002 RB182	APO	23.1	85 m	single	2 days	16 Sep 2002	16	Disc.: NEAT	MPC · JPL
3	2002 RK208	MBA-I	18.9	490 m	multiple	2002–2020	15 Sep 2020	42	Disc.: NEAT; Alt.: 2013 TY205	MPC · JPL
0	2002 RS209	MBA-O	17.4	1.8 km	multiple	2002–2019	28 Dec 2019	45	Disc.: LPL/Spacewatch II	MPC · JPL
1	2002 RT209	MBA-M	19.51	580 m	multiple	2002-2011	30 Oct 2011	31	Disc.: LPL/Spacewatch II; Alt.: 2011 UC395	MPC · JPL
0	2002 RZ209	MBA-M	18.38	1.2 km	multiple	2002–2021	06 Nov 2021	65	Disc.: LPL/Spacewatch II	MPC · JPL
1	2002 RC210	MBA-I	18.9	490 m	multiple	2002–2020	22 Aug 2020	50	Disc.: LPL/Spacewatch II	MPC · JPL
0	2002 RD210	MBA-I	19.4	390 m	multiple	2002–2020	15 Oct 2020	49	Disc.: LPL/Spacewatch II; Alt.: 2013 UJ40	MPC · JPL
0	2002 RY210	MBA-O	17.3	1.9 km	multiple	2002–2019	27 Nov 2019	64	Disc.: LPL/Spacewatch II	MPC · JPL
0	2002 RY217	MBA-I	18.6	570 m	multiple	2002–2020	05 Nov 2020	56	Disc.: NEAT	MPC · JPL
0	2002 RJ225	MBA-M	17.0	1.2 km	multiple	1996–2021	01 Jun 2021	47	Disc.: NEAT; Alt.: 2010 KK53	MPC · JPL
1	2002 RS229	MBA-I	18.8	520 m	multiple	2002–2019	27 Oct 2019	49	Disc.: AMOS	MPC · JPL
1	2002 RN232	HIL	16.7	2.5 km	multiple	2002–2018	05 Oct 2018	51	Disc.: NEAT; Alt.: 2010 SA11	MPC · JPL
1	2002 RT232	MBA-I	19.45	390 m	multiple	2002-2022	14 Nov 2022	64	Disc.: NEAT; Alt.: 2002 SX61	MPC · JPL
–	2002 RP234	MCA	18.7	540 m	single	26 days	15 Sep 2002	16	Disc.: NEAT	MPC · JPL
0	2002 RJ235	MBA-M	17.6	1.7 km	multiple	2002–2021	08 Nov 2021	68	Disc.: NEAT; Added on 5 November 2021; Alt.: 2016 PY225	MPC · JPL
0	2002 RD236	MBA-M	17.5	1.3 km	multiple	2002–2021	14 Jan 2021	68	Disc.: NEAT	MPC · JPL
0	2002 RH236	MBA-I	18.9	490 m	multiple	2002–2018	15 Sep 2018	69	Disc.: NEAT	MPC · JPL
0	2002 RS236	MBA-M	18.4	880 m	multiple	2002–2019	25 Sep 2019	41	Disc.: NEAT	MPC · JPL
1	2002 RY236	MBA-M	18.0	1.1 km	multiple	1998–2019	03 Oct 2019	51	Disc.: NEAT; Alt.: 2015 TV258	MPC · JPL
–	2002 RB238	MBA-M	19.2	800 m	single	19 days	16 Sep 2002	14	Disc.: NEAT	MPC · JPL
2	2002 RM238	MBA-I	18.4	620 m	multiple	2002–2018	15 Dec 2018	44	Disc.: NEAT; Alt.: 2006 US323	MPC · JPL
2	2002 RL241	MBA-M	18.2	680 m	multiple	2002–2019	28 Nov 2019	24	Disc.: NEAT	MPC · JPL
0	2002 RV241	MBA-M	18.6	800 m	multiple	2002–2019	05 Nov 2019	50	Disc.: NEAT	MPC · JPL
2	2002 RX243	MBA-M	18.5	590 m	multiple	2002–2018	12 Jul 2018	25	Disc.: NEAT	MPC · JPL
0	2002 RD244	MCA	19.1	450 m	multiple	2002–2015	02 Nov 2015	70	Disc.: NEAT; Alt.: 2015 OO39	MPC · JPL
0	2002 RK244	MBA-M	18.2	680 m	multiple	2002–2019	19 Nov 2019	37	Disc.: NEAT	MPC · JPL
0	2002 RM244	MBA-M	18.3	920 m	multiple	2002–2019	04 Nov 2019	78	Disc.: NEAT	MPC · JPL
0	2002 RM245	MBA-M	18.2	960 m	multiple	2002–2015	24 Jun 2015	27	Disc.: NEAT	MPC · JPL
0	2002 RR245	MCA	19.41	390 m	multiple	2002–2019	24 Oct 2019	61	Disc.: NEAT	MPC · JPL
0	2002 RT245	MBA-M	18.1	1.0 km	multiple	2002–2019	25 Oct 2019	72	Disc.: NEAT; Alt.: 2015 TN289	MPC · JPL
0	2002 RX245	MBA-O	18.86	920 m	multiple	2002-2022	27 Sep 2022	55	Disc.: NEAT	MPC · JPL
–	2002 RH248	MCA	20.3	260 m	single	18 days	16 Sep 2002	10	Disc.: NEAT	MPC · JPL
–	2002 RA250	MBA-M	18.8	520 m	single	21 days	18 Sep 2002	9	Disc.: NEAT	MPC · JPL
3	2002 RF250	MBA-I	18.87	450 m	nultiple	2002-2025	14 Jul 2025	19	Disc.: NEAT	MPC · JPL
1	2002 RL251	MBA-M	18.0	1.7 km	multiple	2002-2024	22 Nov 2024	39	Disc.: NEAT	MPC · JPL
0	2002 RQ251	MBA-I	18.4	620 m	multiple	2002–2020	22 Sep 2020	48	Disc.: NEAT; Added on 17 January 2021	MPC · JPL
2	2002 RS251	MBA-M	19.1	450 m	multiple	2002–2014	30 Jul 2014	20	Disc.: NEAT; Alt.: 2014 OD153	MPC · JPL
0	2002 RC252	MBA-M	18.4	880 m	multiple	2002–2019	28 Oct 2019	55	Disc.: NEAT	MPC · JPL
0	2002 RT252	MCA	18.9	490 m	multiple	2002–2018	04 Nov 2018	67	Disc.: NEAT; Alt.: 2015 TQ87	MPC · JPL
2	2002 RB253	MBA-M	18.6	570 m	multiple	2002–2019	28 Nov 2019	25	Disc.: NEAT	MPC · JPL
1	2002 RH253	MBA-O	17.7	1.6 km	multiple	2002–2019	08 Jan 2019	35	Disc.: NEAT	MPC · JPL
1	2002 RY253	MBA-I	18.9	490 m	multiple	2001–2019	28 Nov 2019	59	Disc.: NEAT; Alt.: 2009 WH196	MPC · JPL
1	2002 RG254	MBA-O	17.4	1.8 km	multiple	2002–2018	13 Dec 2018	17	Disc.: NEAT	MPC · JPL
0	2002 RR255	MBA-M	18.0	750 m	multiple	2002–2019	05 Nov 2019	33	Disc.: NEAT; Alt.: 2019 SH78	MPC · JPL
0	2002 RH257	MBA-I	17.8	820 m	multiple	2002–2019	29 Oct 2019	24	Disc.: NEAT	MPC · JPL
0	2002 RU257	MBA-M	18.39	620 m	multiple	2002–2021	07 Feb 2021	29	Disc.: NEAT; Added on 17 June 2021	MPC · JPL
0	2002 RD258	MBA-I	19.91	310 m	multiple	2002-2023	15 Oct 2023	34	Disc.: NEAT	MPC · JPL
0	2002 RE258	MBA-I	18.8	520 m	multiple	2002–2019	23 Oct 2019	41	Disc.: NEAT	MPC · JPL
2	2002 RJ258	MBA-I	18.8	520 m	multiple	2002–2016	25 Nov 2016	50	Disc.: NEAT; Alt.: 2009 RU17	MPC · JPL
1	2002 RG259	MBA-M	18.4	1.2 km	multiple	2002–2020	05 Nov 2020	42	Disc.: NEAT	MPC · JPL
1	2002 RL259	MBA-M	18.35	590 m	multiple	2002-2024	01 Jan 2024	59	Disc.: NEAT	MPC · JPL
0	2002 RQ259	MBA-M	18.4	880 m	multiple	2002–2019	24 Oct 2019	39	Disc.: NEAT	MPC · JPL
0	2002 RY259	MBA-O	17.2	2.0 km	multiple	2002–2018	17 Aug 2018	41	Disc.: NEAT; Alt.: 2008 XR30	MPC · JPL
2	2002 RB260	MBA-I	18.7	540 m	multiple	2002–2021	03 Oct 2021	62	Disc.: NEAT; Alt.: 2021 PE47	MPC · JPL
0	2002 RG260	MBA-I	19.0	470 m	multiple	2002–2020	18 Oct 2020	49	Disc.: NEAT; Added on 19 October 2020	MPC · JPL
2	2002 RM260	MBA-M	19.0	670 m	multiple	2002–2019	05 Nov 2019	36	Disc.: NEAT	MPC · JPL
4	2002 RN260	HIL	16.4	2.9 km	multiple	2002–2018	02 Nov 2018	22	Disc.: NEAT	MPC · JPL
0	2002 RJ261	MCA	19.17	440 m	multiple	2002–2021	31 Oct 2021	27	Disc.: NEAT	MPC · JPL
	2002 RM262	MBA-I	19.3	410 m	multiple	2002–2015	23 Jun 2015	44	Disc.: NEAT; Alt.: 2012 QY31	MPC · JPL
0	2002 RV262	MBA-O	18.24	1.4 km	multiple	2002-2024	03 Dec 2024	36	Disc.: NEAT	MPC · JPL

back to top
