= List of unnumbered minor planets: 2002 Q (120–619) =

This is a partial list of unnumbered minor planets for principal provisional designations assigned during 16–31 August 2002. Since this period yielded a high number of provisional discoveries, it is further split into several standalone pages. As of March 2026, a total of 98 bodies remain unnumbered for this period. Objects for this year are listed on the following pages: A–B · C · D–F · G–K · L–O · P · Q_{i} · Q_{ii} · R_{i} · R_{ii} · S · T_{i} · T_{ii} · U–V and W–Y. Also see previous and next year.

Near-Earth obj.	MBA (inner)	MBA (outer)	Centaur
Mars-crosser	MBA (middle)	Jupiter trojan	Trans-Neptunian obj.
Unclassified

== Q ==
U	Designation	Class	Physical		Observations				Description and notes	Ref
U	Designation	Class	H	D	Opp.	Arc	Last	Used	Description and notes	Ref
–	2002 QJ120	MBA-M	19.3	410 m	single	17 days	15 Sep 2002	9	Disc.: NEAT	MPC · JPL
2	2002 QB121	MBA-M	17.99	1.3 km	multiple	2002-2025	07 Aug 2025	29	Disc.: NEAT	MPC · JPL
0	2002 QQ121	MBA-M	18.14	1.3 km	multiple	2002–2021	07 Nov 2021	43	Disc.: NEAT	MPC · JPL
0	2002 QS121	MBA-I	18.66	550 m	multiple	2002–2021	07 Apr 2021	73	Disc.: NEAT	MPC · JPL
2	2002 QX121	MBA-I	19.2	430 m	multiple	2002–2016	20 Oct 2016	26	Disc.: NEAT	MPC · JPL
0	2002 QK125	MBA-M	18.1	710 m	multiple	2002–2019	19 Nov 2019	35	Disc.: NEAT	MPC · JPL
0	2002 QL125	MBA-I	19.64	350 m	multiple	2002–2021	01 Jul 2021	33	Disc.: NEAT	MPC · JPL
0	2002 QV125	MBA-M	18.6	800 m	multiple	2002–2019	25 Sep 2019	46	Disc.: NEAT	MPC · JPL
3	2002 QD127	MBA-M	18.7	540 m	multiple	1998–2014	26 Jul 2014	30	Disc.: Spacewatch; Alt.: 1998 RO13	MPC · JPL
2	2002 QZ127	MBA-M	18.35	600 m	multiple	2002-2023	16 Dec 2023	50	Disc.: NEAT; Alt.: 2023 VR24	MPC · JPL
0	2002 QK128	MBA-M	17.9	1.1 km	multiple	2002–2019	29 Sep 2019	60	Disc.: NEAT	MPC · JPL
1	2002 QN128	MCA	18.8	520 m	multiple	2002–2017	17 Sep 2017	17	Disc.: NEAT	MPC · JPL
–	2002 QB129	MBA-I	19.4	390 m	single	12 days	30 Aug 2002	11	Disc.: NEAT	MPC · JPL
1	2002 QD130	MBA-O	16.3	3.1 km	multiple	2002–2018	18 Oct 2018	49	Disc.: NEAT	MPC · JPL
0	2002 QA131	MBA-M	17.6	1.3 km	multiple	2002–2019	24 Oct 2019	52	Disc.: NEAT	MPC · JPL
1	2002 QD131	MBA-M	17.9	1.1 km	multiple	2002–2019	25 Jul 2019	25	Disc.: NEAT	MPC · JPL
1	2002 QV131	MBA-M	18.0	750 m	multiple	2002–2020	22 Jan 2020	61	Disc.: NEAT; Alt.: 2015 XY367	MPC · JPL
1	2002 QA132	MBA-I	19.1	450 m	multiple	2002–2019	28 May 2019	42	Disc.: NEAT	MPC · JPL
1	2002 QH132	MBA-I	18.9	490 m	multiple	2002–2019	24 Sep 2019	33	Disc.: NEAT	MPC · JPL
0	2002 QK132	MBA-O	17.73	1.6 km	multiple	2002–2021	28 Aug 2021	29	Disc.: NEAT; Added on 21 August 2021	MPC · JPL
1	2002 QU132	MBA-M	18.4	880 m	multiple	1998–2019	24 Oct 2019	70	Disc.: NEAT	MPC · JPL
0	2002 QN133	MBA-O	17.33	1.9 km	multiple	2002-2022	31 Jan 2022	32	Disc.: NEAT	MPC · JPL
0	2002 QO133	MBA-M	18.0	1.1 km	multiple	2002–2021	05 Jan 2021	65	Disc.: NEAT	MPC · JPL
0	2002 QP133	MBA-M	18.2	960 m	multiple	2002–2015	02 Nov 2015	30	Disc.: NEAT	MPC · JPL
2	2002 QQ133	MBA-M	18.8	520 m	multiple	2002–2018	05 Aug 2018	39	Disc.: NEAT; Alt.: 2014 NY49	MPC · JPL
0	2002 QZ133	MBA-M	18.0	750 m	multiple	2002–2019	19 Dec 2019	43	Disc.: NEAT	MPC · JPL
0	2002 QE134	MBA-M	18.0	1.1 km	multiple	2002–2019	24 Oct 2019	43	Disc.: NEAT	MPC · JPL
0	2002 QU134	MBA-I	18.7	540 m	multiple	2002–2017	19 Nov 2017	24	Disc.: NEAT	MPC · JPL
1	2002 QX134	MBA-I	18.6	570 m	multiple	2002–2016	30 Oct 2016	37	Disc.: NEAT	MPC · JPL
0	2002 QB135	MBA-M	17.6	1.3 km	multiple	2002–2020	08 Dec 2020	57	Disc.: NEAT; Alt.: 2015 TA262	MPC · JPL
2	2002 QR135	MCA	19.2	430 m	multiple	2002–2020	23 Nov 2020	40	Disc.: NEAT	MPC · JPL
0	2002 QU135	HUN	18.9	490 m	multiple	2001–2016	31 Mar 2016	21	Disc.: NEAT	MPC · JPL
4	2002 QF136	MBA-O	16.7	2.5 km	multiple	2002–2018	05 Oct 2018	25	Disc.: NEAT	MPC · JPL
0	2002 QG136	MBA-M	18.4	620 m	multiple	2002-2021	07 Jan 2021	35	Disc.: NEAT	MPC · JPL4
0	2002 QH136	MBA-M	17.9	780 m	multiple	2002–2019	25 Nov 2019	32	Disc.: NEAT	MPC · JPL
0	2002 QM136	MBA-M	17.3	1.5 km	multiple	2002–2020	19 Dec 2020	70	Disc.: NEAT; Alt.: 2015 RU16	MPC · JPL
–	2002 QQ136	MBA-I	19.4	390 m	single	24 days	11 Sep 2002	7	Disc.: NEAT	MPC · JPL
0	2002 QR136	MBA-M	17.91	1.2 km	multiple	2002-2024	22 Nov 2024	51	Disc.: NEAT	MPC · JPL
0	2002 QB137	MBA-M	18.82	720 m	multiple	2002–2015	03 Nov 2015	41	Disc.: NEAT	MPC · JPL
1	2002 QD137	MCA	18.6	570 m	multiple	2002–2016	27 Sep 2016	35	Disc.: NEAT	MPC · JPL
0	2002 QW137	MBA-I	19.2	430 m	multiple	2002–2019	21 Oct 2019	55	Disc.: NEAT	MPC · JPL
0	2002 QD138	MBA-I	19.0	470 m	multiple	2002–2020	16 Dec 2020	55	Disc.: NEAT	MPC · JPL
0	2002 QU138	MBA-M	17.86	1.5 km	multiple	2002–2021	25 Nov 2021	59	Disc.: NEAT; Alt.: 2020 JZ9	MPC · JPL
0	2002 QZ138	MBA-M	18.1	1.0 km	multiple	2002–2019	06 Sep 2019	100	Disc.: NEAT	MPC · JPL
0	2002 QF139	MBA-I	18.6	570 m	multiple	2002–2019	29 Nov 2019	66	Disc.: NEAT	MPC · JPL
1	2002 QK139	MBA-O	17.1	2.1 km	multiple	2002–2021	11 Jan 2021	33	Disc.: NEAT	MPC · JPL
1	2002 QB140	MBA-I	19.1	450 m	multiple	2002–2020	22 Apr 2020	49	Disc.: NEAT	MPC · JPL
2	2002 QD140	MBA-M	18.1	710 m	multiple	1998–2010	04 Jul 2010	28	Disc.: NEAT	MPC · JPL
0	2002 QA141	MBA-M	17.8	820 m	multiple	2002–2015	03 Dec 2015	30	Disc.: NEAT; Alt.: 2006 PW42	MPC · JPL
1	2002 QJ141	MBA-I	18.8	520 m	multiple	2002–2019	09 May 2019	33	Disc.: NEAT; Alt.: 2016 PX195	MPC · JPL
1	2002 QK141	MBA-I	18.1	710 m	multiple	2002–2017	27 May 2017	36	Disc.: NEAT	MPC · JPL
2	2002 QL141	MBA-M	18.1	710 m	multiple	2002–2018	15 Jun 2018	27	Disc.: NEAT	MPC · JPL
0	2002 QV141	MBA-I	18.9	490 m	multiple	2002–2020	07 Dec 2020	42	Disc.: NEAT	MPC · JPL
1	2002 QX141	MBA-I	18.7	540 m	multiple	2002–2020	23 Oct 2020	25	Disc.: NEAT	MPC · JPL
0	2002 QD142	MBA-O	17.1	2.1 km	multiple	2002–2018	13 Sep 2018	46	Disc.: NEAT; Alt.: 2015 AK66	MPC · JPL
0	2002 QJ142	MBA-O	17.2	2.0 km	multiple	2002–2019	05 Nov 2019	29	Disc.: NEAT	MPC · JPL
–	2002 QT142	MBA-O	17.4	1.8 km	single	16 days	12 Sep 2002	9	Disc.: NEAT	MPC · JPL
0	2002 QD143	MBA-M	18.00	750 m	multiple	2002–2021	09 Apr 2021	77	Disc.: NEAT; Alt.: 2006 SA28	MPC · JPL
0	2002 QH143	MBA-M	17.5	1.3 km	multiple	2002–2021	18 Jan 2021	70	Disc.: NEAT	MPC · JPL
2	2002 QL143	MBA-I	18.3	650 m	multiple	2002–2010	13 Nov 2010	47	Disc.: NEAT; Alt.: 2010 OJ89	MPC · JPL
0	2002 QY143	MBA-O	16.9	2.3 km	multiple	2002–2018	13 Sep 2018	37	Disc.: NEAT	MPC · JPL
0	2002 QM144	MBA-O	17.7	1.6 km	multiple	2002–2018	08 Nov 2018	32	Disc.: NEAT	MPC · JPL
0	2002 QA145	MBA-I	18.7	540 m	multiple	1999–2020	30 Jan 2020	48	Disc.: NEAT; Alt.: 2020 BK70	MPC · JPL
3	2002 QC145	MBA-I	19.5	370 m	multiple	2002–2012	05 Nov 2012	24	Disc.: NEAT	MPC · JPL
0	2002 QP145	MCA	19.67	310 m	multiple	2002-2024	29 Nov 2024	40	Disc.: NEAT	MPC · JPL
1	2002 QX145	MBA-I	19.3	410 m	multiple	2002–2016	08 Aug 2016	26	Disc.: NEAT	MPC · JPL
0	2002 QZ145	MBA-I	18.8	520 m	multiple	2002–2019	24 Oct 2019	39	Disc.: NEAT	MPC · JPL
0	2002 QH146	MBA-M	17.8	1.2 km	multiple	2002–2017	03 Jan 2017	52	Disc.: NEAT; Alt.: 2015 NO19	MPC · JPL
0	2002 QZ146	MBA-O	17.3	1.9 km	multiple	2002–2019	28 Nov 2019	47	Disc.: NEAT; Added on 22 July 2020; Alt.: 2019 SW45	MPC · JPL
2	2002 QO147	MBA-M	18.47	600 m	multiple	2002-2022	04 Jul 2022	25	Disc.: NEAT	MPC · JPL
0	2002 QY147	MBA-I	18.6	570 m	multiple	2002–2019	29 Nov 2019	71	Disc.: NEAT	MPC · JPL
1	2002 QP149	MBA-I	19.59	360 m	multiple	2002-2022	17 Nov 2022	60	Disc.: NEAT	MPC · JPL
0	2002 QU149	MBA-O	17.51	1.7 km	multiple	2002-2022	01 Dec 2022	36	Disc.: NEAT	MPC · JPL
0	2002 QH150	MBA-O	17.47	1.8 km	multiple	2002–2021	15 Apr 2021	28	Disc.: NEAT	MPC · JPL
0	2002 QR150	MBA-I	18.9	490 m	multiple	2002–2021	08 Jun 2021	55	Disc.: NEAT	MPC · JPL
–	2002 QJ151	MBA-M	18.5	590 m	single	27 days	13 Sep 2002	8	Disc.: NEAT	MPC · JPL
0	2002 QE152	MBA-I	18.95	480 m	multiple	2002–2021	30 Jun 2021	44	Disc.: NEAT	MPC · JPL
0	2002 QS152	MBA-I	19.3	410 m	multiple	1999–2015	07 Jul 2015	31	Disc.: NEAT	MPC · JPL
–	2002 QF153	MBA-M	18.8	520 m	single	11 days	30 Aug 2002	9	Disc.: NEAT	MPC · JPL
0	2002 QP153	MBA-M	17.2	1.5 km	multiple	2002–2019	30 Nov 2019	107	Disc.: NEAT	MPC · JPL
1	2002 QS153	MBA-M	18.6	570 m	multiple	2002–2019	27 Oct 2019	32	Disc.: NEAT	MPC · JPL
1	2002 QU154	MBA-O	17.59	1.8 km	multiple	2002-2023	09 Nov 2023	42	Disc.: NEAT	MPC · JPL
1	2002 QG155	MBA-M	18.32	620 m	multiple	2002-2023	09 Dec 2023	54	Disc.: NEAT	MPC · JPL
2	2002 QL155	MBA-M	17.5	940 m	multiple	2002–2019	28 Dec 2019	35	Disc.: NEAT; Alt.: 2019 XH3	MPC · JPL
0	2002 QT155	MBA-O	17.1	2.1 km	multiple	2002–2019	31 Dec 2019	84	Disc.: NEAT; Alt.: 2013 QE81	MPC · JPL
0	2002 QY155	MBA-I	18.7	540 m	multiple	2002–2019	26 Nov 2019	70	Disc.: NEAT	MPC · JPL
0	2002 QH156	MBA-I	18.6	570 m	multiple	2002–2020	15 Nov 2020	74	Disc.: NEAT	MPC · JPL
0	2002 QC157	MBA-O	17.1	2.1 km	multiple	2002–2021	08 May 2021	30	Disc.: NEAT	MPC · JPL
1	2002 QD157	MBA-M	17.7	860 m	multiple	2002–2018	14 Jun 2018	40	Disc.: NEAT	MPC · JPL
1	2002 QH157	MBA-I	18.8	520 m	multiple	1995–2020	12 Dec 2020	47	Disc.: NEAT	MPC · JPL
0	2002 QB159	MBA-I	18.3	650 m	multiple	2002–2017	13 Nov 2017	36	Disc.: NEAT	MPC · JPL
0	2002 QX159	MBA-M	18.3	920 m	multiple	2002–2019	27 Oct 2019	41	Disc.: LPL/Spacewatch II	MPC · JPL
0	2002 QY159	MBA-M	18.2	960 m	multiple	2002–2019	05 Nov 2019	40	Disc.: LPL/Spacewatch II	MPC · JPL
0	2002 QC160	MBA-M	18.2	960 m	multiple	2002–2019	20 Aug 2019	30	Disc.: NEAT	MPC · JPL
0	2002 QL160	MBA-M	18.1	710 m	multiple	2002–2020	23 Jan 2020	26	Disc.: LPL/Spacewatch II	MPC · JPL
0	2002 QN160	MBA-M	17.4	1.4 km	multiple	2002–2019	02 Dec 2019	47	Disc.: LPL/Spacewatch II; Added on 17 January 2021	MPC · JPL
0	2002 QS160	MBA-O	17.2	2.0 km	multiple	2002–2021	09 Jul 2021	32	Disc.: NEAT; Added on 5 November 2021	MPC · JPL

back to top
