= List of unnumbered minor planets: 2002 R (263–619) =

This is a partial list of unnumbered minor planets for principal provisional designations assigned during 1–15 September 2002. Since this period yielded a high number of provisional discoveries, it is further split into several standalone pages. As of March 2026, a total of 115 bodies remain unnumbered for this period. Objects for this year are listed on the following pages: A–B · C · D–F · G–K · L–O · P · Q_{i} · Q_{ii} · R_{i} · R_{ii} · S · T_{i} · T_{ii} · U–V and W–Y. Also see previous and next year.

Near-Earth obj.	MBA (inner)	MBA (outer)	Centaur
Mars-crosser	MBA (middle)	Jupiter trojan	Trans-Neptunian obj.
Unclassified

== R ==
U	Designation	Class	Physical		Observations				Description and notes	Ref
U	Designation	Class	H	D	Opp.	Arc	Last	Used	Description and notes	Ref
3	2002 RG263	MBA-M	19.9	310 m	multiple	2002–2018	13 Jul 2018	28	Disc.: NEAT; Alt.: 2006 RC25	MPC · JPL
0	2002 RU263	MBA-I	19.2	430 m	multiple	2002–2021	18 Jan 2021	32	align=left | Disc.: NEAT; Alt.: 2009 SZ106 || MPC · JPL	
0	2002 RL264	MBA-M	18.2	960 m	multiple	2002–2015	03 Nov 2015	58	Disc.: NEAT	MPC · JPL
1	2002 RM264	MCA	19.0	470 m	multiple	2002–2019	23 Sep 2019	36	Disc.: NEAT	MPC · JPL
0	2002 RO264	MBA-I	18.6	570 m	multiple	2002–2020	19 Oct 2020	85	Disc.: NEAT	MPC · JPL
0	2002 RT264	MBA-I	18.46	600 m	multiple	2002–2021	01 Nov 2021	39	Disc.: NEAT	MPC · JPL
0	2002 RA265	MBA-O	18.27	1.9 km	multiple	2002-2025	19 Nov 2025	74	Disc.: NEAT	MPC · JPL
2	2002 RD265	MBA-M	18.2	680 m	multiple	2002–2014	02 Sep 2014	17	Disc.: NEAT; Alt.: 2014 RT4	MPC · JPL
	2002 RE265	MBA-I	18.4	620 m	multiple	2002–2020	11 Sep 2020	28	Disc.: NEAT; Alt.: 2020 OR99	MPC · JPL
1	2002 RL265	MBA-I	19.35	390 m	multiple	2002-2024	30 Oct 2024	57	Disc.: NEAT	MPC · JPL
0	2002 RM265	MBA-M	18.4	880 m	multiple	2002–2019	06 Sep 2019	41	Disc.: NEAT; Alt.: 2015 TT253	MPC · JPL
0	2002 RV265	HIL	15.9	3.7 km	multiple	2000–2019	23 Oct 2019	52	Disc.: NEAT; Alt.: 2010 MP54	MPC · JPL
0	2002 RW265	MBA-M	18.2	960 m	multiple	2002–2019	08 Jun 2019	49	Disc.: NEAT; Alt.: 2015 PD160	MPC · JPL
0	2002 RG267	MBA-I	18.6	570 m	multiple	2002–2020	16 Nov 2020	61	Disc.: NEAT; Alt.: 2013 TM207	MPC · JPL
0	2002 RF268	MBA-M	18.2	960 m	multiple	2002–2019	02 Nov 2019	47	Disc.: NEAT	MPC · JPL
1	2002 RC269	MBA-M	18.3	650 m	multiple	2002–2020	25 Jan 2020	46	Disc.: NEAT; Alt.: 2016 BD55	MPC · JPL
1	2002 RU269	MBA-M	18.2	1.3 km	multiple	2002–2020	22 Jul 2020	43	Disc.: NEAT; Alt.: 2016 SV77	MPC · JPL
3	2002 RB270	MBA-I	19.1	450 m	multiple	2002–2010	06 Dec 2010	36	Disc.: NEAT; Alt.: 2006 UR154	MPC · JPL
0	2002 RJ270	MBA-O	16.6	2.7 km	multiple	2002–2020	21 Jan 2020	82	Disc.: NEAT; Alt.: 2013 UX9	MPC · JPL
2	2002 RB271	MBA-M	18.39	680 m	multiple	2002-2023	12 Nov 2023	26	Disc.: NEAT; Alt.: 2023 UL21	MPC · JPL
0	2002 RE271	MBA-I	18.8	520 m	multiple	2002–2017	26 Nov 2017	36	Disc.: NEAT	MPC · JPL
0	2002 RF271	MBA-I	19.14	440 m	multiple	2002–2021	30 Nov 2021	55	Disc.: NEAT; Added on 5 November 2021	MPC · JPL
1	2002 RH271	MBA-I	19.5	370 m	multiple	2002–2018	17 Aug 2018	25	Disc.: NEAT	MPC · JPL
0	2002 RN271	MBA-I	19.08	450 m	multiple	2002-2022	23 Sep 2022	57	Disc.: NEAT	MPC · JPL
3	2002 RF272	MBA-I	19.7	340 m	multiple	2002–2019	25 Sep 2019	24	Disc.: NEAT	MPC · JPL
0	2002 RK272	MBA-O	17.25	2.0 km	multiple	2002-2020	23 Jan 2020	37	Disc.: NEAT	MPC · JPL
0	2002 RX272	MBA-M	18.2	680 m	multiple	2002–2019	05 Nov 2019	48	Disc.: NEAT	MPC · JPL
2	2002 RM273	MBA-M	18.2	1.3 km	multiple	2002–2020	11 Oct 2020	72	Disc.: NEAT	MPC · JPL
2	2002 RZ273	MBA-I	19.6	360 m	multiple	2002–2016	02 Nov 2016	43	Disc.: NEAT	MPC · JPL
0	2002 RB274	MBA-M	18.4	620 m	multiple	2000–2019	26 Nov 2019	43	Disc.: NEAT	MPC · JPL
0	2002 RQ274	MBA-O	17.5	1.8 km	multiple	2002–2020	21 Jan 2020	19	Disc.: NEAT	MPC · JPL
0	2002 RU275	MBA-M	17.4	980 m	multiple	2002–2019	19 Nov 2019	24	Disc.: NEAT	MPC · JPL
3	2002 RA276	MBA-M	19.2	610 m	multiple	2002–2015	01 Oct 2015	30	Disc.: NEAT	MPC · JPL
0	2002 RB276	MBA-M	19.75	340 m	multiple	2002-2018	04 Oct 2018	33	Disc.: NEAT; Alt.: 2015 VW212	MPC · JPL
5	2002 RF276	MBA-I	19.4	390 m	multiple	2002–2019	26 Sep 2019	18	Disc.: NEAT; Added on 21 August 2021	MPC · JPL
1	2002 RG276	MBA-I	19.97	300 m	multiple	2002-2022	02 Sep 2022	53	Disc.: NEAT	MPC · JPL
0	2002 RL276	MBA-M	18.08	1.3 km	multiple	2002–2022	25 Jan 2022	36	Disc.: NEAT; Alt.: 2015 ME175	MPC · JPL
0	2002 RP276	MBA-M	18.3	650 m	multiple	2002–2020	22 Jan 2020	49	Disc.: NEAT	MPC · JPL
0	2002 RR276	MBA-I	18.8	520 m	multiple	2002–2019	04 Dec 2019	51	Disc.: NEAT	MPC · JPL
1	2002 RX276	MBA-O	18.61	1.1 km	multiple	2002–2021	29 Oct 2021	110	Disc.: NEAT; Alt.: 2021 NJ6	MPC · JPL
0	2002 RA277	MBA-M	18.6	800 m	multiple	1998–2019	25 Sep 2019	46	Disc.: NEAT	MPC · JPL
0	2002 RF277	MBA-O	17.4	1.8 km	multiple	2002–2019	25 Nov 2019	28	Disc.: NEAT	MPC · JPL
0	2002 RD278	MBA-M	17.8	820 m	multiple	2002–2019	23 Oct 2019	36	Disc.: NEAT	MPC · JPL
1	2002 RS278	MBA-M	18.5	590 m	multiple	2002–2016	11 Jan 2016	20	Disc.: NEAT	MPC · JPL
0	2002 RA279	MBA-I	18.8	520 m	multiple	2002–2019	02 Jun 2019	47	Disc.: NEAT; Alt.: 2009 SE273	MPC · JPL
0	2002 RV279	MBA-I	18.7	540 m	multiple	2002–2020	24 Jun 2020	32	Disc.: NEAT; Added on 21 August 2021	MPC · JPL
0	2002 RZ279	MBA-I	19.11	450 m	multiple	2002–2021	09 Nov 2021	36	Disc.: NEAT	MPC · JPL
1	2002 RL280	MBA-I	19.6	360 m	multiple	2002–2018	14 Sep 2018	22	Disc.: NEAT	MPC · JPL
1	2002 RR280	MBA-M	18.6	570 m	multiple	2002–2018	07 Aug 2018	38	Disc.: NEAT; Alt.: 2014 QW337	MPC · JPL
0	2002 RB281	MCA	18.7	540 m	multiple	2002–2021	15 Jun 2021	69	Disc.: NEAT	MPC · JPL
0	2002 RH281	MCA	19.19	430 m	multiple	2002–2019	25 Sep 2019	46	Disc.: NEAT; Alt.: 2009 US41	MPC · JPL
0	2002 RO281	MBA-I	18.7	540 m	multiple	2002–2020	05 Nov 2020	56	Disc.: NEAT	MPC · JPL
0	2002 RP281	MBA-I	19.5	370 m	multiple	2002–2019	26 Sep 2019	22	Disc.: NEAT	MPC · JPL
1	2002 RS281	MBA-I	19.4	390 m	multiple	2002–2019	25 Sep 2019	26	Disc.: NEAT	MPC · JPL
1	2002 RT281	MBA-I	19.0	470 m	multiple	2002–2020	15 Sep 2020	36	Disc.: NEAT; Added on 19 October 2020	MPC · JPL
1	2002 RV281	MBA-M	18.1	710 m	multiple	2002–2020	19 Jan 2020	56	Disc.: NEAT	MPC · JPL
1	2002 RE282	MBA-I	18.9	490 m	multiple	2002–2020	16 Nov 2020	20	Disc.: NEAT; Added on 9 March 2021	MPC · JPL
3	2002 RK282	MBA-I	18.6	570 m	multiple	2002–2020	04 Nov 2020	27	Disc.: NEAT	MPC · JPL
0	2002 RP282	MBA-M	18.2	680 m	multiple	2002–2020	26 Jan 2020	52	Disc.: NEAT	MPC · JPL
0	2002 RB283	MBA-I	19.05	460 m	multiple	2002–2022	25 Jan 2022	31	Disc.: NEAT	MPC · JPL
1	2002 RC283	MBA-I	18.4	620 m	multiple	2002–2018	09 Nov 2018	41	Disc.: NEAT; Alt.: 2006 SB107, 2010 UY19	MPC · JPL
1	2002 RJ283	MBA-I	18.4	620 m	multiple	2002–2013	06 Oct 2013	16	Disc.: NEAT	MPC · JPL
5	2002 RM283	MBA-I	19.8	330 m	multiple	2002–2020	23 Sep 2020	29	Disc.: NEAT; Alt.: 2020 PQ74	MPC · JPL
0	2002 RO283	MBA-O	17.6	1.7 km	multiple	2002–2017	25 Oct 2017	32	Disc.: NEAT	MPC · JPL
1	2002 RP283	MBA-M	17.9	780 m	multiple	2002–2018	10 Jul 2018	52	Disc.: NEAT	MPC · JPL
0	2002 RF284	MBA-M	18.2	960 m	multiple	2002–2019	27 Oct 2019	58	Disc.: NEAT; Alt.: 2015 TN258	MPC · JPL
1	2002 RB285	MBA-I	19.0	470 m	multiple	2002–2017	22 Nov 2017	33	Disc.: NEAT; Alt.: 2013 SS11	MPC · JPL
0	2002 RM285	MBA-M	18.9	700 m	multiple	2002–2019	26 Nov 2019	43	Disc.: NEAT	MPC · JPL
0	2002 RU285	MBA-I	19.1	450 m	multiple	2002–2020	15 Oct 2020	39	Disc.: NEAT; Added on 9 March 2021; Alt.: 2020 RE35	MPC · JPL
1	2002 RW285	MBA-M	18.3	920 m	multiple	2002–2019	22 Oct 2019	20	Disc.: NEAT; Added on 21 August 2021	MPC · JPL
0	2002 RH286	MBA-I	17.8	820 m	multiple	2002–2020	17 Dec 2020	50	Disc.: AMOS	MPC · JPL
1	2002 RS286	MBA-M	18.47	470 m	multiple	2002-2023	08 Dec 2023	102	Disc.: NEAT	MPC · JPL
1	2002 RT286	MBA-M	17.8	1.5 km	multiple	2002–2020	05 Nov 2020	43	Disc.: NEAT	MPC · JPL
1	2002 RZ286	MBA-I	19.2	430 m	multiple	2002–2017	17 Nov 2017	33	Disc.: NEAT	MPC · JPL
1	2002 RF287	MBA-M	18.8	520 m	multiple	2002–2019	18 Nov 2019	20	Disc.: NEAT	MPC · JPL
1	2002 RG287	MBA-I	18.6	570 m	multiple	2013–2017	10 Dec 2017	33	Disc.: NEAT	MPC · JPL
1	2002 RJ287	MBA-I	19.0	470 m	multiple	2002–2021	30 Oct 2021	41	Disc.: NEAT	MPC · JPL
1	2002 RK287	MBA-O	18.33	1.2 km	multiple	2002-2022	26 Jul 2022	36	Disc.: NEAT	MPC · JPL
0	2002 RR287	MBA-I	19.1	450 m	multiple	2002–2019	29 Oct 2019	42	Disc.: NEAT	MPC · JPL
0	2002 RW287	MBA-I	19.2	430 m	multiple	2002–2018	15 Sep 2018	41	Disc.: NEAT; Alt.: 2015 UO20	MPC · JPL
1	2002 RZ287	MBA-O	18.36	2.2 km	multiple	2002-2024	28 Sep 2024	31	Disc.: NEAT	MPC · JPL
0	2002 RJ288	MBA-M	17.88	1.1 km	multiple	2002-2022	24 May 2022	38	Disc.: NEAT	MPC · JPL
0	2002 RW288	MBA-I	18.7	540 m	multiple	2002–2019	05 Nov 2019	46	Disc.: NEAT	MPC · JPL
0	2002 RE289	MBA-O	16.42	2.9 km	multiple	1991–2021	03 Apr 2021	183	Disc.: NEAT; Alt.: 2013 RA88	MPC · JPL
1	2002 RK289	MBA-I	19.1	450 m	multiple	2002–2019	25 Sep 2019	32	Disc.: NEAT	MPC · JPL
0	2002 RW289	MBA-I	18.8	520 m	multiple	2002–2019	28 Nov 2019	82	Disc.: NEAT	MPC · JPL
0	2002 RX289	MBA-I	18.2	680 m	multiple	2002–2021	18 Jan 2021	65	Disc.: AMOS	MPC · JPL
0	2002 RZ289	MBA-M	18.3	920 m	multiple	2002–2020	10 Dec 2020	47	Disc.: NEAT	MPC · JPL
0	2002 RQ291	MBA-M	17.9	1.1 km	multiple	2002–2020	10 Dec 2020	56	Disc.: NEAT	MPC · JPL
1	2002 RV291	MBA-I	18.7	540 m	multiple	2002–2021	18 Jan 2021	50	Disc.: NEAT	MPC · JPL
–	2002 RG292	MBA-M	18.5	590 m	single	27 days	12 Sep 2002	13	Disc.: NEAT	MPC · JPL
0	2002 RA293	MBA-M	18.67	780 m	multiple	2002–2019	28 Nov 2019	62	Disc.: NEAT; Added on 22 July 2020	MPC · JPL
1	2002 RB293	MBA-O	17.8	1.3 km	multiple	2002-2024	09 Nov 2024	41	Disc.: NEAT	MPC · JPL
1	2002 RG294	MBA-I	19.1	450 m	multiple	2002–2020	02 Feb 2020	35	Disc.: NEAT	MPC · JPL
1	2002 RU294	MBA-M	17.9	780 m	multiple	2002–2020	02 Feb 2020	48	Disc.: AMOS	MPC · JPL
0	2002 RP295	MBA-I	17.62	880 m	multiple	2001-2023	29 Jan 2023	43	Disc.: NEAT	MPC · JPL
2	2002 RA296	MCA	18.8	730 m	multiple	2002–2015	04 Dec 2015	62	Disc.: NEAT; Alt.: 2015 RE35	MPC · JPL
0	2002 RM296	MCA	18.9	490 m	multiple	2002–2018	13 Aug 2018	45	Disc.: NEAT	MPC · JPL
0	2002 RY296	MBA-M	18.26	680 m	multiple	2002-2025	23 Feb 2025	35	Disc.: NEAT	MPC · JPL
1	2002 RC297	MBA-M	17.6	1.3 km	multiple	1998–2019	31 Oct 2019	78	Disc.: NEAT	MPC · JPL
0	2002 RJ297	MBA-I	18.25	670 m	multiple	2002–2022	27 Jan 2022	41	Disc.: AMOS	MPC · JPL
0	2002 RJ299	MBA-M	18.1	1.0 km	multiple	2002–2020	24 Jan 2020	76	Disc.: NEAT	MPC · JPL
0	2002 RS299	MBA-M	18.0	1.1 km	multiple	2002–2019	03 Oct 2019	43	Disc.: SDSS	MPC · JPL
0	2002 RA300	MBA-I	18.6	570 m	multiple	2002–2019	22 Jun 2019	33	Disc.: SDSS	MPC · JPL
1	2002 RB300	MBA-O	17.5	1.8 km	multiple	2002–2019	26 Feb 2019	38	Disc.: SDSS	MPC · JPL
0	2002 RC300	MBA-I	18.9	490 m	multiple	2002–2019	28 Nov 2019	71	Disc.: NEAT; Alt.: 2010 DA101	MPC · JPL
0	2002 RH300	MCA	18.5	590 m	multiple	2002–2019	30 Nov 2019	40	Disc.: NEAT	MPC · JPL
0	2002 RL300	MBA-I	18.5	590 m	multiple	2002–2019	04 Oct 2019	51	Disc.: SDSS	MPC · JPL
0	2002 RT300	MBA-I	18.3	650 m	multiple	2002–2019	24 Aug 2019	40	Disc.: SDSS	MPC · JPL
1	2002 RU300	MBA-I	18.9	490 m	multiple	1995–2020	23 Nov 2020	50	Disc.: NEAT	MPC · JPL
1	2002 RA301	MBA-M	17.1	1.1 km	multiple	2002–2020	20 Jan 2020	44	Disc.: SDSS	MPC · JPL
2	2002 RO301	MBA-M	19.0	470 m	multiple	2002–2018	05 Aug 2018	29	Disc.: SDSS	MPC · JPL
0	2002 RQ301	MBA-O	17.7	1.6 km	multiple	2002–2018	05 Oct 2018	36	Disc.: NEAT; Added on 22 July 2020	MPC · JPL

back to top
