= List of unnumbered minor planets: 2002 W–Y =

This is a partial list of unnumbered minor planets for principal provisional designations assigned between 16 November and 31 December 2002. As of March 2026, a total of 68 bodies remain unnumbered for this period. Objects for this year are listed on the following pages: A–B · C · D–F · G–K · L–O · P · Q_{i} · Q_{ii} · R_{i} · R_{ii} · S · T_{i} · T_{ii} · U–V and W–Y. Also see previous and next year.

Near-Earth obj.	MBA (inner)	MBA (outer)	Centaur
Mars-crosser	MBA (middle)	Jupiter trojan	Trans-Neptunian obj.
Unclassified

== W ==
U	Designation	Class	Physical		Observations				Description and notes	Ref
U	Designation	Class	H	D	Opp.	Arc	Last	Used	Description and notes	Ref
0	2002 WQ	AMO	18.6	680 m	multiple	2002–2017	06 Feb 2017	83	Disc.: NEAT	MPC; JPL
0	2002 WX12	APO	19.8	390 m	multiple	2002–2019	01 Aug 2019	102	Disc.: LINEAR	MPC; JPL
2	2002 WT17	MCA	18.39	1.3 km	multiple	2002-2026	10 Nov 2026	34	Disc.: LINEAR	2002+WT17in
3	2002 WA20	MBA-O	17.0	2.2 km	multiple	2002–2019	30 Jan 2019	30	Disc.: NEAT	MPC; JPL
1	2002 WT20	MBA-O	17.86	1.7 km	multiple	2002–2023	10 Oct 2023	51	Disc.: Mauna Kea Obs.	MPC; JPL
4	2002 WL21	TNO	7.69	96 km	multiple	2002–2021	11 Jan 2021	25	Disc.: Mauna Kea Obs. LoUTNOs, cubewano (cold)	MPC; JPL
0	2002 WS22	MBA-M	18.3	650 m	multiple	2002–2020	24 Jan 2020	40	Disc.: NEAT	MPC; JPL
0	2002 WD31	HUN	18.94	480 m	multiple	2002–2021	30 Jun 2021	87	Disc.: NEAT; Alt.: 2012 XJ80	MPC; JPL
0	2002 WT31	MCA	18.7	540 m	multiple	2002–2020	21 Mar 2020	47	Disc.: NEAT	MPC; JPL
0	2002 WY31	MBA-M	18.41	1.0 km	multiple	2002-2023	12 Dec 2023	54	Disc.: Mauna Kea Obs.	MPC; JPL
0	2002 WE33	MBA-M	17.8	820 m	multiple	2002–2020	15 Feb 2020	35	Disc.: NEAT; Added on 17 January 2021	MPC; JPL

back to top

== X ==
U	Designation	Class	Physical		Observations				Description and notes	Ref
U	Designation	Class	H	D	Opp.	Arc	Last	Used	Description and notes	Ref
0	2002 XA	AMO	19.49	450 m	multiple	2002–2022	21 Jan 2022	467	Disc.: LINEAR	MPC; JPL
0	2002 XB	ATE	21.88	150 m	multiple	2002–2022	05 Jan 2022	67	Disc.: LINEAR	MPC; JPL
4	2002 XO1	AMO	20.7	260 m	single	91 days	05 Jan 2003	43	Disc.: LINEAR	MPC; JPL
0	2002 XN4	MBA-I	17.5	940 m	multiple	2002–2017	22 Nov 2017	24	Disc.: Table Mountain Obs.	MPC; JPL
6	2002 XT4	APO	24.0	56 m	single	28 days	28 Dec 2002	35	Disc.: LINEAR	MPC; JPL
0	2002 XU4	AMO	21.9	150 m	multiple	2002–2020	26 May 2020	48	Disc.: NEAT	MPC; JPL
0	2002 XW4	AMO	21.69	160 m	multiple	2002–2022	06 Jan 2022	60	Disc.: LINEAR	MPC; JPL
3	2002 XM14	AMO	21.4	190 m	multiple	2002–2018	10 Dec 2018	59	Disc.: LINEAR	MPC; JPL
5	2002 XO14	APO	22.1	140 m	single	131 days	25 Mar 2003	139	Disc.: LINEAR	MPC; JPL
5	2002 XS14	APO	24.2	51 m	single	55 days	30 Jan 2003	65	Disc.: LINEAR; AMO at MPC	MPC; JPL
9	2002 XM35	APO	23.0	89 m	single	1 day	02 Dec 2002	9	Disc.: LINEAR	MPC; JPL
0	2002 XN37	MCA	19.46	710 m	multiple	2002–2022	06 Jan 2022	47	Disc.: NEAT	MPC; JPL
–	2002 XX38	MCA	19.2	430 m	single	17 days	11 Dec 2002	17	Disc.: LPL/Spacewatch II	MPC; JPL
1	2002 XE39	MCA	18.3	650 m	multiple	2002–2020	26 Jan 2020	41	Disc.: NEAT	MPC; JPL
0	2002 XW39	MCA	20.35	360 m	multiple	2002–2020	31 Jan 2020	167	Disc.: LINEAR	MPC; JPL
6	2002 XY39	AMO	21.6	170 m	single	49 days	29 Jan 2003	31	Disc.: NEAT	MPC; JPL
5	2002 XB40	APO	23.9	59 m	single	18 days	28 Dec 2002	28	Disc.: LINEAR	MPC; JPL
–	2002 XC40	MCA	19.1	640 m	single	2 days	12 Dec 2002	15	Disc.: LINEAR	MPC; JPL
9	2002 XD40	MCA	19.8	610 m	single	3 days	14 Dec 2002	19	Disc.: LINEAR	MPC; JPL
8	2002 XF40	APO	24.9	37 m	single	3 days	12 Dec 2002	13	Disc.: LINEAR	MPC; JPL
6	2002 XO40	APO	20.7	260 m	single	49 days	29 Jan 2003	60	Disc.: LINEAR; AMO at MPC	MPC; JPL
0	2002 XJ43	MCA	19.79	330 m	multiple	2002–2021	01 Oct 2021	100	Disc.: NEAT	MPC; JPL
2	2002 XE84	APO	21.3	200 m	multiple	2002–2019	04 Dec 2019	59	Disc.: LINEAR	MPC; JPL
0	2002 XN90	MCA	18.9	490 m	multiple	1960–2020	23 Jan 2020	52	Disc.: Palomar Obs. Alt.: 4520 P-L	MPC; JPL
0	2002 XQ90	APO	22.5	110 m	multiple	2002–2019	08 Jan 2019	221	Disc.: LINEAR	MPC; JPL
7	2002 XS90	ATE	22.8	98 m	single	16 days	31 Dec 2002	17	Disc.: LINEAR	MPC; JPL
0	2002 XT90	APO	19.02	620 m	multiple	2001–2026	06 Jan 2026	177	Disc.: LINEAR	MPC; JPL
8	2002 XV90	APO	25.5	28 m	single	19 days	01 Jan 2003	16	Disc.: LINEAR	MPC; JPL
E	2002 XD91	TNO	7.6	143 km	single	1 day	05 Dec 2002	3	Disc.: Kitt Peak Obs. LoUTNOs, plutino?	MPC; JPL
4	2002 XE91	TNO	5.89	280 km	multiple	2002-2021	15 Jan 2021	56	Disc.: Kitt Peak Obs. LoUTNOs, cubewano?	MPC; JPL
E	2002 XF91	TNO	6.9	143 km	single	57 days	30 Jan 2003	5	Disc.: Kitt Peak Obs. LoUTNOs, cubewano?	MPC; JPL
E	2002 XG91	TNO	7.6	143 km	single	1 day	05 Dec 2002	3	Disc.: Kitt Peak Obs. LoUTNOs, plutino?	MPC; JPL
9	2002 XJ91	TNO	8.3	103 km	single	1 day	06 Dec 2002	3	Disc.: Kitt Peak Obs. LoUTNOs, plutino?	MPC; JPL
2	2002 XE96	MBA-O	17.0	2.2 km	multiple	2002–2020	15 Feb 2020	34	Disc.: LINEAR; Added on 11 May 2021; Alt.: 2013 TC217	MPC; JPL
0	2002 XF104	MBA-I	18.3	650 m	multiple	2002–2019	28 Nov 2019	43	Disc.: LINEAR; Alt.: 2017 BY96	MPC; JPL
1	2002 XM104	MBA-O	17.94	1.4 km	multiple	2002–2021	06 Nov 2021	33	Disc.: LINEAR	MPC; JPL
9	2002 XP114	TNO	8.7	86 km	single	1 day	05 Dec 2002	3	Disc.: Kitt Peak Obs. LoUTNOs, plutino?	MPC; JPL
0	2002 XM116	MBA-O	17.77	1.6 km	multiple	2002–2021	31 Oct 2021	29	Disc.: La Palma Obs. Added on 5 November 2021	MPC; JPL
1	2002 XO120	MBA-I	19.37	390 m	multiple	2002-2921	13 Apr 2021	41	Disc.: NEAT; Alt.: 2021 GX10	MPC; JPL
0	2002 XS122	MBA-I	18.8	520 m	multiple	2002–2018	18 Aug 2018	35	Disc.: Kitt Peak Obs.	MPC; JPL
0	2002 XB123	MBA-I	18.4	620 m	multiple	2002–2021	07 Feb 2021	37	Disc.: Kitt Peak Obs.	MPC; JPL
0	2002 XJ123	MBA-M	18.1	1.0 km	multiple	2002–2019	02 Oct 2019	62	Disc.: Kitt Peak Obs.	MPC; JPL
0	2002 XO123	MBA-I	18.7	540 m	multiple	2002–2019	02 Nov 2019	40	Disc.: Kitt Peak Obs.	MPC; JPL
1	2002 XC124	MCA	18.7	540 m	multiple	1995–2019	03 Sep 2019	58	Disc.: Kitt Peak Obs.	MPC; JPL
0	2002 XF124	MBA-I	18.7	540 m	multiple	2002–2019	05 Jul 2019	32	Disc.: Kitt Peak Obs.	MPC; JPL
2	2002 XH124	MBA-M	19.1	450 m	multiple	2002–2018	07 Aug 2018	29	Disc.: Kitt Peak Obs.	MPC; JPL
1	2002 XJ124	MBA-I	19.0	470 m	multiple	2002–2020	12 Dec 2020	26	Disc.: Kitt Peak Obs.	MPC; JPL
0	2002 XW124	MBA-M	18.08	1.0 km	multiple	1999–2021	07 Apr 2021	38	Disc.: Kitt Peak Obs. Added on 9 March 2021	MPC; JPL

back to top

== Y ==
U	Designation	Class	Physical		Observations				Description and notes	Ref
U	Designation	Class	H	D	Opp.	Arc	Last	Used	Description and notes	Ref
5	2002 YO2	AMO	22.7	100 m	single	64 days	02 Mar 2003	78	Disc.: LONEOS	MPC; JPL
0	2002 YG4	APO	24.34	56 m	multiple	2002-2026	10 Jan 2026	73	Disc.: LINEAR; AMO at MPC	MPC; JPL
9	2002 YR5	AMO	22.5	110 m	single	4 days	04 Jan 2003	39	Disc.: LINEAR	MPC; JPL
6	2002 YC12	APO	25.3	31 m	single	7 days	07 Jan 2003	42	Disc.: LINEAR	MPC; JPL
7	2002 YD12	AMO	21.7	160 m	single	30 days	30 Jan 2003	98	Disc.: LINEAR	MPC; JPL
1	2002 YK29	Asteroid	18.1	1.3 km	multiple	2002–2020	20 Dec 2020	139	Disc.: LINEAR; MCA at MPC	MPC; JPL
1	2002 YL36	MBA-M	19.0	880 m	multiple	2002–2017	03 Feb 2017	23	Disc.: La Silla Obs. Added on 22 July 2020	MPC; JPL

back to top
