= List of unnumbered minor planets: 2002 T (0–319) =

This is a partial list of unnumbered minor planets for principal provisional designations assigned during 1–15 October 2002. Since this period yielded a high number of provisional discoveries, it is further split into several standalone pages. As of March 2026, a total of 136 bodies remain unnumbered for this period. Objects for this year are listed on the following pages: A–B · C · D–F · G–K · L–O · P · Q_{i} · Q_{ii} · R_{i} · R_{ii} · S · T_{i} · T_{ii} · U–V and W–Y. Also see previous and next year.

Near-Earth obj.	MBA (inner)	MBA (outer)	Centaur
Mars-crosser	MBA (middle)	Jupiter trojan	Trans-Neptunian obj.
Unclassified

== T ==
U	Designation	Class	Physical		Observations				Description and notes	Ref
U	Designation	Class	H	D	Opp.	Arc	Last	Used	Description and notes	Ref
1	2002 TG	MCA	20.3	260 m	multiple	2002–2020	14 Aug 2020	41	Disc.: Ondřejov Obs.	MPC · JPL
3	2002 TZ8	MCA	18.31	750 m	multiple	2002-2026	17 Mar 2026	678	Disc.: LINEAR	MPC · JPL
0	2002 TW16	MBA-M	18.44	610 m	multiple	2002-2020	04 Jan 2020	34	Disc.: LINEAR	MPC · JPL
1	2002 TC22	MCA	18.0	750 m	multiple	2002–2016	28 Nov 2016	59	Disc.: LINEAR; Alt.: 2009 SQ234	MPC · JPL
1	2002 TK36	MBA-M	17.6	900 m	multiple	2002–2020	25 Jan 2020	34	Disc.: LINEAR; Alt.: 2006 UX63	MPC · JPL
1	2002 TV55	APO	21.0	220 m	single	176 days	09 Mar 2003	49	Disc.: LINEAR; AMO at MPC	MPC · JPL
0	2002 TX55	APO	23.7	65 m	multiple	2002–2012	16 Nov 2012	85	Disc.: LINEAR; Alt.: 2012 UA69	MPC · JPL
8	2002 TZ57	APO	24.6	43 m	single	7 days	10 Oct 2002	22	Disc.: LINEAR	MPC · JPL
5	2002 TA58	APO	26.8	16 m	single	4 days	07 Oct 2002	46	Disc.: LINEAR	MPC · JPL
4	2002 TD58	AMO	23.1	85 m	single	29 days	29 Oct 2002	37	Disc.: NEAT	MPC · JPL
0	2002 TE58	MCA	20.14	420 m	multiple	2002-2024	03 Dec 2024	79	Disc.: NEAT	MPC · JPL
0	2002 TG58	MCA	17.5	1.8 km	multiple	2002–2012	21 Aug 2012	119	Disc.: LINEAR	MPC · JPL
0	2002 TX58	MCA	17.2	2.0 km	multiple	2002–2019	08 Apr 2019	50	Disc.: CINEOS	MPC · JPL
0	2002 TF59	MCA	17.6	900 m	multiple	2002-2022	26 May 2022	94	Disc.: LINEAR	MPC · JPL
4	2002 TX59	AMO	23.9	59 m	multiple	2002–2021	31 Oct 2021	20	Disc.: LINEAR	MPC · JPL
5	2002 TY59	APO	25.5	28 m	single	26 days	30 Oct 2002	80	Disc.: LINEAR	MPC · JPL
9	2002 TZ59	APO	23.1	85 m	single	5 days	08 Oct 2002	28	Disc.: LINEAR	MPC · JPL
1	2002 TA60	APO	20.7	260 m	multiple	2002–2007	14 Oct 2007	53	Disc.: LINEAR	MPC · JPL
–	2002 TB60	MCA	21.3	160 m	single	39 days	13 Nov 2002	32	Disc.: LPL/Spacewatch II	MPC · JPL
1	2002 TC60	AMO	18.4	740 m	multiple	2002–2018	08 Apr 2018	66	Disc.: LINEAR	MPC · JPL
0	2002 TE60	MCA	17.8	820 m	multiple	2002–2019	18 Nov 2019	52	Disc.: NEAT; Alt.: 2014 KA76	MPC · JPL
0	2002 TM61	MBA-M	17.5	940 m	multiple	2002–2019	28 Dec 2019	42	Disc.: CINEOS	MPC · JPL
0	2002 TQ62	MBA-O	17.5	1.8 km	multiple	2002–2018	18 Oct 2018	42	Disc.: CINEOS	MPC · JPL
0	2002 TY64	MBA-M	17.6	900 m	multiple	2002–2020	19 Jan 2020	35	Disc.: NEAT	MPC · JPL
2	2002 TN65	MCA	19.02	490 m	multiple	2002-2016	01 Apr 2016	50	Disc.: NEAT	MPC · JPL
2	2002 TF66	MCA	19.7	340 m	multiple	2002–2020	24 Mar 2020	61	Disc.: LINEAR	MPC · JPL
6	2002 TG66	APO	23.9	59 m	single	10 days	15 Oct 2002	21	Disc.: NEAT	MPC · JPL
3	2002 TZ66	ATE	25.9	23 m	single	23 days	30 Oct 2002	48	Disc.: LPL/Spacewatch II	MPC · JPL
8	2002 TA67	APO	22.8	98 m	single	7 days	14 Oct 2002	43	Disc.: LPL/Spacewatch II	MPC · JPL
6	2002 TR67	AMO	22.7	100 m	single	40 days	29 Oct 2002	25	Disc.: NEAT	MPC · JPL
6	2002 TH68	AMO	21.5	180 m	single	34 days	07 Nov 2002	77	Disc.: LINEAR	MPC · JPL
2	2002 TT68	MCA	19.73	340 m	multiple	2002-2024	13 Jan 2024	22	Disc.: LPL/Spacewatch II	MPC · JPL
0	2002 TW68	MCA	18.1	710 m	multiple	2002–2025	24 Apr 2025	164	Disc.: LINEAR	MPC · JPL
0	2002 TY68	AMO	18.7	650 m	multiple	2002–2020	21 Apr 2020	206	Disc.: NEAT	MPC · JPL
7	2002 TZ68	AMO	26.4	19 m	single	4 days	13 Oct 2002	13	Disc.: LINEAR	MPC · JPL
0	2002 TA69	APO	18.2	810 m	multiple	2002–2020	16 May 2020	90	Disc.: LINEAR; NEO larger than 1 kilometer	MPC · JPL
1	2002 TB69	AMO	18.9	590 m	multiple	2002–2005	22 Nov 2005	71	Disc.: LINEAR	MPC · JPL
0	2002 TP69	AMO	21.93	150 m	multiple	2002–2022	27 Jan 2022	436	Disc.: LONEOS	MPC · JPL
0	2002 TQ69	MCA	21.27	170 m	multiple	2002–2016	19 Oct 2016	59	Disc.: NEAT	MPC · JPL
1	2002 TS69	AMO	24.4	47 m	multiple	2002–2016	24 Aug 2016	55	Disc.: LINEAR	MPC · JPL
2	2002 TB70	APO	21.6	170 m	multiple	2002–2020	06 Oct 2020	63	Disc.: NEAT; Potentially hazardous object	MPC · JPL
2	2002 TN80	MCA	19.88	430 m	multiple	2002-2026	17 Jun 2026	41	Disc.: LONEOS	MPC · JPL
2	2002 TQ87	MBA-M	18.1	710 m	multiple	2002–2014	31 May 2014	39	Disc.: LINEAR; Alt.: 2006 RM60	MPC · JPL
0	2002 TO94	MBA-I	19.0	470 m	multiple	2002–2019	29 Oct 2019	48	Disc.: LINEAR	MPC · JPL
0	2002 TK99	MBA-I	18.71	540 m	multiple	2002–2021	28 Nov 2021	56	Disc.: NEAT	MPC · JPL
0	2002 TP100	MBA-M	18.2	960 m	multiple	2002–2019	30 Nov 2019	79	Disc.: LINEAR	MPC · JPL
0	2002 TV104	MBA-M	18.7	760 m	multiple	2002–2015	10 Oct 2015	38	Disc.: LINEAR; Alt.: 2015 PA248	MPC · JPL
2	2002 TE106	MBA-M	18.5	840 m	multiple	2002–2019	06 Sep 2019	47	Disc.: LPL/Spacewatch II	MPC · JPL
–	2002 TZ106	MBA-O	18.2	1.3 km	single	22 days	06 Oct 2002	15	Disc.: LINEAR	MPC · JPL
3	2002 TL118	MCA	18.8	730 m	multiple	2002–2015	03 Dec 2015	42	Disc.: NEAT; Alt.: 2015 TW207	MPC · JPL
2	2002 TF128	MBA-M	17.9	1.5 km	multiple	2002–2020	17 Dec 2020	105	Disc.: NEAT	MPC · JPL
1	2002 TA129	MCA	18.99	470 m	multiple	2002–2021	07 Feb 2021	34	Disc.: NEAT	MPC · JPL
0	2002 TZ129	MBA-M	18.1	980 m	multiple	2002-2020	21 Mar 2020	41	Disc.: NEAT; Alt.: 2020 BG14	MPC · JPL
0	2002 TA140	MCA	18.6	570 m	multiple	2002–2019	20 Dec 2019	27	Disc.: LINEAR	MPC · JPL
2	2002 TK140	MBA-M	18.4	620 m	multiple	2002–2014	20 Sep 2014	56	Disc.: NEAT; Alt.: 2014 OA242	MPC · JPL
0	2002 TN140	MBA-I	18.6	570 m	multiple	2002–2020	17 Dec 2020	48	Disc.: NEAT; Added on 9 March 2021; Alt.: 2020 TL22	MPC · JPL
0	2002 TQ140	MBA-I	18.80	520 m	multiple	2002–2021	07 Apr 2021	42	Disc.: NEAT	MPC · JPL
0	2002 TR141	MBA-O	18.0	1.4 km	multiple	2002–2018	03 Oct 2018	31	Disc.: NEAT; Alt.: 2018 PF38	MPC · JPL
0	2002 TT141	MBA-M	18.37	680 m	multiple	2002-2023	13 Dec 2023	31	Disc.: NEAT; Alt.: 2023 VN49	MPC · JPL
0	2002 TG144	MBA-M	17.66	1.2 km	multiple	2002–2021	18 Jan 2021	156	Disc.: LINEAR	MPC · JPL
0	2002 TL150	MBA-I	19.4	390 m	multiple	2002–2021	04 Jan 2021	31	Disc.: NEAT	MPC · JPL
0	2002 TT150	MBA-O	17.8	1.5 km	multiple	2002–2018	05 Oct 2018	23	Disc.: NEAT	MPC · JPL
1	2002 TW150	MBA-M	18.3	650 m	multiple	2002–2020	04 Jan 2020	37	Disc.: NEAT	MPC · JPL
0	2002 TU151	MBA-I	18.9	490 m	multiple	2002–2017	14 Dec 2017	59	Disc.: NEAT; Alt.: 2013 RH12	MPC · JPL
0	2002 TD169	MBA-I	18.4	620 m	multiple	2002–2021	18 Jan 2021	63	Disc.: NEAT	MPC · JPL
0	2002 TQ190	MCA	18.9	490 m	multiple	2002–2020	11 Oct 2020	77	Disc.: NEAT	MPC · JPL
4	2002 TZ200	MBA-M	19.2	430 m	multiple	2002–2020	24 Jan 2020	17	Disc.: LPL/Spacewatch II; Added on 17 June 2021	MPC · JPL
0	2002 TJ201	MBA-O	17.6	1.7 km	multiple	2002–2021	18 Jan 2021	47	Disc.: LPL/Spacewatch II; Alt.: 2002 TC202, 2019 SC61	MPC · JPL
1	2002 TL201	MBA-I	19.0	470 m	multiple	2002–2020	11 Jul 2020	25	Disc.: LPL/Spacewatch II; Added on 21 August 2021	MPC · JPL
0	2002 TV209	MCA	19.21	430 m	multiple	2002–2021	28 Nov 2021	42	Disc.: AMOS	MPC · JPL
0	2002 TJ217	MBA-I	18.8	520 m	multiple	2002–2020	05 Nov 2020	47	Disc.: NEAT	MPC · JPL
0	2002 TR249	MBA-I	18.89	500 m	multiple	2002–2021	27 Sep 2021	54	Disc.: LPL/Spacewatch II	MPC · JPL
0	2002 TB274	MBA-I	18.1	710 m	multiple	2002–2021	08 Jan 2021	191	Disc.: LINEAR	MPC · JPL
0	2002 TB277	MBA-M	18.2	960 m	multiple	2002–2020	07 Dec 2020	52	Disc.: NEAT; Alt.: 2015 RX119	MPC · JPL
0	2002 TK285	MCA	17.8	1.2 km	multiple	2002–2019	02 Dec 2019	71	Disc.: LINEAR	MPC · JPL
0	2002 TO296	MCA	19.0	470 m	multiple	2002–2020	21 Jun 2020	53	Disc.: LINEAR	MPC · JPL
4	2002 TZ300	TNO	7.75	62 km	multiple	2002-2020	18 Nov 2020	86	Disc.: Mauna Kea Obs. LoUTNOs	MPC · JPL
E	2002 TA301	TNO	10.2	31 km	single	1 day	07 Oct 2002	71	Disc.: Mauna Kea Obs. LoUTNOs, cubewano?	MPC · JPL
E	2002 TB301	TNO	9.1	52 km	single	1 day	07 Oct 2002	73	Disc.: Mauna Kea Obs. LoUTNOs, cubewano?	MPC · JPL
E	2002 TC301	TNO	9.5	43 km	single	1 day	07 Oct 2002	27	Disc.: Mauna Kea Obs. LoUTNOs, cubewano?	MPC · JPL
E	2002 TD301	TNO	10.6	26 km	single	1 day	07 Oct 2002	26	Disc.: Mauna Kea Obs. LoUTNOs, cubewano?	MPC · JPL
E	2002 TE301	TNO	10.9	23 km	single	1 day	07 Oct 2002	53	Disc.: Mauna Kea Obs. LoUTNOs, cubewano?	MPC · JPL
E	2002 TF301	TNO	10.9	23 km	single	1 day	07 Oct 2002	47	Disc.: Mauna Kea Obs. LoUTNOs, cubewano?	MPC · JPL
E	2002 TG301	TNO	9.7	39 km	single	1 day	07 Oct 2002	78	Disc.: Mauna Kea Obs. LoUTNOs, cubewano?	MPC · JPL
2	2002 TH301	TNO	9.3	65 km	multiple	2002–2017	16 Dec 2017	99	Disc.: Mauna Kea Obs. LoUTNOs, plutino	MPC · JPL
E	2002 TJ301	TNO	10.9	23 km	single	1 day	07 Oct 2002	41	Disc.: Mauna Kea Obs. LoUTNOs, cubewano?	MPC · JPL
E	2002 TK301	CEN	13.4	12 km	single	1 day	07 Oct 2002	81	Disc.: Mauna Kea Obs.	MPC · JPL
E	2002 TL301	TNO	11.1	21 km	single	1 day	07 Oct 2002	30	Disc.: Mauna Kea Obs. LoUTNOs, cubewano?	MPC · JPL
E	2002 TM301	TNO	9.7	54 km	single	1 day	07 Oct 2002	92	Disc.: Mauna Kea Obs. LoUTNOs, plutino?	MPC · JPL
0	2002 TN303	MBA-I	18.94	490 m	multiple	2002-2017	23 Oct 2017	43	Disc.: NEAT; Alt.: 2006 WS215	MPC · JPL
1	2002 TQ303	MBA-M	18.3	920 m	multiple	2002–2019	28 Nov 2019	33	Disc.: SDSS	MPC · JPL
0	2002 TV303	MBA-M	18.3	920 m	multiple	2002–2019	24 Oct 2019	39	Disc.: SDSS	MPC · JPL
0	2002 TY303	MBA-I	19.23	420 m	multiple	2002–2021	01 Nov 2021	45	Disc.: SDSS	MPC · JPL
0	2002 TE304	MBA-M	17.7	1.6 km	multiple	2002–2021	05 Jan 2021	88	Disc.: SDSS	MPC · JPL
0	2002 TF304	MBA-I	19.7	340 m	multiple	2002–2018	13 Aug 2018	25	Disc.: SDSS	MPC · JPL
1	2002 TG304	MBA-M	18.7	1.0 km	multiple	2002–2020	17 Oct 2020	43	Disc.: SDSS	MPC · JPL
0	2002 TN304	MBA-M	18.00	1.4 km	multiple	2002–2022	07 Jan 2022	69	Disc.: SDSS	MPC · JPL
0	2002 TU304	MBA-I	18.90	490 m	multiple	2002–2021	09 May 2021	46	Disc.: SDSS; Alt.: 2009 WJ219	MPC · JPL
–	2002 TW304	MBA-M	18.9	490 m	single	26 days	30 Oct 2002	8	Disc.: SDSS	MPC · JPL
0	2002 TO305	MBA-M	18.1	1.3 km	multiple	2002–2020	17 Oct 2020	28	Disc.: SDSS; Alt.: 2020 RY89	MPC · JPL
–	2002 TR305	MBA-O	18.2	1.3 km	single	6 days	10 Oct 2002	6	Disc.: SDSS	MPC · JPL
2	2002 TV305	MBA-M	19.48	390 m	multiple	2002-2023	15 Dec 2023	29	Disc.: SDSS	MPC · JPL
0	2002 TX305	MBA-M	18.39	1.2 km	multiple	2002–2022	25 Jan 2022	53	Disc.: SDSS; Alt.: 2014 HC105	MPC · JPL
3	2002 TB306	MBA-I	19.6	360 m	multiple	2002–2015	08 Nov 2015	19	Disc.: SDSS; Alt.: 2015 TU184	MPC · JPL
2	2002 TG306	MBA-M	18.09	1.5 km	multiple	2002–2020	16 Aug 2020	27	Disc.: SDSS; Alt.: 2018 BT95	MPC · JPL
0	2002 TM306	MBA-I	19.1	450 m	multiple	1992–2019	31 Dec 2019	40	Disc.: SDSS	MPC · JPL
0	2002 TT306	MBA-M	18.17	1.3 km	multiple	2002–2021	28 Nov 2021	29	Disc.: SDSS	MPC · JPL
0	2002 TU306	MBA-I	18.2	680 m	multiple	2000–2020	23 Dec 2020	56	Disc.: SDSS	MPC · JPL
2	2002 TW306	MBA-I	18.73	530 m	multiple	2002–2019	10 Jan 2019	36	Disc.: SDSS	MPC · JPL
0	2002 TA307	MBA-M	18.5	840 m	multiple	2002–2019	25 Sep 2019	39	Disc.: SDSS; Added on 13 September 2020; Alt.: 2002 TA386	MPC · JPL
0	2002 TQ307	MBA-O	17.8	1.5 km	multiple	2002–2019	02 Dec 2019	20	Disc.: SDSS	MPC · JPL
2	2002 TW307	MBA-M	18.6	1.0 km	multiple	2002-2020	14 Aug 2020	14	Disc.: SDSS	MPC · JPL
1	2002 TY307	MBA-O	19.18	770 m	multiple	2002-2023	08 Nov 2023	28	Disc.: SDSS	MPC · JPL
0	2002 TL308	MBA-O	17.0	2.2 km	multiple	2002–2020	20 Dec 2020	53	Disc.: SDSS	MPC · JPL
0	2002 TN308	MBA-M	17.9	1.1 km	multiple	2002–2019	01 Jul 2019	35	Disc.: SDSS	MPC · JPL
0	2002 TV308	MBA-I	18.98	480 m	multiple	2000–2021	27 Dec 2021	51	Disc.: SDSS	MPC · JPL
1	2002 TY308	MBA-O	17.3	1.9 km	multiple	2002–2019	24 Oct 2019	49	Disc.: SDSS	MPC · JPL
1	2002 TG309	MBA-O	17.75	1.6 km	multiple	2002–2019	08 Jan 2019	24	Disc.: SDSS; Added on 24 December 2021	MPC · JPL
1	2002 TP309	MBA-O	17.97	1.4 km	multiple	2002–2021	10 Sep 2021	39	Disc.: SDSS; Added on 21 August 2021; Alt.: 2021 NS11	MPC · JPL
0	2002 TJ310	MBA-I	18.99	470 m	multiple	2002–2021	08 Sep 2021	38	Disc.: SDSS; Added on 22 July 2020; Alt.: 2015 US42	MPC · JPL
–	2002 TS311	MBA-M	19.4	390 m	single	7 days	11 Oct 2002	6	Disc.: SDSS	MPC · JPL
0	2002 TH312	MBA-I	19.3	410 m	multiple	2002–2019	02 Nov 2019	26	Disc.: SDSS	MPC · JPL
0	2002 TL312	MBA-M	18.06	1.4 km	multiple	2002–2022	27 Jan 2022	41	Disc.: SDSS	MPC · JPL
0	2002 TU312	MBA-O	17.7	1.6 km	multiple	2002–2017	12 Sep 2017	19	Disc.: SDSS; Alt.: 2007 RW261	MPC · JPL
1	2002 TB313	MBA-M	17.9	1.5 km	multiple	2002–2020	17 Nov 2020	36	Disc.: SDSS; Added on 17 January 2021; Alt.: 2015 PW154	MPC · JPL
0	2002 TP313	MBA-O	16.7	2.5 km	multiple	2002–2020	23 Jan 2020	65	Disc.: SDSS; Alt.: 2014 WD418	MPC · JPL
2	2002 TQ313	MBA-M	18.1	1.0 km	multiple	2002–2021	16 Jan 2021	31	Disc.: SDSS; Added on 9 March 2021	MPC · JPL
0	2002 TS313	MBA-I	18.58	570 m	multiple	2002–2021	10 May 2021	56	Disc.: SDSS; Added on 22 July 2020	MPC · JPL
0	2002 TB315	MBA-M	18.18	1.0 km	multiple	2002-2021	11 Apr 2021	19	Disc.: SDSS	MPC · JPL
0	2002 TJ315	MBA-O	17.4	1.8 km	multiple	2002–2019	28 Nov 2019	28	Disc.: SDSS	MPC · JPL
0	2002 TR315	MCA	19.7	340 m	multiple	2002–2018	04 Dec 2018	33	Disc.: SDSS; Added on 11 May 2021; Alt.: 2018 WR2	MPC · JPL
0	2002 TA316	MCA	19.44	410 m	multiple	2002–2025	22 Jun 2025	35	Disc.: SDSS	MPC · JPL
0	2002 TD316	MBA-M	17.8	1.2 km	multiple	2002–2019	24 Sep 2019	53	Disc.: SDSS	MPC · JPL
0	2002 TU316	MBA-M	17.7	1.2 km	multiple	2002–2019	01 Nov 2019	105	Disc.: SDSS; Alt.: 2015 UE80	MPC · JPL
0	2002 TY319	MBA-O	17.2	2.0 km	multiple	2002–2021	15 Jan 2021	59	Disc.: SDSS	MPC · JPL

back to top
