= List of unnumbered minor planets: 2002 D–F =

This is a partial list of unnumbered minor planets for principal provisional designations assigned between 16 February and 31 March 2002. As of March 2026, a total of 91 bodies remain unnumbered for this period. Objects for this year are listed on the following pages: A–B · C · D–F · G–K · L–O · P · Q_{i} · Q_{ii} · R_{i} · R_{ii} · S · T_{i} · T_{ii} · U–V and W–Y. Also see previous and next year.

Near-Earth obj.	MBA (inner)	MBA (outer)	Centaur
Mars-crosser	MBA (middle)	Jupiter trojan	Trans-Neptunian obj.
Unclassified

== D ==
U	Designation	Class	Physical		Observations				Description and notes	Ref
U	Designation	Class	H	D	Opp.	Arc	Last	Used	Description and notes	Ref
1	2002 DH_{2}	APO	20.3	310 m	multiple	2002–2005	14 Feb 2005	165	Disc.: LONEOS	MPC · JPL
8	2002 DC3	APO	26.1	21 m	single	48 days	09 Apr 2002	13	Disc.: LINEAR; AMO at MPC	MPC · JPL
6	2002 DO3	APO	22.0	140 m	single	34 days	27 Mar 2002	79	Disc.: LINEAR; Potentially hazardous object	MPC · JPL
5	2002 DQ3	AMO	23.8	62 m	single	60 days	23 Apr 2002	65	Disc.: NEAT	MPC · JPL
3	2002 DQ4	MBA-O	17.8	1.5 km	multiple	2002–2017	25 Apr 2017	20	Disc.: Cerro Tololo; Added on 22 July 2020	MPC · JPL
0	2002 DU21	HUN	18.8	520 m	multiple	2002–2020	02 Dec 2020	49	Disc.: Spacewatch	MPC · JPL

back to top

== E ==
U	Designation	Class	Physical		Observations				Description and notes	Ref
U	Designation	Class	H	D	Opp.	Arc	Last	Used	Description and notes	Ref
8	2002 EA	APO	22.4	120 m	single	9 days	11 Mar 2002	113	Disc.: Pla D'Arguines Obs.	MPC · JPL
6	2002 EC	AMO	23.4	74 m	single	50 days	23 Apr 2002	159	Disc.: NEAT	MPC · JPL
5	2002 EV	AMO	23.2	81 m	single	58 days	02 May 2002	54	Disc.: LINEAR	MPC · JPL
2	2002 EW	APO	20.7	260 m	multiple	2002–2006	09 Mar 2006	108	Disc.: LINEAR	MPC · JPL
0	2002 EY	APO	20.15	350 m	multiple	2002-2023	21 Aug 2023	89	Disc.: NEAT	MPC · JPL
1	2002 EH1	AMO	19.65	420 m	multiple	2002–2022	27 Jan 2022	41	Disc.: NEAT	MPC · JPL
0	2002 EG2	MBA-M	17.69	1.6 km	multiple	2002–2021	15 May 2021	105	Disc.: Bohyunsan Obs. Alt.: 2016 EU74	MPC · JPL
0	2002 EC3	APO	21.3	200 m	multiple	2002–2018	20 Oct 2018	91	Disc.: LINEAR	MPC · JPL
0	2002 ET5	MCA	19.5	700 m	multiple	2002–2016	10 Aug 2016	47	Disc.: AMOS	MPC · JPL
0	2002 EG6	HUN	19.25	420 m	multiple	2002–2021	30 Sep 2021	113	Disc.: NEAT; Alt.: 2016 TM69	MPC · JPL
7	2002 EM7	ATE	24.4	47 m	single	25 days	06 Apr 2002	69	Disc.: LINEAR	MPC · JPL
1	2002 EN7	APO	21.2	200 m	multiple	2002–2016	01 Apr 2016	47	Disc.: NEAT	MPC · JPL
0	2002 EW8	APO	23.84	61 m	multiple	2002–2007	21 Mar 2007	110	Disc.: LINEAR	MPC · JPL
0	2002 EX8	APO	20.8	250 m	multiple	2002–2015	18 Sep 2015	219	Disc.: LINEAR	MPC · JPL
5	2002 ES11	AMO	21.9	150 m	single	87 days	08 Jun 2002	28	Disc.: Spacewatch	MPC · JPL
1	2002 ET11	AMO	20.2	320 m	multiple	2002–2017	14 Sep 2017	47	Disc.: Spacewatch	MPC · JPL
6	2002 EU11	APO	21.9	150 m	single	13 days	26 Mar 2002	71	Disc.: NEAT; Potentially hazardous object	MPC · JPL
3	2002 EV11	APO	20.0	360 m	multiple	2002–2014	20 Apr 2014	78	Disc.: NEAT; Potentially hazardous object	MPC · JPL
7	2002 EW11	APO	24.8	39 m	single	10 days	22 Mar 2002	43	Disc.: NEAT	MPC · JPL
5	2002 EY11	AMO	22.2	130 m	single	35 days	18 Apr 2002	36	Disc.: NEAT	MPC · JPL
0	2002 EG17	MBA-M	18.61	800 m	multiple	2002–2021	29 Sep 2021	27	Disc.: Spacewatch	MPC · JPL
0	2002 EB36	MBA-O	17.2	2.0 km	multiple	2002–2019	04 Apr 2019	22	Disc.: Spacewatch; Added on 24 December 2021	MPC · JPL
2	2002 ED36	MBA-M	18.74	760 m	multiple	2002–2023	16 Mar 2023	42	Disc.: Spacewatch; Added on 17 January 2021	MPC · JPL
2	2002 EQ36	MBA-I	19.1	450 m	multiple	2002–2017	17 May 2017	23	Disc.: Spacewatch	MPC · JPL
1	2002 EC37	MBA-M	18.4	1.2 km	multiple	2002–2020	29 Apr 2020	44	Disc.: Spacewatch; Alt.: 2015 BJ225	MPC · JPL
2	2002 EJ46	MCA	17.7	1.6 km	multiple	2002–2017	21 Feb 2017	47	Disc.: NEAT	MPC · JPL
0	2002 EG116	AMO	21.66	170 m	multiple	2002-2022	03 Aug 2022	37	Disc.: NEAT	MPC · JPL
1	2002 EW117	MBA-M	17.5	940 m	multiple	2002–2020	13 Sep 2020	26	Disc.: Spacewatch	MPC · JPL
0	2002 EG121	HUN	19.07	460 m	multiple	2002–2021	03 Dec 2021	50	Disc.: Spacewatch	MPC · JPL
1	2002 EC131	MBA-M	18.52	590 m	multiple	2002–2022	04 Jan 2022	39	Disc.: NEAT; Alt.: 2013 YN85	MPC · JPL
–	2002 EZ150	MBA-M	16.8	1.3 km	single	20 days	04 Apr 2002	12	Disc.: NEAT	MPC · JPL
0	2002 EN156	MBA-M	18.2	960 m	multiple	2002–2016	03 Aug 2016	32	Disc.: ADAS; Alt.: 2015 EZ44	MPC · JPL
0	2002 ES157	MBA-M	17.93	1.4 km	multiple	2002–2021	30 Jul 2021	64	Disc.: NEAT	MPC · JPL
0	2002 EZ158	MBA-M	18.3	650 m	multiple	2002–2019	10 Jun 2019	26	Disc.: SDSS; Added on 22 July 2020	MPC · JPL
1	2002 EP159	MBA-M	18.54	820 m	multiple	2002–2020	17 Jul 2020	16	Disc.: SDSS; Added on 29 January 2022	MPC · JPL
0	2002 EH160	HUN	19.2	430 m	multiple	2002–2020	19 Apr 2020	24	Disc.: NEAT; Added on 30 September 2021	MPC · JPL
0	2002 EB169	MBA-M	17.8	1.5 km	multiple	2002–2021	09 Jun 2021	29	Disc.: LPL/Spacewatch II	MPC · JPL
0	2002 EE170	MBA-I	18.7	540 m	multiple	2002–2019	28 Nov 2019	46	Disc.: Spacewatch	MPC · JPL
0	2002 EM170	MBA-I	18.55	580 m	multiple	2002–2021	14 Apr 2021	55	Disc.: SDSS	MPC · JPL
0	2002 EP170	HUN	19.1	450 m	multiple	2002–2019	27 Sep 2019	29	Disc.: SDSS	MPC · JPL
1	2002 EQ170	MBA-M	18.4	880 m	multiple	2002–2019	10 Mar 2019	26	Disc.: NEAT	MPC · JPL
1	2002 ER170	MBA-M	18.5	840 m	multiple	2002–2019	08 Feb 2019	28	Disc.: SDSS	MPC · JPL
0	2002 EE171	MBA-I	18.75	530 m	multiple	2002–2021	10 Apr 2021	41	Disc.: SDSS	MPC · JPL
0	2002 EN171	MBA-O	17.5	1.8 km	multiple	2002–2019	31 May 2019	21	Disc.: SDSS	MPC · JPL
0	2002 EZ171	MBA-O	17.4	1.8 km	multiple	2002–2019	05 May 2019	30	Disc.: SDSS	MPC · JPL
0	2002 EB172	MBA-I	18.9	490 m	multiple	2002–2020	15 Feb 2020	55	Disc.: LPL/Spacewatch II	MPC · JPL
0	2002 EF172	MBA-I	18.18	690 m	multiple	2002–2021	09 May 2021	50	Disc.: SDSS	MPC · JPL
0	2002 EG172	MBA-I	18.9	490 m	multiple	2002–2020	14 Feb 2020	38	Disc.: Spacewatch	MPC · JPL
0	2002 EH172	MBA-I	18.9	490 m	multiple	2002–2020	15 Feb 2020	43	Disc.: SDSS	MPC · JPL
0	2002 ER172	MBA-I	18.72	540 m	multiple	1995–2021	26 Oct 2021	42	Disc.: Spacewatch; Added on 9 March 2021	MPC · JPL
0	2002 ET172	MBA-I	18.9	490 m	multiple	2002–2021	19 Apr 2021	46	Disc.: Spacewatch; Added on 17 June 2021	MPC · JPL
0	2002 EW172	MBA-M	18.57	810 m	multiple	2002–2021	05 Oct 2021	25	Disc.: SDSS; Added on 21 August 2021	MPC · JPL

back to top

== F ==
U	Designation	Class	Physical		Observations				Description and notes	Ref
U	Designation	Class	H	D	Opp.	Arc	Last	Used	Description and notes	Ref
7	2002 FB	APO	26.6	17 m	single	2 days	18 Mar 2002	21	Disc.: LINEAR	MPC · JPL
7	2002 FW1	ATE	24.0	56 m	single	21 days	09 Apr 2002	14	Disc.: NEAT	MPC · JPL
0	2002 FP5	AMO	21.41	170 m	multiple	2002-2025	01 Mar 2025	71	Disc.: NEAT	MPC · JPL
0	2002 FQ5	APO	20.64	270 m	multiple	2002–2010	10 Apr 2010	79	Disc.: LONEOS; Potentially hazardous object	MPC · JPL
–	2002 FR5	MCA	20.1	530 m	single	13 days	02 Apr 2002	24	Disc.: NEAT	MPC · JPL
0	2002 FT5	ATE	21.58	170 m	multiple	2002–2021	14 Apr 2021	82	Disc.: LINEAR	MPC · JPL
4	2002 FU5	APO	21.0	220 m	single	34 days	14 Apr 2002	69	Disc.: NEAT	MPC · JPL
8	2002 FS6	APO	24.8	39 m	single	5 days	26 Mar 2002	10	Disc.: LINEAR; AMO at MPC	MPC · JPL
3	2002 FV6	TNO	6.8	145 km	multiple	2002–2015	18 Feb 2015	19	Disc.: Mauna Kea Obs. LoUTNOs, cubewano (cold)	MPC · JPL
E	2002 FX6	TNO	6.9	173 km	single	19 days	08 Apr 2002	6	Disc.: Mauna Kea Obs. LoUTNOs, other TNO	MPC · JPL
0	2002 FO7	APO	20.17	330 m	multiple	2002–2021	18 Apr 2021	40	Disc.: Spacewatch; Added on 11 May 2021; Alt.: 2021 FQ1	MPC · JPL
E	2002 FP7	TNO	8.5	94 km	single	15 days	06 Apr 2002	5	Disc.: Mauna Kea Obs. LoUTNOs, plutino?	MPC · JPL
1	2002 FT17	MBA-O	17.9	1.5 km	multiple	2002–2019	28 May 2019	21	Disc.: Kitt Peak Obs. Added on 17 January 2021	MPC · JPL
3	2002 FZ17	MBA-M	18.32	910 m	multiple	2002–2017	16 Oct 2017	22	Disc.: Kitt Peak Obs.	MPC · JPL
0	2002 FV18	JT	15.32	5.6 km	multiple	2002-2025	20 Jan 2025	28	Disc.: Kitt Peak Obs. Greek camp (L4)	MPC · JPL
0	2002 FF19	MBA-I	19.56	360 m	multiple	2002–2021	31 Oct 2021	46	Disc.: Kitt Peak Obs. Alt.: 2016 FG27	MPC · JPL
0	2002 FK19	MBA-O	17.3	1.9 km	multiple	2002–2020	13 Sep 2020	40	Disc.: Kitt Peak Obs.	MPC · JPL
4	2002 FW36	TNO	6.9	139 km	multiple	2002–2015	23 Mar 2015	21	Disc.: Kitt Peak Obs. LoUTNOs, cubewano (cold)	MPC · JPL
4	2002 FX36	TNO	6.28	183 km	multiple	2002–2021	15 Feb 2021	34	Disc.: Kitt Peak Obs. LoUTNOs, cubewano (cold)	MPC · JPL
3	2002 FY36	TNO	8.55	109 km	multiple	2001–2019	18 Aug 2019	37	Disc.: Kitt Peak Obs. LoUTNOs, centaur	MPC · JPL
2	2002 FH42	MBA-I	18.8	520 m	multiple	2002–2016	03 Apr 2016	56	Disc.: Spacewatch	MPC · JPL
0	2002 FV42	MBA-M	17.4	1.8 km	multiple	2002–2017	17 Oct 2017	43	Disc.: Kitt Peak Obs.	MPC · JPL
0	2002 FW42	MBA-I	18.9	490 m	multiple	2002–2021	04 Jan 2021	43	Disc.: Kitt Peak Obs.	MPC · JPL
0	2002 FA43	MBA-O	17.87	1.5 km	multiple	2002–2021	27 Nov 2021	77	Disc.: LPL/Spacewatch II	MPC · JPL
0	2002 FJ43	MBA-O	17.2	2.0 km	multiple	2002–2020	23 Oct 2020	43	Disc.: Kitt Peak Obs.	MPC · JPL
0	2002 FX43	MBA-M	18.0	750 m	multiple	2002–2020	13 Sep 2020	37	Disc.: Kitt Peak Obs.	MPC · JPL
0	2002 FY43	MBA-O	17.3	1.9 km	multiple	2002–2020	10 Dec 2020	30	Disc.: Kitt Peak Obs.	MPC · JPL
1	2002 FZ43	MBA-O	17.8	1.5 km	multiple	2002–2019	01 Nov 2019	40	Disc.: Kitt Peak Obs.	MPC · JPL
0	2002 FD44	MBA-I	18.8	520 m	multiple	2002–2016	04 Oct 2016	44	Disc.: Kitt Peak Obs.	MPC · JPL
0	2002 FG44	MBA-I	19.07	460 m	multiple	2002–2021	10 Aug 2021	36	Disc.: Spacewatch; Added on 22 July 2020	MPC · JPL
0	2002 FM44	MBA-I	18.85	500 m	multiple	2002–2021	11 May 2021	46	Disc.: LPL/Spacewatch II; Added on 11 May 2021	MPC · JPL
0	2002 FN44	MBA-I	18.53	580 m	multiple	2002–2021	20 Mar 2021	33	Disc.: Kitt Peak Obs. Added on 17 June 2021	MPC · JPL

back to top
