= List of unnumbered minor planets: 2002 U–V =

This is a partial list of unnumbered minor planets for principal provisional designations assigned between 16 October and 15 November 2002. As of March 2026, a total of 156 bodies remain unnumbered for this period. Objects for this year are listed on the following pages: A–B · C · D–F · G–K · L–O · P · Q_{i} · Q_{ii} · R_{i} · R_{ii} · S · T_{i} · T_{ii} · U–V and W–Y. Also see previous and next year.

Near-Earth obj.	MBA (inner)	MBA (outer)	Centaur
Mars-crosser	MBA (middle)	Jupiter trojan	Trans-Neptunian obj.
Unclassified

== U ==
U	Designation	Class	Physical		Observations				Description and notes	Ref
U	Designation	Class	H	D	Opp.	Arc	Last	Used	Description and notes	Ref
0	2002 UT3	MBA-M	18.7	540 m	multiple	2002-2017	06 Mar 2017	34	Disc.: NEAT; Alt.: 2015 TG164	MPC · JPL
1	2002 UC4	MBA-O	18.39	1.2 km	multiple	2002-2023	18 Dec 2023	31	Disc.: Tenagra II Obs.	MPC · JPL
0	2002 UP4	MCA	18.32	910 m	multiple	2002–2019	24 Dec 2019	52	Disc.: NEAT	MPC · JPL
5	2002 UL11	AMO	21.1	210 m	single	57 days	01 Dec 2002	46	Disc.: NEAT	MPC · JPL
0	2002 US11	HUN	19.27	420 m	multiple	2002–2020	09 Nov 2020	32	Disc.: Tenagra II Obs.	MPC · JPL
1	2002 UJ12	MCA	18.36	680 m	multiple	2002-2024	10 Apr 2024	38	Disc.: LINEAR	MPC · JPL
0	2002 UQ12	APO	22.2	130 m	multiple	2002–2016	03 Nov 2016	130	Disc.: LINEAR; Alt.: 2009 UH14	MPC · JPL
0	2002 UA21	MBA-I	18.15	700 m	multiple	2002–2021	15 Apr 2021	110	Disc.: Kvistaberg Obs.	MPC · JPL
0	2002 UK30	MBA-O	17.34	1.9 km	multiple	2002–2021	11 Sep 2021	49	Disc.: LPL/Spacewatch II; Added on 21 August 2021	MPC · JPL
7	2002 UV36	APO	26.5	18 m	single	14 days	14 Nov 2002	31	Disc.: LPL/Spacewatch II	MPC · JPL
1	2002 UE38	HUN	18.8	520 m	multiple	2002–2021	16 Jan 2021	37	Disc.: La Palma Obs. Added on 17 January 2021	MPC · JPL
0	2002 UX43	MBA-O	16.88	2.3 km	multiple	2002–2021	11 May 2021	112	Disc.: LPL/Spacewatch II	MPC · JPL
0	2002 UJ44	MBA-M	17.8	1.2 km	multiple	2002–2019	24 Dec 2019	51	Disc.: La Palma Obs. Alt.: 2002 VR148	MPC · JPL
0	2002 UM52	MBA-O	17.8	1.5 km	multiple	2002–2021	04 Oct 2021	28	Disc.: SDSS; Added on 5 November 2021	MPC · JPL
0	2002 UU52	MBA-O	16.7	2.5 km	multiple	2002–2019	04 Jan 2019	30	Disc.: SDSS; Alt.: 2013 YU137	MPC · JPL
0	2002 UW52	MBA-I	18.98	480 m	multiple	2002–2021	07 Feb 2021	32	Disc.: SDSS	MPC · JPL
2	2002 UZ52	MBA-M	19.1	450 m	multiple	2002–2018	08 Aug 2018	18	Disc.: SDSS; Added on 21 August 2021	MPC · JPL
0	2002 UA53	MBA-I	18.59	570 m	multiple	2002–2021	15 Apr 2021	45	Disc.: SDSS; Added on 22 July 2020	MPC · JPL
0	2002 UH53	MBA-O	17.3	1.9 km	multiple	2002–2019	28 Sep 2019	28	Disc.: SDSS	MPC · JPL
0	2002 UU53	MBA-I	18.8	520 m	multiple	2002–2019	25 Jul 2019	69	Disc.: SDSS; Alt.: 2016 UG7	MPC · JPL
0	2002 UC54	MBA-I	18.7	540 m	multiple	2002–2019	09 Apr 2019	40	Disc.: SDSS; Added on 22 July 2020	MPC · JPL
0	2002 UQ54	MBA-M	17.9	1.1 km	multiple	2002–2019	02 Nov 2019	29	Disc.: SDSS; Added on 22 July 2020; Alt.: 2018 KT4	MPC · JPL
0	2002 UT54	MBA-M	17.90	1.5 km	multiple	2002–2021	10 Nov 2021	38	Disc.: SDSS; Alt.: 2007 UV157	MPC · JPL
0	2002 UY54	MBA-O	17.70	1.6 km	multiple	2002–2021	05 Jul 2021	63	Disc.: SDSS; Alt.: 2012 TM92	MPC · JPL
0	2002 UU55	MBA-O	16.6	2.7 km	multiple	2002–2020	01 Jan 2020	33	Disc.: SDSS	MPC · JPL
1	2002 UE56	MBA-M	19.09	470 m	multiple	2002-2023	09 Dec 2023	41	Disc.: SDSS	MPC · JPL
0	2002 UH56	MBA-M	18.3	650 m	multiple	2001–2020	03 Jan 2020	30	Disc.: SDSS	MPC · JPL
0	2002 UN56	MBA-O	17.6	1.7 km	multiple	2002–2019	04 Dec 2019	32	Disc.: SDSS	MPC · JPL
0	2002 UR56	MBA-M	17.88	1.1 km	multiple	2002–2020	05 Dec 2020	23	Disc.: SDSS; Added on 17 June 2021; Alt.: 2020 VC23	MPC · JPL
1	2002 UT56	MBA-M	18.2	680 m	multiple	2002–2014	01 Sep 2014	41	Disc.: SDSS; Alt.: 2014 QZ54	MPC · JPL
0	2002 UU56	MBA-O	16.7	2.5 km	multiple	2002–2021	18 Jan 2021	51	Disc.: SDSS	MPC · JPL
1	2002 UV56	MBA-M	19.4	730 m	multiple	2002–2020	21 Oct 2020	112	Disc.: SDSS	MPC · JPL
1	2002 UP57	MBA-O	17.54	1.7 km	multiple	2002–2021	09 Aug 2021	49	Disc.: SDSS	MPC · JPL
0	2002 UW57	MBA-O	17.54	1.7 km	multiple	2002-2022	15 Sep 2022	29	Disc.: SDSS	MPC · JPL
1	2002 UZ57	MBA-O	18.07	1.4 km	multiple	2002–2017	20 Nov 2017	35	Disc.: SDSS; Added on 22 July 2020	MPC · JPL
0	2002 UE58	MBA-O	17.5	1.8 km	multiple	2002–2019	26 Nov 2019	28	Disc.: SDSS	MPC · JPL
2	2002 UM58	MBA-O	18.3	1.2 km	multiple	2002–2012	20 Nov 2012	20	Disc.: SDSS	MPC · JPL
1	2002 UW59	MBA-M	18.2	1.3 km	multiple	2002–2020	23 Sep 2020	49	Disc.: SDSS; Alt.: 2011 SR251	MPC · JPL
1	2002 UX59	MBA-M	18.9	490 m	multiple	2002–2020	27 Jan 2020	36	Disc.: SDSS; Added on 22 July 2020	MPC · JPL
1	2002 UM60	MBA-M	18.70	1.0 km	multiple	2002–2020	06 Dec 2020	17	Disc.: SDSS	MPC · JPL
0	2002 UZ60	MBA-M	17.5	1.3 km	multiple	2002–2020	19 Jan 2020	35	Disc.: SDSS; Added on 11 May 2021; Alt.: 2019 TA56	MPC · JPL
0	2002 UP61	MBA-I	18.4	620 m	multiple	2002–2020	15 Dec 2020	109	Disc.: SDSS; Added on 19 October 2020	MPC · JPL
0	2002 UM62	MBA-O	17.1	2.1 km	multiple	2002–2018	05 Oct 2018	26	Disc.: SDSS	MPC · JPL
0	2002 UV62	MBA-M	17.9	1.5 km	multiple	2002–2020	06 Dec 2020	53	Disc.: SDSS; Added on 19 October 2020	MPC · JPL
0	2002 UL63	MBA-M	19.6	360 m	multiple	2002–2019	28 Dec 2019	24	Disc.: SDSS; Added on 22 July 2020	MPC · JPL
0	2002 UQ63	MBA-I	19.4	390 m	multiple	2002–2019	27 Oct 2019	51	Disc.: SDSS	MPC · JPL
3	2002 UV63	MBA-O	17.9	1.5 km	multiple	2002–2019	25 Oct 2019	36	Disc.: SDSS; Added on 22 July 2020; Alt.: 2019 QO19	MPC · JPL
0	2002 UK64	MBA-I	19.13	440 m	multiple	2002–2022	25 Jan 2022	41	Disc.: SDSS; Added on 22 July 2020	MPC · JPL
0	2002 US64	HUN	18.7	540 m	multiple	2002–2020	17 Nov 2020	55	Disc.: SDSS; Added on 17 January 2021	MPC · JPL
0	2002 UV64	MBA-M	17.98	750 m	multiple	2002–2021	09 Apr 2021	22	Disc.: SDSS	MPC · JPL
0	2002 UB65	MBA-M	18.3	920 m	multiple	2002–2019	05 Nov 2019	50	Disc.: SDSS	MPC · JPL
0	2002 UQ65	MBA-M	17.8	1.2 km	multiple	2002–2021	07 Jan 2021	58	Disc.: SDSS; Alt.: 2015 UU39	MPC · JPL
0	2002 UT65	MBA-O	16.9	2.3 km	multiple	2002–2018	09 Nov 2018	27	Disc.: SDSS; Added on 19 October 2020	MPC · JPL
1	2002 UK66	MBA-O	17.8	1.5 km	multiple	2002–2018	18 Oct 2018	19	Disc.: SDSS; Added on 21 August 2021	MPC · JPL
2	2002 UF67	MBA-I	19.0	470 m	multiple	2002–2021	07 Feb 2021	30	Disc.: SDSS; Added on 11 May 2021	MPC · JPL
–	2002 UL67	MCA	20.4	250 m	single	22 days	31 Oct 2002	8	Disc.: SDSS	MPC · JPL
0	2002 UO67	MBA-M	17.78	1.5 km	multiple	2002–2022	25 Jan 2022	57	Disc.: SDSS	MPC · JPL
2	2002 UB68	MBA-M	18.8	520 m	multiple	2002–2018	01 Nov 2018	25	Disc.: SDSS; Added on 21 August 2021	MPC · JPL
0	2002 UH68	MBA-M	18.5	840 m	multiple	2002–2019	27 Oct 2019	49	Disc.: SDSS; Added on 22 July 2020; Alt.: 2019 QE30	MPC · JPL
1	2002 UK68	MBA-M	18.38	1.1 km	multiple	2002-2024	01 Nov 2024	44	Disc.: SDSS	MPC · JPL
0	2002 UM68	MBA-I	19.20	430 m	multiple	2002–2021	06 Oct 2021	182	Disc.: SDSS; Alt.: 2015 BD479	MPC · JPL
2	2002 UW68	MBA-M	18.4	1.2 km	multiple	2002–2020	17 Sep 2020	23	Disc.: SDSS; Added on 17 January 2021	MPC · JPL
1	2002 UZ68	MBA-M	19.1	640 m	multiple	2002–2019	25 Sep 2019	337	Disc.: SDSS; Added on 19 October 2020; Alt.: 2015 XE23	MPC · JPL
0	2002 UC69	MBA-M	18.16	1.3 km	multiple	2002–2022	06 Jan 2022	25	Disc.: SDSS	MPC · JPL
1	2002 UE69	HUN	18.6	570 m	multiple	2002–2020	27 Jan 2020	25	Disc.: SDSS; Added on 17 January 2021; Alt.: 2015 FA425	MPC · JPL
0	2002 UF69	MBA-O	17.4	1.8 km	multiple	2002–2021	07 Jan 2021	29	Disc.: SDSS	MPC · JPL
0	2002 UG69	MBA-I	18.7	540 m	multiple	2002–2020	16 Nov 2020	63	Disc.: SDSS	MPC · JPL
0	2002 UP69	MBA-O	17.60	1.7 km	multiple	2002–2020	17 Apr 2020	47	Disc.: SDSS; Added on 21 August 2021	MPC · JPL
–	2002 UK73	MBA-I	19.3	410 m	single	5 days	03 Nov 2002	9	Disc.: NEAT	MPC · JPL
1	2002 UW73	MBA-I	19.1	450 m	multiple	2002–2020	21 Jan 2020	36	Disc.: NEAT	MPC · JPL
1	2002 UX73	MBA-I	19.91	310 m	multiple	2002–2020	16 Nov 2020	38	Disc.: NEAT; Added on 17 January 2021	MPC · JPL
1	2002 UY73	MBA-I	19.2	430 m	multiple	1995–2020	24 Dec 2020	42	Disc.: Spacewatch; Alt.: 1995 VT5, 2009 SS142	MPC · JPL
0	2002 UF74	MBA-I	18.8	520 m	multiple	2002–2017	25 Dec 2017	28	Disc.: NEAT	MPC · JPL
1	2002 UX75	MBA-O	17.9	1.5 km	multiple	2002–2019	08 Jan 2019	38	Disc.: NEAT	MPC · JPL
–	2002 UV76	MBA-M	17.3	1.9 km	single	41 days	10 Dec 2002	11	Disc.: AMOS	MPC · JPL
1	2002 US77	MBA-O	16.7	2.5 km	multiple	2002–2020	11 Dec 2020	35	Disc.: NEAT; Alt.: 2008 UK70	MPC · JPL
0	2002 UH78	MBA-M	18.1	1.0 km	multiple	2002–2020	27 Jan 2020	45	Disc.: NEAT	MPC · JPL
0	2002 UK80	MBA-M	18.38	1.2 km	multiple	2002-2025	10 Dec 2025	87	Disc.: NEAT	MPC · JPL
0	2002 UD81	MBA-I	18.82	510 m	multiple	2002–2021	08 Dec 2021	54	Disc.: NEAT	MPC · JPL
0	2002 UZ81	MBA-O	17.0	2.2 km	multiple	2002–2021	12 Jan 2021	37	Disc.: LPL/Spacewatch II	MPC · JPL
0	2002 UA82	MBA-I	18.4	620 m	multiple	2002–2019	23 Sep 2019	34	Disc.: NEAT	MPC · JPL
0	2002 UK82	MBA-I	18.5	590 m	multiple	2002–2020	12 Dec 2020	45	Disc.: NEAT; Added on 9 March 2021	MPC · JPL

back to top

== V ==
U	Designation	Class	Physical		Observations				Description and notes	Ref
U	Designation	Class	H	D	Opp.	Arc	Last	Used	Description and notes	Ref
2	2002 VS	MBA-I	18.18	650 m	multiple	2002-2018	12 Jul 2018	40	Disc.: Table Mountain Obs.	MPC · JPL
0	2002 VM1	MBA-O	18.6	1.1 km	multiple	2002–2018	29 Nov 2018	40	Disc.: La Palma Obs. Alt.: 2007 RF71	MPC · JPL
E	2002 VO1	MBA-O	19.0	880 m	single	3 days	04 Nov 2002	12	Disc.: La Palma Obs.	MPC · JPL
5	2002 VV1	MBA-I	20.68	250 m	multiple	2002-2025	20 Jul 2025	14	Disc.: La Palma Obs.	MPC · JPL
1	2002 VF2	MBA-O	17.8	1.5 km	multiple	2002–2017	21 Sep 2017	41	Disc.: AMOS	MPC · JPL
3	2002 VY2	MBA-M	18.2	960 m	multiple	2002–2019	26 Nov 2019	40	Disc.: Table Mountain Obs.	MPC · JPL
6	2002 VQ14	AMO	21.1	210 m	single	38 days	13 Dec 2002	69	Disc.: LINEAR	MPC · JPL
6	2002 VR14	APO	22.4	120 m	single	39 days	12 Nov 2002	34	Disc.: NEAT	MPC · JPL
4	2002 VS14	APO	21.8	160 m	multiple	2002–2006	24 Nov 2006	72	Disc.: LONEOS	MPC · JPL
7	2002 VU17	APO	24.9	37 m	single	29 days	05 Dec 2002	51	Disc.: LINEAR	MPC · JPL
–	2002 VW17	MCA	20.1	280 m	single	2 days	09 Nov 2002	13	Disc.: LPL/Spacewatch II	MPC · JPL
5	2002 VX17	AMO	22.1	140 m	single	84 days	27 Dec 2002	82	Disc.: LINEAR	MPC · JPL
7	2002 VO69	APO	22.9	93 m	single	9 days	14 Nov 2002	29	Disc.: LINEAR	MPC · JPL
0	2002 VQ69	MCA	19.37	580 m	multiple	2002-2025	04 Feb 2025	100	Disc.: LONEOS	MPC · JPL
0	2002 VO85	AMO	21.8	150 m	multiple	2002–2020	15 Jun 2020	62	Disc.: LINEAR	MPC · JPL
2	2002 VP85	AMO	20.0	360 m	multiple	2002–2020	10 Dec 2020	69	Disc.: LONEOS	MPC · JPL
0	2002 VR85	APO	20.3	310 m	multiple	2002–2020	26 Jun 2020	256	Disc.: LINEAR; Potentially hazardous object	MPC · JPL
8	2002 VS85	APO	24.1	54 m	single	3 days	15 Nov 2002	34	Disc.: LINEAR	MPC · JPL
0	2002 VV91	MBA-M	18.04	730 m	multiple	2002–2021	10 Apr 2021	53	Disc.: LINEAR	MPC · JPL
3	2002 VX91	ATE	24.3	49 m	multiple	2002–2008	28 Feb 2008	43	Disc.: LINEAR	MPC · JPL
6	2002 VY91	APO	26.3	20 m	single	22 days	04 Dec 2002	20	Disc.: LINEAR	MPC · JPL
7	2002 VZ91	APO	26.1	21 m	single	16 days	28 Nov 2002	26	Disc.: LINEAR	MPC · JPL
0	2002 VC93	MBA-I	17.1	2.1 km	multiple	2002–2021	04 Jan 2021	199	Disc.: LINEAR; Alt.: 2002 XH115, 2009 TV48, 2009 UD67, 2009 WX174	MPC · JPL
0	2002 VR94	AMO	19.1	540 m	multiple	2002–2014	23 Jan 2014	142	Disc.: LINEAR	MPC · JPL
4	2002 VT94	AMO	19.7	410 m	single	78 days	30 Jan 2003	55	Disc.: LINEAR	MPC · JPL
E	2002 VZ94	TNO	7.0	137 km	single	18 days	29 Nov 2002	9	Disc.: Kitt Peak Obs. LoUTNOs, cubewano?	MPC · JPL
E	2002 VA95	TNO	8.3	75 km	single	1 day	13 Nov 2002	5	Disc.: Kitt Peak Obs. LoUTNOs, cubewano?	MPC · JPL
E	2002 VB95	TNO	8.9	78 km	single	18 days	30 Nov 2002	12	Disc.: Kitt Peak Obs. LoUTNOs, plutino?	MPC · JPL
E	2002 VC95	TNO	8.0	86 km	single	18 days	30 Nov 2002	11	Disc.: Kitt Peak Obs. LoUTNOs, cubewano?	MPC · JPL
9	2002 VD95	TNO	8.6	79 km	single	1 day	13 Nov 2002	5	Disc.: Kitt Peak Obs. LoUTNOs, other TNO	MPC · JPL
1	2002 VR98	MBA-I	18.29	650 m	multiple	2002–2021	10 Aug 2021	51	Disc.: LPL/Spacewatch II; Alt.: 2002 UK43	MPC · JPL
3	2002 VU114	APO	22.8	98 m	multiple	2002–2020	18 Nov 2020	53	Disc.: LINEAR	MPC · JPL
0	2002 VG118	MBA-I	18.1	710 m	multiple	2002–2018	07 Mar 2018	43	Disc.: LINEAR	MPC · JPL
4	2002 VE130	TNO	6.38	176 km	multiple	2002–2021	11 Jan 2021	21	Disc.: Kitt Peak Obs. LoUTNOs, cubewano (cold)	MPC · JPL
3	2002 VF130	TNO	6.8	137 km	multiple	2002–2020	14 Nov 2020	24	Disc.: Kitt Peak Obs. LoUTNOs, other TNO, binary: 119 km	MPC · JPL
5	2002 VV130	TNO	7.52	113 km	multiple	2002–2021	13 Sep 2021	22	Disc.: Kitt Peak Obs. LoUTNOs, res · 3:5, BR-mag: 1.92; taxonomy: RR	MPC · JPL
E	2002 VW130	TNO	6.9	143 km	single	25 days	02 Dec 2002	5	Disc.: Kitt Peak Obs. LoUTNOs, cubewano?	MPC · JPL
3	2002 VX130	TNO	8.35	101 km	multiple	2002–2021	05 Nov 2021	24	Disc.: Kitt Peak Obs. LoUTNOs, plutino	MPC · JPL
E	2002 VY130	TNO	8.4	99 km	single	24 days	01 Dec 2002	5	Disc.: Kitt Peak Obs. LoUTNOs, plutino?	MPC · JPL
E	2002 VZ130	TNO	7.3	119 km	single	23 days	02 Dec 2002	4	Disc.: Kitt Peak Obs. LoUTNOs, cubewano?	MPC · JPL
2	2002 VB131	TNO	6.4	174 km	multiple	2002–2013	07 Oct 2013	25	Disc.: Kitt Peak Obs. LoUTNOs, cubewano (cold)	MPC · JPL
E	2002 VC131	TNO	6.4	180 km	single	24 days	01 Dec 2002	5	Disc.: Kitt Peak Obs. LoUTNOs, cubewano?	MPC · JPL
3	2002 VD131	TNO	6.6	159 km	multiple	2002–2020	20 Oct 2020	19	Disc.: Kitt Peak Obs. LoUTNOs, cubewano (cold), BR-mag: 1.21	MPC · JPL
E	2002 VE131	TNO	6.5	209 km	single	25 days	02 Dec 2002	5	Disc.: Kitt Peak Obs. LoUTNOs, other TNO	MPC · JPL
3	2002 VF131	TNO	6.7	152 km	multiple	2002–2020	30 Jan 2020	13	Disc.: Kitt Peak Obs. LoUTNOs, cubewano (cold)	MPC · JPL
–	2002 VG131	CEN	11.3	31 km	single	26 days	05 Dec 2002	6	Disc.: Kitt Peak Obs.	MPC · JPL
0	2002 VA133	MBA-M	18.0	1.4 km	multiple	2002–2020	15 Oct 2020	33	Disc.: Spacewatch; Added on 17 January 2021	MPC · JPL
0	2002 VG136	MBA-O	17.1	2.1 km	multiple	2002–2021	15 Jan 2021	38	Disc.: Kitt Peak Obs.	MPC · JPL
4	2002 VD138	TNO	8.36	101 km	multiple	1999–2020	09 Dec 2020	19	Disc.: Kitt Peak Obs. LoUTNOs, plutino	MPC · JPL
0	2002 VO139	MBA-O	16.7	2.5 km	multiple	2002–2020	31 Jan 2020	126	Disc.: NEAT; Alt.: 2015 DL191	MPC · JPL
0	2002 VZ140	MBA-M	17.69	860 m	multiple	2002–2021	03 May 2021	108	Disc.: SDSS; Alt.: 2010 RV38, 2014 OV56	MPC · JPL
0	2002 VF142	MBA-M	18.6	800 m	multiple	2002–2019	20 Dec 2019	42	Disc.: NEAT	MPC · JPL
1	2002 VJ144	MBA-M	18.4	880 m	multiple	2002–2019	27 Nov 2019	74	Disc.: NEAT; Alt.: 2015 XU115	MPC · JPL
1	2002 VL144	MBA-I	18.9	490 m	multiple	2002–2019	24 Oct 2019	44	Disc.: NEAT	MPC · JPL
1	2002 VU145	MBA-I	18.4	620 m	multiple	2002–2019	28 Jan 2019	69	Disc.: NEAT	MPC · JPL
2	2002 VE146	MBA-O	17.1	2.1 km	multiple	2002–2019	24 Nov 2019	53	Disc.: NEAT; Alt.: 2019 SW12	MPC · JPL
0	2002 VX147	MBA-I	19.30	410 m	multiple	2002–2021	08 Sep 2021	85	Disc.: NEAT	MPC · JPL
0	2002 VD151	MBA-I	18.6	570 m	multiple	2002–2017	26 Nov 2017	40	Disc.: Kitt Peak Obs.	MPC · JPL
0	2002 VK151	MBA-M	18.1	710 m	multiple	2002–2019	19 Dec 2019	37	Disc.: Kitt Peak Obs.	MPC · JPL
0	2002 VL151	MBA-M	17.4	1.4 km	multiple	2002–2019	25 Nov 2019	55	Disc.: NEAT; Alt.: 2019 NS7	MPC · JPL
0	2002 VN151	MBA-M	17.4	1.8 km	multiple	2002–2018	18 Feb 2018	34	Disc.: Kitt Peak Obs. Alt.: 2010 HJ134	MPC · JPL
0	2002 VC152	MBA-M	17.7	1.2 km	multiple	2002–2019	28 Nov 2019	51	Disc.: Kitt Peak Obs.	MPC · JPL
0	2002 VE152	MBA-I	18.8	520 m	multiple	2002–2019	02 May 2019	49	Disc.: Kitt Peak Obs.	MPC · JPL
0	2002 VK152	MBA-I	18.5	590 m	multiple	1995–2019	05 Nov 2019	48	Disc.: LPL/Spacewatch II	MPC · JPL
0	2002 VV152	MBA-I	18.9	490 m	multiple	2002–2020	21 Jan 2020	46	Disc.: Kitt Peak Obs.	MPC · JPL
0	2002 VW152	MBA-M	18.3	920 m	multiple	2002–2019	25 Nov 2019	38	Disc.: Kitt Peak Obs.	MPC · JPL
3	2002 VD153	MBA-M	19.6	360 m	multiple	2002–2018	12 Nov 2018	27	Disc.: Kitt Peak Obs.	MPC · JPL
0	2002 VU153	MBA-O	17.0	2.2 km	multiple	2002–2019	28 Nov 2019	30	Disc.: Kitt Peak Obs.	MPC · JPL
0	2002 VV153	MBA-M	18.4	880 m	multiple	2002–2019	01 Nov 2019	64	Disc.: LPL/Spacewatch II	MPC · JPL
0	2002 VG154	MBA-O	16.9	2.3 km	multiple	2002–2021	18 Jan 2021	45	Disc.: Kitt Peak Obs.	MPC · JPL
0	2002 VL154	MBA-M	18.4	880 m	multiple	2002–2019	19 Nov 2019	35	Disc.: Kitt Peak Obs.	MPC · JPL
0	2002 VN154	MBA-M	18.3	1.2 km	multiple	2002–2019	08 Aug 2019	27	Disc.: Kitt Peak Obs. Added on 19 October 2020	MPC · JPL
1	2002 VO154	MBA-I	19.57	360 m	multiple	2002–2020	17 Dec 2020	47	Disc.: Kitt Peak Obs. Added on 17 January 2021	MPC · JPL
1	2002 VS154	MBA-M	18.2	1.3 km	multiple	2002–2020	11 Dec 2020	29	Disc.: Kitt Peak Obs. Added on 9 March 2021	MPC · JPL

back to top
