= List of unnumbered minor planets: 2002 C =

This is a partial list of unnumbered minor planets for principal provisional designations assigned during 1–15 February 2002. As of March 2026, a total of 114 bodies remain unnumbered for this period. Objects for this year are listed on the following pages: A–B · C · D–F · G–K · L–O · P · Q_{i} · Q_{ii} · R_{i} · R_{ii} · S · T_{i} · T_{ii} · U–V and W–Y. Also see previous and next year.

| Near-Earth obj. | MBA (inner) | MBA (outer) | Centaur |
| Mars-crosser | MBA (middle) | Jupiter trojan | Trans-Neptunian obj. |
| Unclassified |

== C ==
| U | Designation | Class | Physical | | Observations | | | | Description and notes | Ref |
| U | Designation | Class | H | D | Opp. | Arc | Last | Used | Description and notes | Ref |
|---|---|---|---|---|---|---|---|---|---|---|
| 1 | 2002 CP4 | AMO | 21.27 | 210 m | multiple | 2002-2024 | 19 Dec 2024 | 55 | Disc.: AMOS | MPC · JPL |
| 1 | 2002 CZ8 | MBA-O | 17.52 | 1.7 km | multiple | 2002–2021 | 09 Aug 2021 | 34 | Disc.: LPL/Spacewatch II | MPC · JPL |
| 1 | 2002 CY9 | APO | 19.2 | 510 m | multiple | 2002–2020 | 21 Jul 2020 | 86 | Disc.: LINEAR; Potentially hazardous object | MPC · JPL |
| 2 | 2002 CR11 | AMO | 20.2 | 320 m | multiple | 2002–2006 | 08 Jan 2006 | 40 | Disc.: LONEOS | MPC · JPL |
| 0 | 2002 CS11 | AMO | 21.74 | 190 m | multiple | 2002-2025 | 07 Apr 2025 | 63 | Disc.: LINEAR | MPC · JPL |
| 8 | 2002 CV11 | APO | 23.8 | 62 m | single | 7 days | 14 Feb 2002 | 22 | Disc.: LINEAR | MPC · JPL |
| 8 | 2002 CW11 | ATE | 26.1 | 21 m | single | 14 days | 21 Feb 2002 | 30 | Disc.: LPL/Spacewatch II | MPC · JPL |
| 8 | 2002 CC14 | ATE | 24.8 | 39 m | single | 7 days | 14 Feb 2002 | 43 | Disc.: LINEAR | MPC · JPL |
| – | 2002 CK15 | MCA | 18.6 | 1.1 km | single | 29 days | 05 Mar 2002 | 39 | Disc.: LINEAR | MPC · JPL |
| 0 | 2002 CN15 | APO | 20.8 | 250 m | multiple | 2002–2020 | 24 Nov 2020 | 75 | Disc.: CSS | MPC · JPL |
| 2 | 2002 CB19 | APO | 25.0 | 36 m | multiple | 2002–2018 | 05 Feb 2018 | 35 | Disc.: LINEAR | MPC · JPL |
| 4 | 2002 CZ25 | HUN | 19.6 | 360 m | multiple | 2002–2010 | 14 Mar 2010 | 39 | Disc.: NEAT | MPC · JPL |
| 8 | 2002 CA26 | APO | 27.3 | 12 m | single | 4 days | 12 Feb 2002 | 14 | Disc.: LINEAR | MPC · JPL |
| 8 | 2002 CB26 | APO | 26.9 | 15 m | single | 4 days | 14 Feb 2002 | 16 | Disc.: LINEAR | MPC · JPL |
| 2 | 2002 CC26 | AMO | 24.4 | 47 m | multiple | 2002–2019 | 12 Feb 2019 | 71 | Disc.: LINEAR; Alt.: 2019 CM1 | MPC · JPL |
| 0 | 2002 CD44 | HUN | 18.9 | 490 m | multiple | 2002–2020 | 27 Jan 2020 | 59 | Disc.: LINEAR; Alt.: 2013 QF17 | MPC · JPL |
| 6 | 2002 CT46 | AMO | 20.8 | 250 m | single | 83 days | 05 May 2002 | 103 | Disc.: NEAT | MPC · JPL |
| 5 | 2002 CU46 | APO | 21.1 | 210 m | single | 21 days | 03 Mar 2002 | 55 | Disc.: LINEAR | MPC · JPL |
| 1 | 2002 CV46 | AMO | 21.3 | 200 m | multiple | 2002–2014 | 30 Aug 2014 | 57 | Disc.: LINEAR | MPC · JPL |
| 0 | 2002 CX58 | APO | 22.3 | 120 m | multiple | 2002–2016 | 07 Jun 2016 | 184 | Disc.: LINEAR | MPC · JPL |
| 0 | 2002 CG89 | MBA-I | 17.7 | 860 m | multiple | 2002–2013 | 19 Feb 2013 | 31 | Disc.: LINEAR; Alt.: 2013 BF29 | MPC · JPL |
| 0 | 2002 CC116 | MBA-O | 17.9 | 1.5 km | multiple | 2002–2018 | 19 Mar 2018 | 60 | Disc.: LINEAR | MPC · JPL |
| 5 | 2002 CW116 | MBA-M | 16.4 | 2.2 km | single | 65 days | 17 Feb 2002 | 18 | Disc.: NEAT | MPC · JPL |
| 0 | 2002 CL124 | MBA-I | 17.7 | 860 m | multiple | 2002–2020 | 20 Jan 2020 | 69 | Disc.: LINEAR; Alt.: 2013 CA46 | MPC · JPL |
| 0 | 2002 CS148 | MBA-M | 18.1 | 1.0 km | multiple | 2002–2020 | 21 Jun 2020 | 45 | Disc.: LINEAR; Alt.: 2015 FF8 | MPC · JPL |
| 0 | 2002 CR152 | MCA | 18.9 | 490 m | multiple | 2002–2017 | 16 Aug 2017 | 59 | Disc.: LINEAR; Alt.: 2013 BZ41 | MPC · JPL |
| E | 2002 CO154 | TNO | 6.5 | 172 km | single | 37 days | 15 Mar 2002 | 9 | Disc.: Kitt Peak Obs. LoUTNOs, cubewano? | MPC · JPL |
| - | 2002 CP154 | TNO | 6.5 | 209 km | single | 30 days | 08 Mar 2002 | 8 | Disc.: Kitt Peak Obs. LoUTNOs, other TNO | MPC · JPL |
| 4 | 2002 CQ154 | TNO | 6.84 | 150 km | multiple | 2002-2026 | 15 Apr 2026 | 27 | Disc.: Kitt Peak Obs. Alt.: 2019 EM7; LoUTNOs, cubewano? | MPC · JPL |
| E | 2002 CR154 | TNO | 7.0 | 137 km | single | 31 days | 09 Mar 2002 | 5 | Disc.: Kitt Peak Obs. LoUTNOs, cubewano? | MPC · JPL |
| 5 | 2002 CS154 | TNO | 6.8 | 145 km | multiple | 2002–2018 | 10 Apr 2018 | 21 | Disc.: Kitt Peak Obs. LoUTNOs, cubewano (cold) | MPC · JPL |
| 3 | 2002 CT154 | TNO | 7.17 | 122 km | multiple | 2001–2021 | 12 May 2021 | 28 | Disc.: Kitt Peak Obs. LoUTNOs, cubewano (cold) | MPC · JPL |
| 4 | 2002 CU154 | TNO | 6.8 | 145 km | multiple | 2002–2015 | 15 Apr 2015 | 26 | Disc.: Kitt Peak Obs. LoUTNOs, cubewano (cold) | MPC · JPL |
| E | 2002 CV154 | TNO | 6.1 | 207 km | single | 31 days | 09 Mar 2002 | 5 | Disc.: Kitt Peak Obs. LoUTNOs, cubewano? | MPC · JPL |
| E | 2002 CW154 | TNO | 6.4 | 218 km | single | 1 day | 07 Feb 2002 | 3 | Disc.: Kitt Peak Obs. LoUTNOs, other TNO | MPC · JPL |
| 4 | 2002 CY154 | TNO | 6.70 | 152 km | multiple | 2002–2021 | 20 Mar 2021 | 25 | Disc.: Kitt Peak Obs. LoUTNOs, cubewano (cold) | MPC · JPL |
| 3 | 2002 CZ154 | TNO | 7.52 | 161 km | multiple | 2002–2021 | 12 May 2021 | 21 | Disc.: Kitt Peak Obs. LoUTNOs, cubewano (hot) | MPC · JPL |
| 2 | 2002 CY161 | MCA | 17.5 | 1.8 km | multiple | 2002–2012 | 04 Jan 2012 | 71 | Disc.: LINEAR | MPC · JPL |
| 0 | 2002 CX174 | MCA | 16.9 | 2.3 km | multiple | 2002–2018 | 17 May 2018 | 263 | Disc.: LINEAR | MPC · JPL |
| 1 | 2002 CD184 | MBA-M | 17.4 | 1.8 km | multiple | 2002–2020 | 24 Mar 2020 | 53 | Disc.: LINEAR; Added on 22 July 2020 | MPC · JPL |
| 0 | 2002 CH188 | MBA-O | 16.9 | 2.3 km | multiple | 2002–2021 | 30 Sep 2021 | 51 | Disc.: LINEAR | MPC · JPL |
| 1 | 2002 CY190 | MBA-M | 18.83 | 500 m | multiple | 2002–2023 | 26 Mar 2023 | 42 | Disc.: LINEAR | MPC · JPL |
| 0 | 2002 CY193 | MBA-M | 17.55 | 1.2 km | multiple | 2002-2023 | 16 Apr 2023 | 33 | Disc.: LINEAR; Alt.: 2019 KH73 | MPC · JPL |
| 1 | 2002 CV197 | MBA-M | 18.36 | 630 m | multiple | 2002–2021 | 26 Nov 2021 | 62 | Disc.: LINEAR | MPC · JPL |
| 4 | 2002 CW224 | TNO | 7.14 | 176 km | multiple | 2001–2021 | 11 Jan 2021 | 42 | Disc.: Kitt Peak Obs. LoUTNOs, plutino | MPC · JPL |
| 5 | 2002 CX224 | TNO | 6.0 | 263 km | multiple | 2001–2017 | 20 Dec 2017 | 26 | Disc.: Kitt Peak Obs. LoUTNOs, other TNO | MPC · JPL |
| 4 | 2002 CZ224 | TNO | 7.0 | 132 km | multiple | 2002–2013 | 14 Mar 2013 | 31 | Disc.: Kitt Peak Obs. LoUTNOs, cubewano (cold) | MPC · JPL |
| E | 2002 CA225 | TNO | 7.2 | 125 km | single | 34 days | 13 Mar 2002 | 6 | Disc.: Kitt Peak Obs. LoUTNOs, cubewano? | MPC · JPL |
| 4 | 2002 CB225 | TNO | 7.25 | 118 km | multiple | 2002–2021 | 20 Mar 2021 | 28 | Disc.: Kitt Peak Obs. LoUTNOs, cubewano (cold) | MPC · JPL |
| – | 2002 CC225 | MCA | 19.9 | 440 m | single | 5 days | 18 Feb 2002 | 9 | Disc.: Bohyunsan Obs. | MPC · JPL |
| 0 | 2002 CX228 | MBA-M | 18.4 | 880 m | multiple | 2002–2020 | 21 May 2020 | 33 | Disc.: LPL = (887176)/Spacewatch II; Added on 11 May 2021; Alt.: 2011 GL16 | MPC · JPL |
| 0 | 2002 CZ228 | MBA-I | 18.95 | 480 m | multiple | 2002–2021 | 15 Apr 2021 | 50 | Disc.: LPL/Spacewatch II | MPC · JPL |
| 0 | 2002 CP229 | HUN | 19.84 | 320 m | multiple | 2002–2021 | 15 Aug 2021 | 30 | Disc.: Spacewatch; Alt.: 2015 DG100 | MPC · JPL |
| 1 | 2002 CY230 | MBA-I | 19.2 | 430 m | multiple | 2002–2018 | 05 Oct 2018 | 31 | Disc.: Cerro Tololo; Alt.: 2016 CA114 | MPC · JPL |
| 0 | 2002 CC231 | MBA-I | 18.7 | 540 m | multiple | 2002–2020 | 16 Feb 2020 | 37 | Disc.: Cerro Tololo; Added on 22 July 2020 | MPC · JPL |
| 2 | 2002 CM231 | MBA-M | 18.4 | 880 m | multiple | 2002–2015 | 19 Feb 2015 | 20 | Disc.: Cerro Tololo | MPC · JPL |
| 2 | 2002 CZ248 | TNO | 8.2 | 83 km | multiple | 2002–2018 | 09 Dec 2018 | 27 | Disc.: Kitt Peak Obs. LoUTNOs, res · 3:7; Alt.: 2006 CK69 | MPC · JPL |
| E | 2002 CA249 | CEN | 12.0 | 22 km | single | 37 days | 15 Mar 2002 | 4 | Disc.: Kitt Peak Obs. | MPC · JPL |
| 5 | 2002 CB249 | CEN | 9.9 | 58 km | single | 69 days | 17 Apr 2002 | 15 | Disc.: Kitt Peak Obs. | MPC · JPL |
| 5 | 2002 CW249 | MBA-M | 18.6 | 1.1 km | multiple | 2002–2016 | 05 Feb 2016 | 14 | Disc.: Kitt Peak Obs. Added on 22 July 2020; Alt.: 2016 BH78 | MPC · JPL |
| 0 | 2002 CY250 | MBA-I | 19.1 | 450 m | multiple | 2002–2020 | 16 Nov 2020 | 36 | Disc.: Kitt Peak Obs. Added on 17 January 2021 | MPC · JPL |
| E | 2002 CC251 | TNO | 8.0 | 119 km | single | 42 days | 20 Mar 2002 | 4 | Disc.: Kitt Peak Obs. LoUTNOs, plutino? | MPC · JPL |
| 4 | 2002 CD251 | TNO | 7.0 | 132 km | multiple | 2002–2013 | 14 Mar 2013 | 21 | Disc.: Kitt Peak Obs. LoUTNOs, cubewano (cold) | MPC · JPL |
| 2 | 2002 CE251 | TNO | 8.4 | 99 km | multiple | 2002–2015 | 23 Mar 2015 | 23 | Disc.: Kitt Peak Obs. LoUTNOs, plutino | MPC · JPL |
| 0 | 2002 CP251 | MBA-M | 17.8 | 1.2 km | multiple | 2002–2019 | 01 Apr 2019 | 70 | Disc.: NEAT; Alt.: 2010 BS99 | MPC · JPL |
| 0 | 2002 CF259 | HUN | 19.68 | 340 m | multiple | 2002–2021 | 07 Nov 2021 | 48 | Disc.: Kitt Peak Obs. Added on 30 September 2021 | MPC · JPL |
| 0 | 2002 CA260 | MBA-I | 18.79 | 520 m | multiple | 2002–2021 | 13 Apr 2021 | 40 | Disc.: Spacewatch; Added on 19 October 2020 | MPC · JPL |
| 0 | 2002 CH260 | MCA | 18.5 | 840 m | multiple | 2002–2019 | 26 Feb 2019 | 40 | Disc.: NEAT; Alt.: 2019 AH9 | MPC · JPL |
| 0 | 2002 CN262 | MBA-O | 17.2 | 2.0 km | multiple | 2002–2020 | 22 Sep 2020 | 29 | Disc.: Kitt Peak Obs. Added on 17 January 2021 | MPC · JPL |
| 0 | 2002 CC264 | MBA-I | 18.4 | 620 m | multiple | 2002–2021 | 08 Jun 2021 | 55 | Disc.: LPL/Spacewatch II | MPC · JPL |
| 0 | 2002 CQ265 | MBA-O | 17.5 | 1.8 km | multiple | 2002–2019 | 05 Feb 2019 | 22 | Disc.: LPL/Spacewatch II; Alt.: 2013 BE71 | MPC · JPL |
| 0 | 2002 CL268 | MBA-I | 18.71 | 540 m | multiple | 2002–2020 | 17 Apr 2020 | 64 | Disc.: NEAT | MPC · JPL |
| 1 | 2002 CO268 | MBA-I | 18.9 | 490 m | multiple | 2000–2017 | 18 Feb 2017 | 30 | Disc.: Kitt Peak Obs. | MPC · JPL |
| 0 | 2002 CK271 | MBA-I | 18.8 | 520 m | multiple | 2002–2021 | 13 Feb 2021 | 27 | Disc.: Kitt Peak Obs. Added on 17 June 2021 | MPC · JPL |
| 0 | 2002 CO271 | MBA-M | 17.64 | 1.2 km | multiple | 2002–2021 | 10 Aug 2021 | 48 | Disc.: LPL/Spacewatch II | MPC · JPL |
| 1 | 2002 CU273 | MBA-O | 17.54 | 1.5 km | multiple | 2002-2024 | 07 Apr 2024 | 57 | Disc.: LPL/Spacewatch II | MPC · JPL |
| 0 | 2002 CH274 | MBA-M | 18.3 | 920 m | multiple | 2002–2019 | 23 Apr 2019 | 60 | Disc.: Spacewatch | MPC · JPL |
| 0 | 2002 CW292 | MBA-O | 16.64 | 2.6 km | multiple | 2002–2021 | 04 Oct 2021 | 73 | Disc.: LINEAR | MPC · JPL |
| 0 | 2002 CT298 | MBA-I | 18.3 | 650 m | multiple | 2002–2020 | 23 Jul 2020 | 61 | Disc.: LINEAR | MPC · JPL |
| 0 | 2002 CG316 | MBA-O | 17.7 | 1.6 km | multiple | 2002–2019 | 29 Jul 2019 | 23 | Disc.: Kitt Peak Obs. Added on 22 July 2020 | MPC · JPL |
| 0 | 2002 CV317 | MCA | 20.06 | 260 m | multiple | 2002-2924 | 11 Jan 2024 | 49 | Disc.: NEAT | MPC · JPL |
| – | 2002 CT318 | MBA-I | 18.3 | 650 m | single | 18 days | 22 Feb 2002 | 7 | Disc.: NEAT | MPC · JPL |
| 0 | 2002 CS321 | MBA-I | 18.6 | 570 m | multiple | 2002–2019 | 20 Dec 2019 | 50 | Disc.: LPL/Spacewatch II | MPC · JPL |
| 0 | 2002 CB322 | MBA-O | 17.2 | 2.0 km | multiple | 2002–2017 | 11 Dec 2017 | 40 | Disc.: Kitt Peak Obs. | MPC · JPL |
| 0 | 2002 CF322 | MBA-I | 18.77 | 520 m | multiple | 2002–2021 | 12 Aug 2021 | 52 | Disc.: Kitt Peak Obs. | MPC · JPL |
| 0 | 2002 CH322 | MBA-I | 19.31 | 410 m | multiple | 2002–2022 | 25 Jan 2022 | 47 | Disc.: LPL/Spacewatch II | MPC · JPL |
| 0 | 2002 CL322 | MBA-I | 18.81 | 510 m | multiple | 2002–2021 | 11 Jul 2021 | 56 | Disc.: LPL/Spacewatch II | MPC · JPL |
| 0 | 2002 CN322 | MBA-I | 19.3 | 410 m | multiple | 2002–2017 | 17 Sep 2017 | 29 | Disc.: Kitt Peak Obs. | MPC · JPL |
| 0 | 2002 CW322 | MBA-O | 17.6 | 1.7 km | multiple | 2002–2017 | 27 Apr 2017 | 22 | Disc.: Kitt Peak Obs. | MPC · JPL |
| 1 | 2002 CA323 | MBA-M | 19.51 | 370 m | multiple | 2002–2021 | 08 Sep 2021 | 36 | Disc.: Kitt Peak Obs. | MPC · JPL |
| 0 | 2002 CC323 | MBA-I | 18.83 | 510 m | multiple | 2002–2021 | 09 Aug 2021 | 30 | Disc.: Kitt Peak Obs. | MPC · JPL |
| 0 | 2002 CR324 | MBA-I | 18.1 | 710 m | multiple | 2002–2020 | 01 Jan 2020 | 55 | Disc.: Kitt Peak Obs. | MPC · JPL |
| 0 | 2002 CX324 | MBA-M | 17.7 | 1.6 km | multiple | 2002–2021 | 08 May 2021 | 51 | Disc.: Kitt Peak Obs. | MPC · JPL |
| 0 | 2002 CG325 | MBA-M | 17.9 | 1.1 km | multiple | 2002–2018 | 10 Dec 2018 | 42 | Disc.: SDSS | MPC · JPL |
| 0 | 2002 CL325 | MBA-M | 17.9 | 1.1 km | multiple | 2002–2018 | 15 Dec 2018 | 31 | Disc.: SDSS | MPC · JPL |
| 0 | 2002 CP325 | MBA-M | 18.8 | 730 m | multiple | 2002–2018 | 17 Nov 2018 | 37 | Disc.: LPL/Spacewatch II | MPC · JPL |
| 0 | 2002 CM326 | MBA-I | 18.9 | 490 m | multiple | 2002–2019 | 08 Jun 2019 | 48 | Disc.: Kitt Peak Obs. Alt.: 2003 SM473 | MPC · JPL |
| 0 | 2002 CD327 | MBA-O | 18.0 | 1.4 km | multiple | 2002–2017 | 18 Nov 2017 | 27 | Disc.: LPL/Spacewatch II | MPC · JPL |
| 0 | 2002 CE327 | MBA-M | 18.48 | 850 m | multiple | 2002–2021 | 09 Aug 2021 | 29 | Disc.: Spacewatch | MPC · JPL |
| 0 | 2002 CF327 | MBA-I | 18.5 | 590 m | multiple | 2002–2021 | 05 Jun 2021 | 49 | Disc.: Kitt Peak Obs. | MPC · JPL |
| 1 | 2002 CJ327 | HUN | 19.1 | 450 m | multiple | 1995–2019 | 02 Oct 2019 | 56 | Disc.: SDSS | MPC · JPL |
| 0 | 2002 CK327 | MBA-I | 18.8 | 520 m | multiple | 1997–2019 | 04 Oct 2019 | 51 | Disc.: Kitt Peak Obs. | MPC · JPL |
| 1 | 2002 CN327 | MBA-I | 19.0 | 470 m | multiple | 2002–2019 | 04 Dec 2019 | 41 | Disc.: Kitt Peak Obs. | MPC · JPL |
| 0 | 2002 CQ327 | MBA-I | 19.11 | 450 m | multiple | 2002–2021 | 14 Apr 2021 | 33 | Disc.: Kitt Peak Obs. | MPC · JPL |
| 0 | 2002 CV327 | MBA-I | 18.4 | 620 m | multiple | 2002–2020 | 21 Jan 2020 | 53 | Disc.: Kitt Peak Obs. | MPC · JPL |
| 0 | 2002 CJ328 | MBA-O | 18.09 | 1.2 km | multiple | 2002–2023 | 03 Sep 2023 | 19 | Disc.: Kitt Peak Obs. Added on 22 July 2020 | MPC · JPL |
| 0 | 2002 CK328 | MBA-O | 17.3 | 1.9 km | multiple | 2002–2019 | 28 Aug 2019 | 37 | Disc.: LPL/Spacewatch II; Added on 22 July 2020 | MPC · JPL |
| 0 | 2002 CS328 | MBA-I | 19.5 | 370 m | multiple | 2000–2018 | 11 Nov 2018 | 30 | Disc.: Kitt Peak Obs. Added on 19 October 2020 | MPC · JPL |
| 1 | 2002 CF329 | Asteroid | 16.6 | 2.7 km | multiple | 2002–2013 | 17 Mar 2013 | 19 | Disc.: Spacewatch; Added on 5 November 2021; MBA at MPC | MPC · JPL |

back to top
