= List of unnumbered minor planets: 2002 P =

This is a partial list of unnumbered minor planets for principal provisional designations assigned during 1–15 August 2002. As of March 2026, a total of 185 bodies remain unnumbered for this period. Objects for this year are listed on the following pages: A–B · C · D–F · G–K · L–O · P · Q_{i} · Q_{ii} · R_{i} · R_{ii} · S · T_{i} · T_{ii} · U–V and W–Y. Also see previous and next year.

Near-Earth obj.	MBA (inner)	MBA (outer)	Centaur
Mars-crosser	MBA (middle)	Jupiter trojan	Trans-Neptunian obj.
Unclassified

== P ==
U	Designation	Class	Physical		Observations				Description and notes	Ref
U	Designation	Class	H	D	Opp.	Arc	Last	Used	Description and notes	Ref
0	2002 PB	APO	20.5	280 m	multiple	2002–2020	18 Nov 2020	93	Disc.: LINEAR	MPC · JPL
3	2002 PN	APO	24.8	39 m	single	249 days	08 Apr 2003	131	Disc.: Desert Wanderer Obs.	MPC · JPL
3	2002 PE1	MCA	19.8	330 m	multiple	2002–2016	22 Oct 2016	28	Disc.: NEAT; Alt.: 2016 TS93	MPC · JPL
5	2002 PR1	AMO	21.9	150 m	single	88 days	31 Oct 2002	99	Disc.: NEAT; Potentially hazardous object	MPC · JPL
0	2002 PL6	MCA	17.4	1.4 km	multiple	2002–2019	29 Aug 2019	202	Disc.: LINEAR	MPC · JPL
1	2002 PN6	AMO	20.9	230 m	multiple	2002–2009	19 Dec 2009	65	Disc.: NEAT	MPC · JPL
0	2002 PO6	AMO	20.7	260 m	multiple	2002–2012	27 Jul 2012	32	Disc.: NEAT	MPC · JPL
4	2002 PQ6	AMO	20.4	300 m	single	125 days	12 Nov 2002	128	Disc.: NEAT	MPC · JPL
2	2002 PB7	MBA-O	18.3	1.2 km	multiple	2002–2014	31 May 2014	34	Disc.: NEAT	MPC · JPL
0	2002 PH7	MBA-M	18.1	1.0 km	multiple	2002–2019	20 Aug 2019	54	Disc.: NEAT	MPC · JPL
0	2002 PJ7	MBA-O	16.97	2.2 km	multiple	2002–2021	15 Jan 2021	137	Disc.: NEAT	MPC · JPL
0	2002 PY8	MBA-I	17.7	860 m	multiple	2002–2019	09 Jan 2019	36	Disc.: NEAT	MPC · JPL
0	2002 PC11	AMO	19.8	390 m	multiple	2002–2015	12 Jul 2015	156	Disc.: NEAT	MPC · JPL
5	2002 PD11	APO	20.1	340 m	single	37 days	28 Aug 2002	71	Disc.: NEAT	MPC · JPL
2	2002 PV23	MCA	19.3	410 m	multiple	2002–2019	27 Oct 2019	38	Disc.: NEAT	MPC · JPL
2	2002 PX25	MCA	19.2	430 m	multiple	2002–2019	03 Dec 2019	59	Disc.: NEAT	MPC · JPL
0	2002 PU31	MBA-I	18.5	590 m	multiple	2002–2018	05 Nov 2018	117	Disc.: NEAT	MPC · JPL
5	2002 PW39	AMO	21.2	200 m	single	59 days	04 Oct 2002	24	Disc.: NEAT	MPC · JPL
3	2002 PX39	APO	23.4	74 m	single	40 days	04 Sep 2002	55	Disc.: NEAT	MPC · JPL
4	2002 PY39	AMO	21.5	180 m	single	145 days	31 Dec 2002	192	Disc.: NEAT	MPC · JPL
1	2002 PC40	MCA	19.6	360 m	multiple	2002–2015	25 Jan 2015	43	Disc.: NEAT	MPC · JPL
2	2002 PG40	MCA	19.0	620 m	multiple	2002-2014	30 Oct 2014	46	Disc.: NEAT	MPC · JPL
1	2002 PH40	MBA-M	17.94	940 m	multiple	2002-2023	18 Dec 2023	58	Disc.: NEAT	MPC · JPL
7	2002 PE43	AMO	24.1	54 m	single	4 days	14 Aug 2002	17	Disc.: LINEAR	MPC · JPL
2	2002 PN43	MCA	18.3	1.2 km	multiple	2002–2016	18 Dec 2016	95	Disc.: LINEAR	MPC · JPL
–	2002 PA52	MBA-M	17.7	860 m	single	56 days	29 Aug 2002	16	Disc.: NEAT	MPC · JPL
1	2002 PF65	MBA-M	17.9	780 m	multiple	2002–2016	03 Jan 2016	25	Disc.: NEAT; Alt.: 2006 OH28	MPC · JPL
1	2002 PU65	MBA-M	18.4	1.2 km	multiple	2002–2020	12 Sep 2020	88	Disc.: CINEOS	MPC · JPL
0	2002 PZ66	MBA-I	18.7	540 m	multiple	2002–2019	10 Jun 2019	67	Disc.: NEAT	MPC · JPL
4	2002 PC68	MBA-M	18.23	750 m	multiple	2002-2017	19 Mar 2017	26	Disc.: NEAT	MPC · JPL
0	2002 PO68	MBA-I	18.8	520 m	multiple	2002–2019	21 Dec 2019	68	Disc.: NEAT	MPC · JPL
0	2002 PU71	MBA-M	17.3	1.5 km	multiple	2002–2021	17 Jan 2021	129	Disc.: LINEAR	MPC · JPL
1	2002 PJ72	MBA-M	17.94	770 m	multiple	1998–2021	07 Apr 2021	39	Disc.: LINEAR	MPC · JPL
0	2002 PD87	MBA-I	18.3	650 m	multiple	2002–2020	14 Sep 2020	48	Disc.: NEAT	MPC · JPL
0	2002 PM87	MCA	18.0	750 m	multiple	2002–2020	22 Oct 2020	59	Disc.: NEAT; Alt.: 2016 NN25	MPC · JPL
0	2002 PP99	MBA-M	17.4	1.4 km	multiple	2002–2019	24 Dec 2019	118	Disc.: LINEAR; Alt.: 2015 VF104	MPC · JPL
0	2002 PK112	MBA-M	18.2	680 m	multiple	2002–2019	26 Nov 2019	53	Disc.: NEAT	MPC · JPL
0	2002 PN112	MBA-I	18.4	620 m	multiple	2002–2019	29 Nov 2019	55	Disc.: NEAT	MPC · JPL
1	2002 PZ112	MBA-M	18.1	700 m	multiple	2002-2023	21 Oct 2023	59	Disc.: LINEAR	MPC · JPL
0	2002 PU114	MBA-I	18.6	570 m	multiple	2002–2020	05 Nov 2020	67	Disc.: LPL/Spacewatch II	MPC · JPL
0	2002 PC115	MBA-I	19.34	400 m	multiple	2002–2021	24 Oct 2021	70	Disc.: LPL/Spacewatch II; Alt.: 2015 XY277	MPC · JPL
1	2002 PX121	MBA-M	17.9	1.1 km	multiple	2002–2019	25 Nov 2019	110	Disc.: LONEOS; Alt.: 2015 TQ105	MPC · JPL
0	2002 PE130	APO	18.2	810 m	multiple	2002–2011	31 Jan 2011	136	Disc.: LINEAR; Potentially hazardous object NEO larger than 1 kilometer	MPC · JPL
0	2002 PT136	MCA	18.4	620 m	multiple	2002–2018	11 Jul 2018	139	Disc.: NEAT	MPC · JPL
2	2002 PO140	MBA-I	18.2	680 m	multiple	2002–2019	08 Jan 2019	29	Disc.: LONEOS; Alt.: 2006 UO184	MPC · JPL
6	2002 PR140	MCA	18.7	540 m	single	34 days	02 Sep 2002	39	Disc.: CINEOS	MPC · JPL
0	2002 PS140	MCA	19.98	670 m	multiple	2002-2025	26 Oct 2025	57	Disc.: NEAT	MPC · JPL
0	2002 PT140	MCA	20.81	290 m	multiple	2002–2019	29 Oct 2019	143	Disc.: NEAT	MPC · JPL
1	2002 PR142	MBA-M	18.5	840 m	multiple	2002–2020	05 Nov 2020	26	Disc.: Cerro Tololo; Added on 9 March 2021	MPC · JPL
0	2002 PA143	MBA-I	18.7	540 m	multiple	2002–2020	22 Oct 2020	52	Disc.: Cerro Tololo; Added on 11 May 2021; Alt.: 2019 GF80	MPC · JPL
0	2002 PM143	MBA-I	19.2	430 m	multiple	2002–2020	23 Sep 2020	44	Disc.: Cerro Tololo	MPC · JPL
0	2002 PL144	MBA-O	17.40	1.8 km	multiple	2002–2020	20 Oct 2020	28	Disc.: Cerro Tololo; Added on 9 March 2021	MPC · JPL
1	2002 PO144	MBA-I	19.17	440 m	multiple	2002–2021	27 Sep 2021	26	Disc.: Cerro Tololo; Added on 30 September 2021; Alt.: 2021 PR67	MPC · JPL
1	2002 PB145	MBA-I	19.32	410 m	multiple	2002–2021	26 Nov 2021	27	Disc.: Cerro Tololo; Added on 24 December 2021	MPC · JPL
2	2002 PM146	MBA-I	18.95	480 m	multiple	2002–2021	08 Aug 2021	30	Disc.: Cerro Tololo; Added on 22 July 2020	MPC · JPL
E	2002 PN147	TNO	6.3	189 km	single	1 day	10 Aug 2002	3	Disc.: Cerro Tololo; LoUTNOs, cubewano?	MPC · JPL
0	2002 PY147	MBA-I	18.6	570 m	multiple	2002–2020	19 Oct 2020	82	Disc.: Cerro Tololo; Added on 21 August 2021; Alt.: 2013 RT134	MPC · JPL
0	2002 PZ147	MBA-M	18.7	760 m	multiple	2002–2019	22 Oct 2019	31	Disc.: Cerro Tololo; Added on 22 July 2020	MPC · JPL
0	2002 PU148	MBA-M	18.93	1.7 km	multiple	2002-2024	22 Dec 2024	42	Disc.: Cerro Tololo	MPC · JPL
–	2002 PX148	MBA-M	18.1	1.0 km	single	5 days	15 Aug 2002	7	Disc.: Cerro Tololo	MPC · JPL
0	2002 PB149	MBA-I	19.3	410 m	multiple	2002–2020	14 Sep 2020	37	Disc.: Cerro Tololo	MPC · JPL
E	2002 PE149	TNO	6.6	164 km	single	1 day	12 Aug 2002	3	Disc.: Cerro Tololo; LoUTNOs, cubewano?	MPC · JPL
E	2002 PF149	TNO	6.6	164 km	single	1 day	12 Aug 2002	3	Disc.: Cerro Tololo; LoUTNOs, cubewano?	MPC · JPL
8	2002 PH149	TNO	7.07	164 km	multiple	2002-2025	23 Jul 2025	7	Disc.: Cerro Tololo; LoUTNOs, cubewano?	MPC · JPL
5	2002 PJ149	TNO	6.23	299 km	multiple	2002-2025	21 Aug 2025	21	Disc.: Cerro Tololo; LoUTNOs, cubewano?	MPC · JPL
9	2002 PK149	TNO	7.0	166 km	single	1 day	12 Aug 2002	3	Disc.: Cerro Tololo; LoUTNOs, other TNO	MPC · JPL
9	2002 PN149	TNO	7.0	137 km	single	29 days	09 Sep 2002	5	Disc.: Cerro Tololo; LoUTNOs, cubewano?	MPC · JPL
4	2002 PO149	TNO	6.64	156 km	multiple	2002–2021	08 Aug 2021	16	Disc.: Cerro Tololo; LoUTNOs, cubewano (cold)	MPC · JPL
4	2002 PP149	TNO	6.9	173 km	multiple	2000–2017	23 Sep 2017	19	Disc.: Cerro Tololo; LoUTNOs, other TNO, BR-mag: 1.13; Alt.: 2000 QM252	MPC · JPL
E	2002 PQ149	TNO	7.1	158 km	single	87 days	06 Nov 2002	6	Disc.: Cerro Tololo; LoUTNOs, other TNO	MPC · JPL
4	2002 PR149	TNO	7.0	132 km	multiple	2002–2018	10 Oct 2018	20	Disc.: Cerro Tololo; Added on 30 September 2021; LoUTNOs, cubewano (cold); Alt.: 2013 TR228	MPC · JPL
4	2002 PG150	TNO	7.98	92 km	multiple	2002–2018	10 Oct 2018	20	Disc.: Cerro Tololo; LoUTNOs, res · 4:7	MPC · JPL
2	2002 PY151	MBA-M	18.46	600 m	multiple	2002-2020	26 Jan 2020	30	Disc.: Cerro Tololo	MPC · JPL
3	2002 PQ152	CEN	9.2	80 km	multiple	2001–2017	28 Oct 2017	33	Disc.: Cerro Tololo, BR-mag: 1.85	MPC · JPL
E	2002 PR152	TNO	8.7	62 km	single	2 days	15 Aug 2002	5	Disc.: Cerro Tololo; LoUTNOs, cubewano?	MPC · JPL
E	2002 PS152	TNO	8.9	57 km	single	2 days	15 Aug 2002	4	Disc.: Cerro Tololo; LoUTNOs, cubewano?	MPC · JPL
E	2002 PT152	TNO	8.3	75 km	single	2 days	15 Aug 2002	6	Disc.: Cerro Tololo; LoUTNOs, cubewano?	MPC · JPL
E	2002 PU152	TNO	8.6	65 km	single	2 days	15 Aug 2002	6	Disc.: Cerro Tololo; LoUTNOs, cubewano?	MPC · JPL
E	2002 PV152	TNO	9.5	43 km	single	2 days	15 Aug 2002	6	Disc.: Cerro Tololo; LoUTNOs, cubewano?	MPC · JPL
E	2002 PW152	TNO	9.0	54 km	single	2 days	15 Aug 2002	6	Disc.: Cerro Tololo; LoUTNOs, cubewano?	MPC · JPL
E	2002 PX152	TNO	8.7	62 km	single	2 days	15 Aug 2002	6	Disc.: Cerro Tololo; LoUTNOs, cubewano?	MPC · JPL
E	2002 PY152	TNO	9.4	45 km	single	2 days	15 Aug 2002	4	Disc.: Cerro Tololo; LoUTNOs, cubewano?	MPC · JPL
9	2002 PZ152	TNO	9.1	63 km	single	2 days	15 Aug 2002	5	Disc.: Cerro Tololo; LoUTNOs, other TNO	MPC · JPL
9	2002 PA153	TNO	8.8	60 km	single	2 days	15 Aug 2002	5	Disc.: Cerro Tololo; LoUTNOs, cubewano?	MPC · JPL
9	2002 PB153	TNO	9.1	52 km	single	2 days	15 Aug 2002	5	Disc.: Cerro Tololo; LoUTNOs, cubewano?	MPC · JPL
9	2002 PC153	TNO	7.9	90 km	single	2 days	15 Aug 2002	5	Disc.: Cerro Tololo; LoUTNOs, cubewano?	MPC · JPL
9	2002 PD153	TNO	8.7	62 km	single	2 days	15 Aug 2002	5	Disc.: Cerro Tololo; LoUTNOs, cubewano?	MPC · JPL
9	2002 PE153	TNO	6.5	172 km	single	2 days	15 Aug 2002	5	Disc.: Cerro Tololo; LoUTNOs, cubewano?	MPC · JPL
9	2002 PF153	TNO	9.0	54 km	single	2 days	15 Aug 2002	5	Disc.: Cerro Tololo; LoUTNOs, cubewano?	MPC · JPL
9	2002 PG153	TNO	9.1	50 km	single	2 days	15 Aug 2002	5	Disc.: Cerro Tololo; LoUTNOs, cubewano (cold)	MPC · JPL
9	2002 PJ153	TNO	8.9	57 km	single	2 days	15 Aug 2002	5	Disc.: Cerro Tololo; LoUTNOs, cubewano?	MPC · JPL
9	2002 PK153	TNO	7.7	99 km	single	2 days	16 Aug 2002	5	Disc.: Cerro Tololo; LoUTNOs, cubewano?	MPC · JPL
9	2002 PL153	TNO	8.7	62 km	single	2 days	16 Aug 2002	5	Disc.: Cerro Tololo; LoUTNOs, cubewano?	MPC · JPL
9	2002 PM153	TNO	9.0	66 km	single	2 days	15 Aug 2002	6	Disc.: Cerro Tololo; LoUTNOs, other TNO	MPC · JPL
9	2002 PN153	TNO	7.7	99 km	single	2 days	16 Aug 2002	5	Disc.: Cerro Tololo; LoUTNOs, cubewano?	MPC · JPL
9	2002 PO153	TNO	8.4	72 km	single	2 days	16 Aug 2002	6	Disc.: Cerro Tololo; LoUTNOs, cubewano?	MPC · JPL
9	2002 PP153	TNO	7.3	119 km	single	2 days	16 Aug 2002	6	Disc.: Cerro Tololo; LoUTNOs, cubewano?	MPC · JPL
0	2002 PG154	MBA-M	19.0	470 m	multiple	1994–2019	20 Oct 2019	41	Disc.: Cerro Tololo; Added on 22 July 2020	MPC · JPL
0	2002 PJ154	MBA-I	18.93	490 m	multiple	2002–2021	13 Jul 2021	38	Disc.: Cerro Tololo	MPC · JPL
4	2002 PD155	TNO	7.1	195 km	multiple	2001–2020	20 Oct 2020	18	Disc.: Cerro Tololo; LoUTNOs, cubewano (hot)	MPC · JPL
9	2002 PE155	TNO	6.2	197 km	single	3 days	12 Aug 2002	4	Disc.: Cerro Tololo; LoUTNOs, cubewano?	MPC · JPL
0	2002 PN159	MBA-M	17.6	1.7 km	multiple	2002–2021	09 Jan 2021	206	Disc.: NEAT	MPC · JPL
1	2002 PF160	MCA	19.2	430 m	multiple	2002–2018	15 Sep 2018	60	Disc.: NEAT	MPC · JPL
0	2002 PY160	MBA-M	17.9	780 m	multiple	2002–2020	24 Jan 2020	44	Disc.: NEAT; Alt.: 2015 XT365	MPC · JPL
–	2002 PB161	MCA	18.2	960 m	single	19 days	27 Aug 2002	12	Disc.: NEAT	MPC · JPL
4	2002 PC166	MBA-M	18.3	650 m	multiple	2002–2018	07 Aug 2018	44	Disc.: NEAT	MPC · JPL
0	2002 PM166	MBA-M	17.8	1.2 km	multiple	2002–2019	23 Sep 2019	53	Disc.: NEAT	MPC · JPL
1	2002 PX166	MCA	20.03	330 m	multiple	2002-2025	15 Dec 2025	94	Disc.: NEAT	MPC · JPL
0	2002 PE167	MBA-O	17.84	1.5 km	multiple	2002–2021	08 Aug 2021	49	Disc.: NEAT	MPC · JPL
4	2002 PR170	TNO	7.04	153 km	multiple	2002–2017	17 Sep 2017	27	Disc.: Mauna Kea Obs. LoUTNOs, centaur	MPC · JPL
3	2002 PS170	TNO	7.85	95 km	multiple	2002-2021	02 Oct 2021	30	Disc.: Mauna Kea Obs. LoUTNOs, cubewano?	MPC · JPL
5	2002 PU170	TNO	7.1	138 km	multiple	2002–2014	26 Sep 2014	25	Disc.: Mauna Kea Obs. LoUTNOs, twotino	MPC · JPL
4	2002 PX170	TNO	7.3	115 km	multiple	2002–2019	27 Sep 2019	31	Disc.: Mauna Kea Obs. LoUTNOs, cubewano (cold); Alt.: 2003 QZ113	MPC · JPL
3	2002 PY170	TNO	7.7	96 km	multiple	2002–2014	29 Jul 2014	15	Disc.: Mauna Kea Obs. LoUTNOs, cubewano (cold)	MPC · JPL
3	2002 PZ170	TNO	7.58	95 km	multiple	2002-2021	07 Oct 2021	32	Disc.: Mauna Kea Obs. LoUTNOs, cubewano?	MPC · JPL
5	2002 PA171	TNO	6.8	145 km	multiple	2002–2013	07 Oct 2013	18	Disc.: Mauna Kea Obs. LoUTNOs, cubewano (cold)	MPC · JPL
3	2002 PC171	TNO	7.6	100 km	multiple	2002–2015	08 Nov 2015	22	Disc.: Mauna Kea Obs. LoUTNOs, cubewano (cold)	MPC · JPL
0	2002 PS172	MBA-I	18.8	520 m	multiple	2002–2013	30 Aug 2013	27	Disc.: NEAT; Alt.: 2013 QF63	MPC · JPL
0	2002 PA174	MBA-M	18.5	840 m	multiple	2002–2019	27 Oct 2019	73	Disc.: NEAT; Alt.: 2015 RG286	MPC · JPL
0	2002 PQ174	MBA-I	18.1	710 m	multiple	2002–2020	14 Jun 2020	50	Disc.: NEAT	MPC · JPL
1	2002 PX174	MBA-M	17.9	780 m	multiple	2002–2020	04 Jan 2020	26	Disc.: NEAT	MPC · JPL
0	2002 PJ176	MBA-M	18.3	920 m	multiple	2002–2019	28 Sep 2019	48	Disc.: NEAT	MPC · JPL
1	2002 PC177	MBA-I	19.1	450 m	multiple	2002–2019	29 Jul 2019	44	Disc.: NEAT	MPC · JPL
0	2002 PL179	MCA	19.75	370 m	multiple	2002–2024	24 Aug 2024	73	Disc.: NEAT	MPC · JPL
1	2002 PP179	MBA-M	18.4	880 m	multiple	2002–2015	02 Oct 2015	26	Disc.: NEAT	MPC · JPL
0	2002 PE180	MBA-M	18.4	880 m	multiple	2002–2020	13 Nov 2020	72	Disc.: NEAT	MPC · JPL
1	2002 PG180	MBA-O	17.2	2.0 km	multiple	2002–2020	07 Dec 2020	42	Disc.: NEAT	MPC · JPL
–	2002 PH180	MBA-M	18.6	570 m	single	28 days	26 Aug 2002	14	Disc.: NEAT	MPC · JPL
2	2002 PJ180	MCA	19.71	310 m	multiple	2002-2023	13 Nov 2023	22	Disc.: NEAT	MPC · JPL
0	2002 PO180	MBA-M	18.03	740 m	multiple	2002–2021	15 Apr 2021	23	Disc.: NEAT	MPC · JPL
0	2002 PQ180	MBA-I	19.21	430 m	multiple	2002–2021	27 Sep 2021	92	Disc.: NEAT	MPC · JPL
2	2002 PK181	MBA-O	17.8	1.5 km	multiple	2002-2023	07 Oct 2023	45	Disc.: NEAT	MPC · JPL
2	2002 PW181	MBA-O	17.4	1.8 km	multiple	2002–2019	25 Oct 2019	27	Disc.: NEAT	MPC · JPL
1	2002 PD182	MCA	19.76	330 m	multiple	2002-2024	21 Nov 2024	33	Disc.: NEAT	MPC · JPL
1	2002 PL182	MCA	19.1	450 m	multiple	2002–2019	24 Oct 2019	65	Disc.: Cerro Tololo	MPC · JPL
2	2002 PZ183	MBA-M	17.45	1.0 km	multiple	2002-2023	13 Dec 2023	33	Disc.: NEAT	MPC · JPL
1	2002 PQ184	MBA-M	18.75	730 m	multiple	2002-2024	11 Sep 2024	28	Disc.: NEAT; Alt.: 2024 RZ16	MPC · JPL
2	2002 PU184	MBA-O	16.8	2.4 km	multiple	2002–2019	27 Sep 2019	44	Disc.: NEAT	MPC · JPL
0	2002 PE185	MBA-O	18.1	1.3 km	multiple	1997–2018	14 Aug 2018	49	Disc.: NEAT	MPC · JPL
0	2002 PN186	MBA-M	17.9	1.5 km	multiple	2002–2020	17 Oct 2020	48	Disc.: NEAT	MPC · JPL
0	2002 PG188	MBA-M	18.0	750 m	multiple	2002–2019	23 Oct 2019	32	Disc.: NEAT	MPC · JPL
0	2002 PH188	MBA-I	19.0	470 m	multiple	2002–2018	08 Aug 2018	63	Disc.: NEAT	MPC · JPL
0	2002 PP188	MBA-M	18.1	1.0 km	multiple	2002–2019	28 Oct 2019	83	Disc.: NEAT	MPC · JPL
0	2002 PM189	MCA	19.40	390 m	multiple	2002–2021	12 Nov 2021	65	Disc.: NEAT; Alt.: 2021 RT30	MPC · JPL
0	2002 PN189	MBA-M	18.6	800 m	multiple	2002–2020	20 Dec 2020	57	Disc.: NEAT	MPC · JPL
1	2002 PX189	MBA-O	17.3	1.9 km	multiple	2002–2019	24 Sep 2019	28	Disc.: NEAT	MPC · JPL
3	2002 PL190	MBA-I	18.9	490 m	multiple	2002–2016	25 Oct 2016	21	Disc.: NEAT; Alt.: 2009 SG308	MPC · JPL
2	2002 PX190	MBA-M	18.3	650 m	multiple	2002–2020	26 Jan 2020	42	Disc.: NEAT	MPC · JPL
0	2002 PL191	MBA-O	16.8	2.4 km	multiple	2002–2018	03 Nov 2018	40	Disc.: NEAT	MPC · JPL
0	2002 PQ191	MBA-I	18.3	650 m	multiple	2002–2017	15 Nov 2017	43	Disc.: NEAT	MPC · JPL
3	2002 PJ192	MBA-M	18.2	680 m	multiple	2001–2014	30 Jun 2014	31	Disc.: Kitt Peak Obs. Alt.: 2001 FX204	MPC · JPL
1	2002 PY192	HUN	19.46	330 m	multiple	2002-2025	26 Nov 2025	51	Disc.: NEAT	MPC · JPL
0	2002 PZ192	MBA-I	19.0	470 m	multiple	2002–2020	17 Nov 2020	98	Disc.: NEAT	MPC · JPL
1	2002 PA193	MBA-I	18.7	540 m	multiple	2002–2020	11 Dec 2020	47	Disc.: NEAT	MPC · JPL
1	2002 PH193	MBA-M	18.2	680 m	multiple	2002–2018	08 Aug 2018	44	Disc.: NEAT	MPC · JPL
0	2002 PC195	MBA-I	18.7	540 m	multiple	2002–2020	13 Sep 2020	41	Disc.: NEAT; Added on 19 October 2020	MPC · JPL
0	2002 PD195	MBA-I	18.7	540 m	multiple	2002–2012	14 Oct 2012	60	Disc.: NEAT; Alt.: 2009 WA190	MPC · JPL
0	2002 PY196	MBA-I	19.2	430 m	multiple	2002–2018	13 Sep 2018	39	Disc.: NEAT	MPC · JPL
1	2002 PD199	MBA-M	18.2	960 m	multiple	2002–2019	06 Jul 2019	35	Disc.: NEAT	MPC · JPL
3	2002 PF199	MBA-O	16.51	2.9 km	multiple	2002-2018	10 Oct 2018	20	Disc.: NEAT	MPC · JPL
0	2002 PJ199	MBA-I	19.12	450 m	multiple	2002–2020	16 Oct 2020	33	Disc.: NEAT	MPC · JPL
1	2002 PL199	MBA-O	17.4	1.8 km	multiple	2002–2018	14 Nov 2018	29	Disc.: NEAT	MPC · JPL
2	2002 PM199	MBA-I	18.7	540 m	multiple	2002–2017	21 May 2017	57	Disc.: NEAT; Alt.: 2005 MA38	MPC · JPL
0	2002 PB200	MBA-O	18.4	1.2 km	multiple	2002–2018	13 Aug 2018	33	Disc.: NEAT; Alt.: 2018 MZ11	MPC · JPL
0	2002 PN200	MBA-O	16.31	3.0 km	multiple	2002–2021	13 Apr 2021	284	Disc.: NEAT	MPC · JPL
0	2002 PA201	MBA-I	18.8	520 m	multiple	2002–2020	20 Oct 2020	58	Disc.: NEAT; Added on 19 October 2020	MPC · JPL
–	2002 PD201	MBA-O	17.9	1.5 km	single	44 days	29 Aug 2002	15	Disc.: NEAT	MPC · JPL
0	2002 PF201	MCA	18.6	570 m	multiple	2002–2020	05 Nov 2020	63	Disc.: NEAT	MPC · JPL
0	2002 PG201	MBA-M	18.0	750 m	multiple	2002–2018	15 Jun 2018	43	Disc.: NEAT	MPC · JPL
4	2002 PH201	MBA-M	18.63	650 m	multiple	2002-2023	13 Dec 2023	22	Disc.: NEAT	MPC · JPL
0	2002 PK201	MBA-M	17.8	1.2 km	multiple	2002–2019	28 Aug 2019	38	Disc.: NEAT	MPC · JPL
1	2002 PM201	MBA-I	18.6	570 m	multiple	2002–2020	16 May 2020	64	Disc.: NEAT	MPC · JPL
–	2002 PV201	MBA-M	18.6	800 m	single	28 days	11 Sep 2002	16	Disc.: NEAT	MPC · JPL
0	2002 PZ202	MBA-M	17.09	1.1 km	multiple	2002–2021	13 Apr 2021	52	Disc.: NEAT	MPC · JPL
1	2002 PC203	MBA-M	16.8	1.3 km	multiple	2002–2020	22 Dec 2020	33	Disc.: NEAT	MPC · JPL
0	2002 PE203	MBA-M	17.8	1.2 km	multiple	2002–2015	08 Oct 2015	44	Disc.: NEAT	MPC · JPL
0	2002 PG203	MBA-M	18.0	750 m	multiple	2002–2019	20 Dec 2019	41	Disc.: NEAT	MPC · JPL
0	2002 PQ203	MBA-M	18.0	750 m	multiple	2002–2020	05 Jan 2020	65	Disc.: AMOS	MPC · JPL
0	2002 PT203	MCA	19.57	370 m	multiple	2002-2022	29 Jul 2022	22	Disc.: NEAT	MPC · JPL
1	2002 PR205	MBA-I	18.24	670 m	multiple	2002–2018	06 Nov 2018	52	Disc.: La Palma Obs. Alt.: 2010 LT157	MPC · JPL
0	2002 PV205	MBA-I	19.2	430 m	multiple	2002–2019	10 Jun 2019	28	Disc.: Cerro Tololo	MPC · JPL
1	2002 PB206	MBA-I	18.8	520 m	multiple	2002–2019	04 Nov 2019	39	Disc.: Cerro Tololo; Added on 22 July 2020	MPC · JPL
2	2002 PE206	MBA-M	18.7	1.0 km	multiple	2002–2020	16 Nov 2020	53	Disc.: NEAT; Added on 17 January 2021	MPC · JPL

back to top
