= List of unnumbered trans-Neptunian objects: 2002 =

The following is a partial list of unnumbered trans-Neptunian objects for principal designations assigned within 2002. As of October 2026, it contains a total of 132 bodies. For more information see the description on the main page. Also see list for the previous and next year.

== 2002 ==
Designation	First Observed (discovered)		D (km)	Orbital description						Remarks	Refs
Designation	Date	Observer (Site)	D (km)	Class	a (AU)	e	i (°)	q (AU)	Q (AU)	Remarks	Refs
2002 AO_{217}	10 January 2002	Subaru Telescope, Maunakea (T09)	108	other TNO	37.4	0.10	2	33.5	41.3	albedo: 0.13	MPC · JPL
2002 AP_{217}	10 January 2002	Subaru Telescope, Maunakea (T09)	116	cubewano (cold)?	44.8	0.10	0	40.3	49.4	albedo: 0.152	MPC · JPL
2002 AQ_{217}	10 January 2002	Subaru Telescope, Maunakea (T09)	114	cubewano (cold)?	40.1	0.11	4	35.8	44.3	albedo: 0.152	MPC · JPL
2002 AR_{217}	10 January 2002	Subaru Telescope, Maunakea (T09)	113	other TNO	37.1	0.10	9	33.3	40.9	albedo: 0.13	MPC · JPL
2002 CA_{225}	7 February 2002	Kitt Peak (695)	172	cubewano (hot)?	45.7	0.12	5	40.2	51.2	albedo: 0.079	MPC · JPL
2002 CB_{225}	7 February 2002	M. W. Buie (695)	110	cubewano (cold)	44.1	0.08	4	40.6	47.6	albedo: 0.152	MPC · JPL
2002 CC_{251}	6 February 2002	Kitt Peak (695)	123	plutino?	39.5	0.15	6	33.6	45.5	albedo: 0.074	MPC · JPL
2002 CD_{251}	8 February 2002	M. W. Buie (695)	136	cubewano (cold)	42.7	0.01	1	42.1	43.2	albedo: 0.152	MPC · JPL
2002 CE_{251}	8 February 2002	M. W. Buie (695)	103	plutino	39.2	0.27	9	28.8	49.7	albedo: 0.074	MPC · JPL
2002 CO_{154}	6 February 2002	Kitt Peak (695)	171	cubewano (cold)?	42.7	0.00	3	42.7	42.7	albedo: 0.152	MPC · JPL
2002 CQ_{154}	6 February 2002	M. W. Buie (695)	141	cubewano (cold)?	44.5	0.06	3	42.0	46.9	albedo: 0.152	MPC · JPL
2002 CR_{154}	6 February 2002	Kitt Peak (695)	136	cubewano (cold)?	42.6	0.00	5	42.6	42.6	albedo: 0.152	MPC · JPL
2002 CS_{154}	6 February 2002	M. W. Buie (695)	131	cubewano (cold)	43.2	0.05	1	41.1	45.3	albedo: 0.152	MPC · JPL
2002 CT_{154}	6 February 2002	M. W. Buie (695)	121	cubewano (cold)	46.9	0.12	4	41.5	52.3	albedo: 0.152	MPC · JPL
2002 CU_{154}	6 February 2002	M. W. Buie (695)	136	cubewano (cold)	43.9	0.06	3	41.1	46.7	albedo: 0.152	MPC · JPL
2002 CV_{154}	6 February 2002	Kitt Peak (695)	285	cubewano (hot)?	45.7	0.07	15	42.4	49.0	albedo: 0.079	MPC · JPL
2002 CW_{154}	6 February 2002	Kitt Peak (695)	248	cubewano (hot)?	46.2	0.07	27	42.9	49.6	albedo: 0.079	MPC · JPL
2002 CX_{224}	6 February 2002	M. W. Buie (695)	305	cubewano (hot)?	46.5	0.13	17	40.2	52.7	albedo: 0.079	MPC · JPL
2002 CY_{154}	6 February 2002	M. W. Buie (695)	159	cubewano (cold)	44.3	0.08	1	41.0	47.7	albedo: 0.152	MPC · JPL
2002 CZ_{154}	6 February 2002	M. W. Buie (695)	148	cubewano (hot)	43.5	0.06	10	40.8	46.1	albedo: 0.079	MPC · JPL
2002 CZ_{248}	6 February 2002	M. W. Buie (695)	86	res · 3:7	53.4	0.39	6	32.4	74.4	albedo: 0.126	MPC · JPL
2002 FP_{7}	22 March 2002	Maunakea (568)	97	plutino?	39.5	0.19	9	31.9	47.1	albedo: 0.074	MPC · JPL
2002 FV_{6}	20 March 2002	B. Gladman, J. J. Kavelaars, A. Doressoundiram (568)	149	cubewano (cold)	47.0	0.16	3	39.7	54.4	albedo: 0.152	MPC · JPL
2002 FW_{36}	18 March 2002	M. W. Buie (695)	124	cubewano (cold)	42.9	0.02	2	42.0	43.9	albedo: 0.152	MPC · JPL
2002 FX_{36}	18 March 2002	M. W. Buie (695)	189	cubewano (cold)	44.2	0.05	1	42.1	46.4	albedo: 0.152	MPC · JPL
2002 FX_{6}	20 March 2002	Maunakea (568)	197	cubewano (hot)?	45.1	0.07	24	42.0	48.2	albedo: 0.079	MPC · JPL
2002 FY_{36}	18 March 2002	M. W. Buie (695)	104	centaur	31.9	0.30	5	22.5	41.3	albedo: 0.058	MPC · JPL
2002 GA_{32}	6 April 2002	M. W. Buie (807)	109	SDO	51.8	0.33	15	35.0	68.6	albedo: 0.124	MPC · JPL
2002 GA_{33}	7 April 2002	Maunakea (568)	65	cubewano (cold)?	43.0	0.00	1	43.0	43.0	albedo: 0.152	MPC · JPL
2002 GB_{32}	7 April 2002	M. W. Buie (807)	104	SDO	204.8	0.83	14	35.3	374.4	albedo: 0.124; BRmag: 1.39; taxonomy: IR	MPC · JPL
2002 GB_{33}	7 April 2002	Maunakea (568)	94	cubewano (cold)?	45.5	0.00	4	45.5	45.5	albedo: 0.152	MPC · JPL
2002 GC_{32}	7 April 2002	Cerro Tololo Observatory, La Serena (807)	118	cubewano (cold)?	43.5	0.05	3	41.3	45.6	albedo: 0.152	MPC · JPL
2002 GE_{32}	8 April 2002	M. W. Buie (807)	135	plutino	39.2	0.23	16	30.2	48.1	albedo: 0.074	MPC · JPL
2002 GH_{166}	9 April 2002	M. W. Buie (807)	171	plutino	39.1	0.19	9	31.6	46.7	albedo: 0.074	MPC · JPL
2002 GJ_{166}	9 April 2002	Cerro Tololo Observatory, La Serena (807)	129	plutino?	39.3	0.21	5	31.2	47.4	albedo: 0.074	MPC · JPL
2002 GK_{32}	8 April 2002	Cerro Tololo Observatory, La Serena (807)	179	cubewano (cold)?	43.8	0.02	3	43.1	44.5	albedo: 0.152	MPC · JPL
2002 GL_{32}	6 April 2002	M. W. Buie (807)	148	plutino	39.4	0.13	7	34.4	44.3	albedo: 0.074	MPC · JPL
2002 GM_{32}	6 April 2002	Cerro Tololo Observatory, La Serena (807)	58	other TNO	39.4	0.34	29	25.9	53.0	albedo: 0.13	MPC · JPL
2002 GN_{32}	6 April 2002	Cerro Tololo Observatory, La Serena (807)	268	plutino?	39.4	0.19	10	32.0	46.7	albedo: 0.074	MPC · JPL
2002 GO_{32}	6 April 2002	Cerro Tololo Observatory, La Serena (807)	148	plutino?	39.3	0.09	13	35.9	42.6	albedo: 0.074	MPC · JPL
2002 GQ_{32}	7 April 2002	Cerro Tololo Observatory, La Serena (807)	141	plutino?	39.4	0.18	6	32.4	46.5	albedo: 0.074	MPC · JPL
2002 GR_{32}	7 April 2002	M. W. Buie (807)	93	plutino	39.5	0.28	3	28.6	50.4	albedo: 0.074	MPC · JPL
2002 GS_{32}	8 April 2002	M. W. Buie (807)	114	res · 3:5?	42.0	0.11	4	37.5	46.6	albedo: 0.126; BRmag: 1.76; taxonomy: RR	MPC · JPL
2002 GT_{32}	8 April 2002	Cerro Tololo Observatory, La Serena (807)	117	plutino?	39.4	0.18	2	32.1	46.6	albedo: 0.074	MPC · JPL
2002 GU_{32}	8 April 2002	Cerro Tololo Observatory, La Serena (807)	204	plutino?	39.5	0.08	22	36.3	42.8	albedo: 0.074	MPC · JPL
2002 GW_{31}	6 April 2002	M. W. Buie (807)	177	plutino	39.4	0.24	3	29.8	49.0	albedo: 0.074	MPC · JPL
2002 GW_{32}	8 April 2002	M. W. Buie (807)	118	res · 4:5	34.9	0.08	6	32.2	37.6	albedo: 0.126	MPC · JPL
2002 GX_{31}	6 April 2002	Cerro Tololo Observatory, La Serena (807)	136	cubewano (cold)?	43.3	0.07	2	40.2	46.4	albedo: 0.152	MPC · JPL
2002 GY_{31}	6 April 2002	Cerro Tololo Observatory, La Serena (807)	171	cubewano (cold)?	43.5	0.02	1	42.6	44.4	albedo: 0.152	MPC · JPL
2002 PA_{153}	15 August 2002	M. J. Holman, J. J. Kavelaars, T. Grav, W. Fraser (807)	59	cubewano (cold)?	47.4	0.10	2	42.5	52.3	albedo: 0.152	MPC · JPL
2002 PA_{171}	5 August 2002	Maunakea (568)	152	cubewano (cold)	44.3	0.08	3	40.8	47.8	albedo: 0.152	MPC · JPL
2002 PB_{153}	15 August 2002	M. J. Holman, J. J. Kavelaars, T. Grav, W. Fraser (807)	52	cubewano (cold)?	48.9	0.11	3	43.4	54.3	albedo: 0.152	MPC · JPL
2002 PC_{153}	15 August 2002	M. J. Holman, J. J. Kavelaars, T. Grav, W. Fraser (807)	119	cubewano (cold)?	41.0	0.10	2	36.8	45.2	albedo: 0.152	MPC · JPL
2002 PC_{171}	5 August 2002	Maunakea (568)	101	cubewano (cold)	44.7	0.06	4	42.2	47.2	albedo: 0.152	MPC · JPL
2002 PD_{153}	15 August 2002	M. J. Holman, J. J. Kavelaars, T. Grav, W. Fraser (807)	63	cubewano (cold)?	43.3	0.10	0	39.0	47.6	albedo: 0.152	MPC · JPL
2002 PD_{155}	12 August 2002	M. W. Buie (807)	135	cubewano (hot)	43.3	0.01	6	43.0	43.6	albedo: 0.079	MPC · JPL
2002 PE_{149}	11 August 2002	Cerro Tololo Observatory, La Serena (807)	226	cubewano (hot)?	43.0	0.00	6	43.0	43.0	albedo: 0.079	MPC · JPL
2002 PE_{153}	15 August 2002	M. J. Holman, J. J. Kavelaars, T. Grav, W. Fraser (807)	171	cubewano (cold)?	42.0	0.11	1	37.6	46.4	albedo: 0.152	MPC · JPL
2002 PE_{155}	12 August 2002	M. W. Buie (807)	284	cubewano (hot)?	39.4	0.11	13	35.1	43.6	albedo: 0.079	MPC · JPL
2002 PF_{149}	11 August 2002	Cerro Tololo Observatory, La Serena (807)	163	cubewano (cold)?	42.9	0.00	4	42.9	42.9	albedo: 0.152	MPC · JPL
2002 PF_{153}	15 August 2002	M. J. Holman, J. J. Kavelaars, T. Grav, W. Fraser (807)	54	cubewano (cold)?	45.3	0.10	2	40.5	50.0	albedo: 0.152	MPC · JPL
2002 PG_{150}	11 August 2002	M. W. Buie (807)	95	res · 4:7	43.7	0.14	6	37.8	49.7	albedo: 0.126	MPC · JPL
2002 PG_{153}	15 August 2002	M. J. Holman, J. J. Kavelaars, T. Grav, W. Fraser (807)	74	res · 3:5	42.0	0.11	1	37.6	46.5	albedo: 0.126	MPC · JPL
2002 PH_{149}	11 August 2002	M. W. Buie (807)	225	cubewano (hot)?	50.0	0.20	6	39.9	60.2	albedo: 0.079	MPC · JPL
2002 PJ_{149}	11 August 2002	M. W. Buie (807)	401	cubewano (hot)?	44.9	0.12	8	39.6	50.2	albedo: 0.079	MPC · JPL
2002 PJ_{153}	13 August 2002	M. J. Holman, J. J. Kavelaars, T. Grav, W. Fraser (807)	56	cubewano (cold)?	48.5	0.10	2	43.5	53.5	albedo: 0.152	MPC · JPL
2002 PK_{149}	11 August 2002	M. W. Buie (807)	146	other TNO	39.1	0.10	5	35.1	43.0	albedo: 0.13	MPC · JPL
2002 PK_{153}	14 August 2002	M. J. Holman, J. J. Kavelaars, T. Grav, W. Fraser (807)	100	cubewano (cold)?	42.4	0.11	4	37.8	47.0	albedo: 0.152	MPC · JPL
2002 PL_{153}	14 August 2002	M. J. Holman, J. J. Kavelaars, T. Grav, W. Fraser (807)	83	cubewano (cold)?	40.8	0.10	1	36.7	44.8	albedo: 0.152	MPC · JPL
2002 PM_{153}	15 August 2002	M. J. Holman, J. J. Kavelaars, T. Grav, W. Fraser (807)	78	cubewano (hot)?	37.0	0.10	21	33.3	40.7	albedo: 0.079	MPC · JPL
2002 PN_{147}	9 August 2002	Cerro Tololo Observatory, La Serena (807)	187	cubewano (cold)?	44.4	0.00	2	44.4	44.4	albedo: 0.152	MPC · JPL
2002 PN_{149}	11 August 2002	M. W. Buie (807)	181	cubewano (cold)?	46.5	0.11	1	41.7	51.4	albedo: 0.152	MPC · JPL
2002 PN_{153}	14 August 2002	M. J. Holman, J. J. Kavelaars, T. Grav, W. Fraser (807)	134	cubewano (cold)?	48.0	0.10	2	43.1	52.9	albedo: 0.152	MPC · JPL
2002 PO_{149}	11 August 2002	M. W. Buie (807)	159	cubewano (cold)	44.0	0.06	1	41.3	46.7	albedo: 0.152	MPC · JPL
2002 PO_{153}	14 August 2002	M. J. Holman, J. J. Kavelaars, T. Grav, W. Fraser (807)	131	cubewano (hot)?	42.9	0.10	6	38.6	47.1	albedo: 0.079	MPC · JPL
2002 PP_{149}	11 August 2002	M. W. Buie (807)	197	cubewano (hot)?	41.0	0.09	35	37.4	44.6	albedo: 0.079; BRmag: 1.13	MPC · JPL
2002 PP_{153}	14 August 2002	M. J. Holman, J. J. Kavelaars, T. Grav, W. Fraser (807)	157	cubewano (cold)?	43.6	0.10	1	39.2	47.9	albedo: 0.152	MPC · JPL
2002 PQ_{149}	11 August 2002	Cerro Tololo Observatory, La Serena (807)	180	cubewano (hot)?	44.3	0.17	29	36.6	52.0	albedo: 0.079	MPC · JPL
2002 PR_{149}	11 August 2002	M. W. Buie (807)	116	cubewano (cold)	45.5	0.10	2	41.1	49.9	albedo: 0.152	MPC · JPL
2002 PR_{152}	12 August 2002	Cerro Tololo Observatory, La Serena (807)	62	cubewano (cold)?	43.2	0.00	2	43.2	43.2	albedo: 0.152	MPC · JPL
2002 PR_{170}	5 August 2002	Maunakea (568)	133	cubewano (cold)	44.2	0.09	1	40.4	47.9	albedo: 0.152	MPC · JPL
2002 PS_{152}	12 August 2002	Cerro Tololo Observatory, La Serena (807)	57	cubewano (cold)?	43.4	0.12	1	38.2	48.6	albedo: 0.152	MPC · JPL
2002 PS_{170}	5 August 2002	Maunakea (568)	92	cubewano (cold)	43.9	0.08	2	40.3	47.4	albedo: 0.152	MPC · JPL
2002 PT_{152}	12 August 2002	Cerro Tololo Observatory, La Serena (807)	103	cubewano (hot)?	45.7	0.00	6	45.7	45.7	albedo: 0.079	MPC · JPL
2002 PU_{152}	12 August 2002	Cerro Tololo Observatory, La Serena (807)	65	cubewano (cold)?	44.5	0.04	1	42.6	46.5	albedo: 0.152	MPC · JPL
2002 PU_{170}	5 August 2002	Maunakea (568)	141	twotino	47.8	0.23	2	37.1	58.6	albedo: 0.126	MPC · JPL
2002 PV_{152}	12 August 2002	Cerro Tololo Observatory, La Serena (807)	43	cubewano (cold)?	44.2	0.06	1	41.5	46.9	albedo: 0.152	MPC · JPL
2002 PW_{152}	12 August 2002	Cerro Tololo Observatory, La Serena (807)	75	cubewano (hot)?	45.4	0.00	7	45.4	45.4	albedo: 0.079	MPC · JPL
2002 PX_{152}	13 August 2002	Cerro Tololo Observatory, La Serena (807)	62	cubewano (cold)?	44.5	0.04	1	42.8	46.2	albedo: 0.152	MPC · JPL
2002 PX_{170}	5 August 2002	Maunakea (568)	118	cubewano (cold)	42.6	0.04	2	40.9	44.4	albedo: 0.152; alternate designation 2003 QZ_{113}	MPC · JPL
2002 PY_{152}	15 August 2002	Cerro Tololo Observatory, La Serena (807)	62	cubewano (hot)?	43.6	0.01	5	43.3	43.9	albedo: 0.079	MPC · JPL
2002 PY_{170}	5 August 2002	Maunakea (568)	85	cubewano (cold)	43.0	0.03	3	41.7	44.3	albedo: 0.152	MPC · JPL
2002 PZ_{152}	15 August 2002	M. J. Holman, J. J. Kavelaars, T. Grav, W. Fraser (807)	75	cubewano (hot)?	37.0	0.10	39	33.4	40.7	albedo: 0.079	MPC · JPL
2002 PZ_{170}	5 August 2002	Maunakea (568)	104	cubewano (cold)	42.6	0.04	1	40.9	44.2	albedo: 0.152	MPC · JPL
2002 RN_{109}	6 September 2002	LINEAR (704)	5	damocloid	695.7	1.00	58	2.7	1388.7	albedo: 0.048	MPC · JPL
2002 TA_{301}	6 October 2002	Maunakea (568)	31	cubewano (cold)?	44.2	0.00	3	44.2	44.2	albedo: 0.152	MPC · JPL
2002 TB_{301}	6 October 2002	Maunakea (568)	52	cubewano (cold)?	43.2	0.00	2	43.2	43.2	albedo: 0.152	MPC · JPL
2002 TC_{301}	6 October 2002	Maunakea (568)	43	cubewano (cold)?	45.8	0.00	1	45.8	45.8	albedo: 0.152	MPC · JPL
2002 TD_{301}	6 October 2002	Maunakea (568)	26	cubewano (cold)?	43.4	0.00	1	43.4	43.4	albedo: 0.152	MPC · JPL
2002 TE_{301}	6 October 2002	Maunakea (568)	31	cubewano (hot)?	45.2	0.00	8	45.2	45.2	albedo: 0.079	MPC · JPL
2002 TF_{301}	6 October 2002	Maunakea (568)	23	cubewano (cold)?	44.7	0.00	3	44.7	44.7	albedo: 0.152	MPC · JPL
2002 TG_{301}	6 October 2002	Maunakea (568)	39	cubewano (cold)?	45.6	0.00	2	45.6	45.6	albedo: 0.152	MPC · JPL
2002 TH_{301}	6 October 2002	D. Kinoshita, K. Muroi (568)	67	plutino	39.6	0.04	2	38.2	41.0	albedo: 0.074	MPC · JPL
2002 TJ_{301}	6 October 2002	Maunakea (568)	23	cubewano (cold)?	43.7	0.03	2	42.2	45.1	albedo: 0.152	MPC · JPL
2002 TL_{301}	6 October 2002	Maunakea (568)	21	cubewano (cold)?	43.3	0.05	2	41.3	45.3	albedo: 0.152	MPC · JPL
2002 TM_{301}	6 October 2002	Maunakea (568)	56	plutino?	39.4	0.30	7	27.4	51.3	albedo: 0.074	MPC · JPL
2002 TZ_{300}	6 October 2002	D. Kinoshita, K. Muroi (568)	96	cubewano (cold)?	43.8	0.02	3	43.1	44.5	albedo: 0.152	MPC · JPL
2002 VA_{95}	12 November 2002	Kitt Peak (695)	75	cubewano (cold)?	44.8	0.09	2	40.6	49.0	albedo: 0.152	MPC · JPL
2002 VB_{131}	7 November 2002	M. W. Buie (695)	179	cubewano (cold)	43.3	0.04	2	41.7	44.9	albedo: 0.152	MPC · JPL
2002 VB_{95}	12 November 2002	Kitt Peak (695)	81	plutino?	39.4	0.11	12	35.2	43.5	albedo: 0.074	MPC · JPL
2002 VC_{131}	7 November 2002	Kitt Peak (695)	179	cubewano (cold)?	46.3	0.00	2	46.3	46.3	albedo: 0.152	MPC · JPL
2002 VC_{95}	12 November 2002	Kitt Peak (695)	86	cubewano (cold)?	46.9	0.00	3	46.9	46.9	albedo: 0.152	MPC · JPL
2002 VD_{131}	7 November 2002	M. W. Buie (695)	163	cubewano (cold)	45.3	0.06	1	42.4	48.2	binary: 40 km; albedo: 0.152; BRmag: 1.21	MPC · JPL
2002 VD_{138}	9 November 2002	M. W. Buie (695)	108	plutino	39.7	0.15	3	33.9	45.6	albedo: 0.074	MPC · JPL
2002 VD_{95}	12 November 2002	R. L. Allen, J. J. Kavelaars (695)	114	cubewano (hot)?	38.3	0.10	23	34.4	42.2	albedo: 0.079	MPC · JPL
2002 VE_{130}	7 November 2002	M. W. Buie (695)	181	cubewano (cold)	44.8	0.06	3	42.0	47.6	albedo: 0.152	MPC · JPL
2002 VE_{131}	7 November 2002	Kitt Peak (695)	237	cubewano (hot)?	45.7	0.18	19	37.4	54.1	albedo: 0.079	MPC · JPL
2002 VF_{130}	7 November 2002	M. W. Buie (695)	193	cubewano (hot)?	46.1	0.12	20	40.7	51.6	binary: 135 km; albedo: 0.079	MPC · JPL
2002 VF_{131}	7 November 2002	M. W. Buie (695)	143	cubewano (cold)	44.5	0.06	2	41.7	47.3	albedo: 0.152	MPC · JPL
2002 VV_{130}	7 November 2002	M. W. Buie (695)	117	res · 3:5	42.6	0.17	2	35.2	50.0	albedo: 0.126; BRmag: 1.92; taxonomy: RR	MPC · JPL
2002 VW_{130}	7 November 2002	Kitt Peak (695)	142	cubewano (cold)?	46.0	0.08	2	42.1	49.8	albedo: 0.152	MPC · JPL
2002 VX_{130}	7 November 2002	M. W. Buie (695)	104	plutino	39.8	0.23	1	30.8	48.8	albedo: 0.074	MPC · JPL
2002 VY_{130}	7 November 2002	Kitt Peak (695)	102	plutino?	39.5	0.21	28	31.1	47.9	albedo: 0.074	MPC · JPL
2002 VZ_{130}	9 November 2002	Kitt Peak (695)	164	cubewano (hot)?	45.8	0.09	8	41.6	50.0	albedo: 0.079	MPC · JPL
2002 VZ_{94}	11 November 2002	Kitt Peak (695)	136	cubewano (cold)?	45.7	0.08	3	42.0	49.5	albedo: 0.152	MPC · JPL
2002 WL_{21}	28 November 2002	Maunakea (568)	99	cubewano (cold)	43.4	0.05	3	41.5	45.3	albedo: 0.152	MPC · JPL
2002 XD_{91}	4 December 2002	Kitt Peak (695)	148	plutino?	39.5	0.22	7	31.0	48.0	albedo: 0.074	MPC · JPL
2002 XE_{91}	4 December 2002	M. W. Buie (695)	314	cubewano (hot)	46.4	0.12	6	41.0	51.8	albedo: 0.079	MPC · JPL
2002 XF_{91}	4 December 2002	Kitt Peak (695)	142	cubewano (cold)?	44.6	0.11	4	39.6	49.7	albedo: 0.152	MPC · JPL
2002 XG_{91}	4 December 2002	Kitt Peak (695)	148	plutino?	39.5	0.22	15	30.6	48.4	albedo: 0.074	MPC · JPL
2002 XJ_{91}	5 December 2002	M. W. Buie (695)	81	other TNO	34.8	0.10	9	31.3	38.3	albedo: 0.13	MPC · JPL
2002 XP_{114}	4 December 2002	Kitt Peak (695)	90	SDO	32.2	0.10	19	28.9	35.5	albedo: 0.124	MPC · JPL

back to top
