= List of minor planets: 845001–846000 =

The following is a partial list of minor planets, running from minor-planet number 845001 through 846000, inclusive. The primary data for this and other partial lists is based on JPL's "Small-Body Orbital Elements" and data available from the Minor Planet Center. Critical list information is also provided by the MPC, unless otherwise specified from Lowell Observatory. A detailed description of the table's columns and additional sources are given on the main page including a complete list of every page in this series, and a statistical break-up on the dynamical classification of minor planets.

Also see the summary list of all named bodies in numerical and alphabetical order, and the corresponding naming citations for the number range of this particular list. New namings may only be added to this list after official publication, as the preannouncement of names is condemned by the Working Group for Small Bodies Nomenclature of the International Astronomical Union.

Near-Earth obj.	MBA (inner)	MBA (outer)	Centaur
Mars-crosser	MBA (middle)	Jupiter trojan	Trans-Neptunian obj.
Unclassified

== 845001–845100 ==
Designation			Discovery			Properties		Ref
Permanent	Provisional	Named after	Date	Site	Discoverer(s)	Category	Diam.	Ref
845001	2017 QG_{80}	—	March 6, 2016	Haleakala	Pan-STARRS 1	H	360 m	MPC · JPL
845002	2017 QH_{81}	—	August 28, 2017	Mount Lemmon	Mount Lemmon Survey	·	490 m	MPC · JPL
845003	2017 QT_{81}	—	August 31, 2017	Haleakala	Pan-STARRS 1	·	680 m	MPC · JPL
845004	2017 QN_{87}	—	July 5, 2010	WISE	WISE	·	2.7 km	MPC · JPL
845005	2017 QG_{88}	—	April 18, 2015	Cerro Tololo	DECam	3:2 · SHU	3.7 km	MPC · JPL
845006	2017 QJ_{89}	—	October 3, 2013	Haleakala	Pan-STARRS 1	·	960 m	MPC · JPL
845007	2017 QK_{89}	—	August 31, 2017	Haleakala	Pan-STARRS 1	·	870 m	MPC · JPL
845008	2017 QL_{89}	—	October 23, 2006	Kitt Peak	Spacewatch	·	790 m	MPC · JPL
845009	2017 QG_{90}	—	August 31, 2017	Mount Lemmon	Mount Lemmon Survey	·	970 m	MPC · JPL
845010	2017 QD_{92}	—	August 16, 2017	Haleakala	Pan-STARRS 1	·	1.4 km	MPC · JPL
845011	2017 QH_{92}	—	August 28, 2017	Mount Lemmon	Mount Lemmon Survey	·	400 m	MPC · JPL
845012	2017 QL_{92}	—	August 31, 2017	Haleakala	Pan-STARRS 1	·	640 m	MPC · JPL
845013	2017 QJ_{93}	—	August 31, 2017	Haleakala	Pan-STARRS 1	EUN	690 m	MPC · JPL
845014	2017 QQ_{93}	—	August 22, 2017	Haleakala	Pan-STARRS 1	·	1.2 km	MPC · JPL
845015	2017 QT_{93}	—	August 16, 2017	Haleakala	Pan-STARRS 1	VER	1.8 km	MPC · JPL
845016	2017 QF_{94}	—	August 31, 2017	Haleakala	Pan-STARRS 1	·	860 m	MPC · JPL
845017	2017 QR_{95}	—	August 23, 2017	Haleakala	Pan-STARRS 1	·	500 m	MPC · JPL
845018	2017 QA_{96}	—	August 18, 2017	Haleakala	Pan-STARRS 1	·	650 m	MPC · JPL
845019	2017 QE_{96}	—	August 31, 2017	Haleakala	Pan-STARRS 1	·	940 m	MPC · JPL
845020	2017 QY_{102}	—	August 30, 2017	Mount Lemmon	Mount Lemmon Survey	H	410 m	MPC · JPL
845021	2017 QN_{103}	—	August 31, 2017	Haleakala	Pan-STARRS 1	H	360 m	MPC · JPL
845022	2017 QR_{103}	—	August 18, 2017	Haleakala	Pan-STARRS 1	H	340 m	MPC · JPL
845023	2017 QS_{110}	—	October 22, 2012	Haleakala	Pan-STARRS 1	·	1.6 km	MPC · JPL
845024	2017 QY_{113}	—	March 16, 2012	Mount Lemmon	Mount Lemmon Survey	·	960 m	MPC · JPL
845025	2017 QB_{116}	—	February 16, 2015	Haleakala	Pan-STARRS 1	EOS	1.2 km	MPC · JPL
845026	2017 QW_{117}	—	August 17, 2017	Haleakala	Pan-STARRS 1	VER	1.9 km	MPC · JPL
845027	2017 QD_{118}	—	August 31, 2017	Haleakala	Pan-STARRS 1	·	1.0 km	MPC · JPL
845028	2017 QG_{120}	—	March 31, 2016	Haleakala	Pan-STARRS 1	·	460 m	MPC · JPL
845029	2017 QZ_{120}	—	August 28, 2017	Mount Lemmon	Mount Lemmon Survey	·	510 m	MPC · JPL
845030	2017 QB_{122}	—	October 3, 2013	Mount Lemmon	Mount Lemmon Survey	·	840 m	MPC · JPL
845031	2017 QE_{122}	—	August 31, 2017	Kitt Peak	Spacewatch	·	1.6 km	MPC · JPL
845032	2017 QC_{124}	—	August 31, 2017	Mount Lemmon	Mount Lemmon Survey	·	1.6 km	MPC · JPL
845033	2017 QR_{125}	—	November 21, 2001	Sacramento Peak	SDSS	(5)	890 m	MPC · JPL
845034	2017 QU_{125}	—	July 30, 2017	Haleakala	Pan-STARRS 1	EUN	730 m	MPC · JPL
845035	2017 QF_{126}	—	August 31, 2017	Haleakala	Pan-STARRS 1	·	930 m	MPC · JPL
845036	2017 QC_{127}	—	August 18, 2017	Haleakala	Pan-STARRS 1	·	680 m	MPC · JPL
845037	2017 QB_{128}	—	August 31, 2017	Haleakala	Pan-STARRS 1	·	1.0 km	MPC · JPL
845038	2017 QF_{128}	—	August 20, 2017	Haleakala	Pan-STARRS 1	·	730 m	MPC · JPL
845039	2017 QL_{129}	—	August 28, 2017	Mount Lemmon	Mount Lemmon Survey	·	700 m	MPC · JPL
845040	2017 QH_{130}	—	August 22, 2017	Haleakala	Pan-STARRS 1	·	1.1 km	MPC · JPL
845041	2017 QJ_{130}	—	May 1, 2016	Cerro Tololo	DECam	·	790 m	MPC · JPL
845042	2017 QX_{130}	—	August 31, 2017	Mount Lemmon	Mount Lemmon Survey	·	740 m	MPC · JPL
845043	2017 QU_{134}	—	August 18, 2017	Haleakala	Pan-STARRS 1	V	490 m	MPC · JPL
845044	2017 QG_{135}	—	August 20, 2017	Haleakala	Pan-STARRS 1	·	590 m	MPC · JPL
845045	2017 QX_{139}	—	December 3, 2014	Haleakala	Pan-STARRS 1	·	510 m	MPC · JPL
845046	2017 QK_{140}	—	August 16, 2017	Haleakala	Pan-STARRS 1	·	680 m	MPC · JPL
845047	2017 QK_{141}	—	April 18, 2015	Cerro Tololo	DECam	·	1.8 km	MPC · JPL
845048	2017 QD_{142}	—	August 31, 2017	Haleakala	Pan-STARRS 1	·	620 m	MPC · JPL
845049	2017 QQ_{142}	—	August 31, 2017	Haleakala	Pan-STARRS 1	·	680 m	MPC · JPL
845050	2017 QP_{143}	—	May 1, 2016	Cerro Tololo	DECam	·	730 m	MPC · JPL
845051	2017 QO_{144}	—	August 17, 2017	Haleakala	Pan-STARRS 1	KOR	850 m	MPC · JPL
845052	2017 QG_{198}	—	January 20, 2015	Haleakala	Pan-STARRS 1	HOF	1.6 km	MPC · JPL
845053	2017 QJ_{198}	—	August 17, 2017	Haleakala	Pan-STARRS 1	·	730 m	MPC · JPL
845054	2017 QC_{219}	—	August 16, 2017	Haleakala	Pan-STARRS 1	·	2.5 km	MPC · JPL
845055	2017 RP	—	September 2, 2017	Haleakala	Pan-STARRS 1	·	430 m	MPC · JPL
845056	2017 RW_{5}	—	January 30, 2011	Haleakala	Pan-STARRS 1	MAR	610 m	MPC · JPL
845057	2017 RW_{10}	—	December 10, 2014	Mount Lemmon	Mount Lemmon Survey	·	530 m	MPC · JPL
845058	2017 RF_{18}	—	July 30, 2017	Haleakala	Pan-STARRS 1	·	1.6 km	MPC · JPL
845059	2017 RP_{19}	—	December 29, 2005	Mount Lemmon	Mount Lemmon Survey	·	1.0 km	MPC · JPL
845060	2017 RK_{22}	—	September 3, 2013	Haleakala	Pan-STARRS 1	·	540 m	MPC · JPL
845061	2017 RB_{24}	—	November 8, 2007	Kitt Peak	Spacewatch	·	530 m	MPC · JPL
845062	2017 RY_{26}	—	September 13, 2017	Haleakala	Pan-STARRS 1	·	800 m	MPC · JPL
845063	2017 RF_{28}	—	October 1, 2013	Mount Lemmon	Mount Lemmon Survey	EUN	750 m	MPC · JPL
845064	2017 RZ_{29}	—	November 7, 2010	Kitt Peak	Spacewatch	3:2 · SHU	4.6 km	MPC · JPL
845065	2017 RM_{32}	—	February 11, 2015	Mount Lemmon	Mount Lemmon Survey	NYS	890 m	MPC · JPL
845066	2017 RE_{41}	—	September 2, 2017	Mount Lemmon	Mount Lemmon Survey	·	480 m	MPC · JPL
845067	2017 RF_{43}	—	July 22, 2017	Haleakala	Pan-STARRS 1	EUN	730 m	MPC · JPL
845068	2017 RA_{48}	—	March 31, 2016	Haleakala	Pan-STARRS 1	·	840 m	MPC · JPL
845069	2017 RP_{50}	—	April 22, 2009	Mount Lemmon	Mount Lemmon Survey	·	930 m	MPC · JPL
845070	2017 RX_{51}	—	September 25, 2006	Mount Lemmon	Mount Lemmon Survey	THM	1.4 km	MPC · JPL
845071	2017 RH_{55}	—	September 25, 2013	Mount Lemmon	Mount Lemmon Survey	·	680 m	MPC · JPL
845072	2017 RS_{55}	—	August 16, 2017	Haleakala	Pan-STARRS 1	·	980 m	MPC · JPL
845073	2017 RT_{55}	—	May 22, 2015	Cerro Tololo	DECam	·	1.2 km	MPC · JPL
845074	2017 RT_{59}	—	August 31, 2017	Haleakala	Pan-STARRS 1	·	530 m	MPC · JPL
845075	2017 RH_{60}	—	November 20, 2009	Kitt Peak	Spacewatch	·	910 m	MPC · JPL
845076	2017 RS_{62}	—	May 1, 2016	Cerro Tololo	DECam	·	1.0 km	MPC · JPL
845077	2017 RX_{62}	—	September 14, 2017	Haleakala	Pan-STARRS 1	·	510 m	MPC · JPL
845078	2017 RJ_{70}	—	October 1, 2008	Mount Lemmon	Mount Lemmon Survey	·	1.3 km	MPC · JPL
845079	2017 RD_{76}	—	March 16, 2013	Mount Lemmon	Mount Lemmon Survey	·	560 m	MPC · JPL
845080	2017 RU_{77}	—	October 29, 2014	Kitt Peak	Spacewatch	·	580 m	MPC · JPL
845081	2017 RJ_{79}	—	September 29, 2009	Mount Lemmon	Mount Lemmon Survey	·	740 m	MPC · JPL
845082	2017 RP_{79}	—	April 27, 2016	Mount Lemmon	Mount Lemmon Survey	·	750 m	MPC · JPL
845083	2017 RR_{82}	—	October 14, 2001	Sacramento Peak	SDSS	·	1.6 km	MPC · JPL
845084	2017 RA_{85}	—	September 15, 2017	Haleakala	Pan-STARRS 1	·	890 m	MPC · JPL
845085	2017 RG_{85}	—	September 26, 2005	Kitt Peak	Spacewatch	·	650 m	MPC · JPL
845086	2017 RH_{87}	—	October 5, 2013	Haleakala	Pan-STARRS 1	RAF	580 m	MPC · JPL
845087	2017 RK_{91}	—	October 5, 2002	Sacramento Peak	SDSS	·	910 m	MPC · JPL
845088	2017 RN_{92}	—	August 24, 2017	Haleakala	Pan-STARRS 1	·	1.1 km	MPC · JPL
845089	2017 RF_{93}	—	March 24, 2009	Mount Lemmon	Mount Lemmon Survey	·	2.3 km	MPC · JPL
845090	2017 RY_{97}	—	April 30, 2016	Haleakala	Pan-STARRS 1	·	1.0 km	MPC · JPL
845091	2017 RW_{99}	—	April 27, 2012	Haleakala	Pan-STARRS 1	·	710 m	MPC · JPL
845092	2017 RK_{103}	—	September 11, 2017	Haleakala	Pan-STARRS 1	·	790 m	MPC · JPL
845093	2017 RT_{103}	—	August 31, 2017	Mount Lemmon	Mount Lemmon Survey	·	770 m	MPC · JPL
845094	2017 RE_{106}	—	August 31, 2017	Mount Lemmon	Mount Lemmon Survey	·	1.4 km	MPC · JPL
845095	2017 RN_{106}	—	October 21, 2012	Haleakala	Pan-STARRS 1	·	1.4 km	MPC · JPL
845096	2017 RS_{109}	—	April 1, 2016	Haleakala	Pan-STARRS 1	·	460 m	MPC · JPL
845097	2017 RP_{111}	—	September 1, 2017	Haleakala	Pan-STARRS 1	(1547)	1.4 km	MPC · JPL
845098	2017 RW_{111}	—	September 1, 2017	Haleakala	Pan-STARRS 1	·	900 m	MPC · JPL
845099	2017 RP_{112}	—	September 13, 2017	Haleakala	Pan-STARRS 1	·	1.2 km	MPC · JPL
845100	2017 RJ_{114}	—	September 19, 1995	Kitt Peak	Spacewatch	MAS	540 m	MPC · JPL

== 845101–845200 ==
back to top

Designation			Discovery			Properties		Ref
Permanent	Provisional	Named after	Date	Site	Discoverer(s)	Category	Diam.	Ref
845101	2017 RQ_{115}	—	September 21, 2009	Mount Lemmon	Mount Lemmon Survey	(5)	780 m	MPC · JPL
845102	2017 RR_{115}	—	September 1, 2017	Haleakala	Pan-STARRS 1	·	810 m	MPC · JPL
845103	2017 RP_{117}	—	January 21, 2010	WISE	WISE	·	2.7 km	MPC · JPL
845104	2017 RL_{118}	—	September 14, 2017	Haleakala	Pan-STARRS 1	·	1.3 km	MPC · JPL
845105	2017 RZ_{118}	—	January 20, 2010	WISE	WISE	·	1.9 km	MPC · JPL
845106	2017 RD_{119}	—	September 14, 2017	Haleakala	Pan-STARRS 1	H	400 m	MPC · JPL
845107	2017 RM_{119}	—	October 22, 2003	Sacramento Peak	SDSS	·	680 m	MPC · JPL
845108	2017 RJ_{120}	—	September 14, 2017	Haleakala	Pan-STARRS 1	·	920 m	MPC · JPL
845109	2017 RF_{121}	—	September 3, 2017	Haleakala	Pan-STARRS 1	EUN	660 m	MPC · JPL
845110	2017 RQ_{121}	—	September 1, 2017	Haleakala	Pan-STARRS 1	·	1.1 km	MPC · JPL
845111	2017 RK_{128}	—	September 1, 2017	Haleakala	Pan-STARRS 1	EUN	680 m	MPC · JPL
845112	2017 RV_{128}	—	May 1, 2016	Cerro Tololo	DECam	(5)	660 m	MPC · JPL
845113	2017 RV_{130}	—	April 19, 2015	Cerro Tololo	DECam	·	1.3 km	MPC · JPL
845114	2017 RX_{132}	—	April 5, 2016	Haleakala	Pan-STARRS 1	·	1.1 km	MPC · JPL
845115	2017 RF_{133}	—	September 15, 2017	Haleakala	Pan-STARRS 1	KOR	1.0 km	MPC · JPL
845116	2017 RU_{133}	—	September 1, 2017	Haleakala	Pan-STARRS 1	·	820 m	MPC · JPL
845117	2017 RU_{134}	—	December 22, 2008	Kitt Peak	Spacewatch	DOR	2.1 km	MPC · JPL
845118	2017 RJ_{136}	—	May 1, 2016	Cerro Tololo	DECam	·	820 m	MPC · JPL
845119	2017 RR_{136}	—	September 1, 2017	Mount Lemmon	Mount Lemmon Survey	·	790 m	MPC · JPL
845120	2017 RK_{137}	—	September 6, 2017	Haleakala	Pan-STARRS 1	·	1.2 km	MPC · JPL
845121	2017 RO_{137}	—	September 2, 2017	Haleakala	Pan-STARRS 1	MAR	670 m	MPC · JPL
845122	2017 RP_{138}	—	September 14, 2017	Haleakala	Pan-STARRS 1	BRG	860 m	MPC · JPL
845123	2017 RU_{138}	—	September 1, 2017	Haleakala	Pan-STARRS 1	·	920 m	MPC · JPL
845124	2017 RF_{139}	—	September 1, 2017	Haleakala	Pan-STARRS 1	EUN	800 m	MPC · JPL
845125	2017 RG_{140}	—	May 1, 2016	Haleakala	Pan-STARRS 1	·	970 m	MPC · JPL
845126	2017 RJ_{140}	—	September 2, 2017	Haleakala	Pan-STARRS 1	BRA	1.2 km	MPC · JPL
845127	2017 RH_{142}	—	September 1, 2017	Haleakala	Pan-STARRS 1	(5)	940 m	MPC · JPL
845128	2017 RW_{158}	—	August 8, 2010	WISE	WISE	URS	2.4 km	MPC · JPL
845129	2017 RJ_{177}	—	September 2, 2017	Haleakala	Pan-STARRS 1	·	1.2 km	MPC · JPL
845130	2017 RK_{177}	—	September 8, 2017	Haleakala	Pan-STARRS 1	·	1.5 km	MPC · JPL
845131	2017 SX_{1}	—	July 24, 2017	Haleakala	Pan-STARRS 1	·	1.7 km	MPC · JPL
845132	2017 SH_{4}	—	April 4, 2008	Mount Lemmon	Mount Lemmon Survey	·	840 m	MPC · JPL
845133	2017 SR_{4}	—	October 24, 2013	Mount Lemmon	Mount Lemmon Survey	ADE	1.1 km	MPC · JPL
845134	2017 SO_{5}	—	June 18, 2013	Haleakala	Pan-STARRS 1	V	440 m	MPC · JPL
845135	2017 SZ_{5}	—	October 13, 2013	Mount Lemmon	Mount Lemmon Survey	·	860 m	MPC · JPL
845136	2017 SL_{7}	—	January 14, 2015	Haleakala	Pan-STARRS 1	V	420 m	MPC · JPL
845137	2017 SW_{8}	—	June 2, 2010	WISE	WISE	·	1.9 km	MPC · JPL
845138	2017 SY_{13}	—	February 14, 2010	Mount Lemmon	Mount Lemmon Survey	·	1.2 km	MPC · JPL
845139	2017 SZ_{18}	—	May 5, 2008	Mount Lemmon	Mount Lemmon Survey	·	1.4 km	MPC · JPL
845140	2017 SC_{22}	—	October 18, 2009	Mount Lemmon	Mount Lemmon Survey	·	730 m	MPC · JPL
845141	2017 SQ_{26}	—	November 24, 2000	Kitt Peak	Deep Lens Survey	·	980 m	MPC · JPL
845142	2017 SO_{28}	—	August 3, 2017	Haleakala	Pan-STARRS 1	(5)	1.0 km	MPC · JPL
845143	2017 SJ_{31}	—	May 27, 2008	Kitt Peak	Spacewatch	·	680 m	MPC · JPL
845144	2017 SA_{35}	—	September 25, 2017	Haleakala	Pan-STARRS 1	·	2.2 km	MPC · JPL
845145	2017 SO_{36}	—	October 27, 2006	Catalina	CSS	·	2.5 km	MPC · JPL
845146	2017 SW_{36}	—	September 17, 2013	Mount Lemmon	Mount Lemmon Survey	·	860 m	MPC · JPL
845147	2017 SY_{45}	—	April 17, 2015	Cerro Tololo	DECam	EOS	1.6 km	MPC · JPL
845148	2017 SH_{47}	—	September 19, 2003	Kitt Peak	Spacewatch	·	1.5 km	MPC · JPL
845149	2017 SU_{47}	—	August 31, 2017	Mount Lemmon	Mount Lemmon Survey	·	790 m	MPC · JPL
845150	2017 SW_{48}	—	April 18, 2015	Cerro Tololo	DECam	·	2.0 km	MPC · JPL
845151	2017 SS_{50}	—	February 10, 2008	Kitt Peak	Spacewatch	H	360 m	MPC · JPL
845152	2017 SH_{52}	—	September 19, 2014	Haleakala	Pan-STARRS 1	·	660 m	MPC · JPL
845153	2017 SU_{52}	—	July 29, 2000	Cerro Tololo	Deep Ecliptic Survey	·	710 m	MPC · JPL
845154	2017 SS_{53}	—	February 24, 2015	Haleakala	Pan-STARRS 1	EUN	810 m	MPC · JPL
845155	2017 SM_{67}	—	October 2, 2013	Mount Lemmon	Mount Lemmon Survey	·	740 m	MPC · JPL
845156	2017 SM_{69}	—	July 13, 2013	Haleakala	Pan-STARRS 1	·	850 m	MPC · JPL
845157	2017 SV_{70}	—	September 17, 2017	Haleakala	Pan-STARRS 1	·	2.0 km	MPC · JPL
845158	2017 SP_{71}	—	January 22, 2004	Mauna Kea	Allen, R. L.	·	1.5 km	MPC · JPL
845159	2017 SW_{74}	—	September 3, 2008	Kitt Peak	Spacewatch	·	1.4 km	MPC · JPL
845160	2017 SZ_{75}	—	January 17, 2015	Haleakala	Pan-STARRS 1	·	1.1 km	MPC · JPL
845161	2017 SH_{76}	—	September 17, 2017	Haleakala	Pan-STARRS 1	·	1.2 km	MPC · JPL
845162	2017 SP_{77}	—	August 31, 2017	Haleakala	Pan-STARRS 1	EOS	1.2 km	MPC · JPL
845163	2017 SG_{78}	—	August 31, 2017	Haleakala	Pan-STARRS 1	·	1.2 km	MPC · JPL
845164	2017 SC_{79}	—	August 6, 2017	Haleakala	Pan-STARRS 1	·	1.3 km	MPC · JPL
845165	2017 SU_{79}	—	May 1, 2016	Cerro Tololo	DECam	·	640 m	MPC · JPL
845166	2017 SO_{80}	—	October 12, 2009	Mount Lemmon	Mount Lemmon Survey	·	780 m	MPC · JPL
845167	2017 SP_{81}	—	April 15, 2010	Mount Lemmon	Mount Lemmon Survey	THB	2.4 km	MPC · JPL
845168	2017 SU_{81}	—	September 8, 1996	Kitt Peak	Spacewatch	·	820 m	MPC · JPL
845169	2017 SU_{89}	—	April 19, 2012	Mount Lemmon	Mount Lemmon Survey	EUN	770 m	MPC · JPL
845170	2017 SZ_{96}	—	August 27, 2009	Kitt Peak	Spacewatch	3:2 · SHU	4.0 km	MPC · JPL
845171	2017 SN_{99}	—	December 20, 2014	Kitt Peak	Spacewatch	·	750 m	MPC · JPL
845172	2017 SJ_{105}	—	July 30, 2017	Haleakala	Pan-STARRS 1	·	710 m	MPC · JPL
845173	2017 SK_{105}	—	May 24, 2010	WISE	WISE	·	510 m	MPC · JPL
845174	2017 SL_{106}	—	October 14, 2001	Kitt Peak	Spacewatch	·	1.7 km	MPC · JPL
845175	2017 SP_{106}	—	September 20, 2017	Nogales	M. Schwartz, P. R. Holvorcem	EUN	790 m	MPC · JPL
845176	2017 SE_{109}	—	March 31, 2016	Mount Lemmon	Mount Lemmon Survey	·	880 m	MPC · JPL
845177	2017 SW_{123}	—	October 2, 2013	Haleakala	Pan-STARRS 1	·	670 m	MPC · JPL
845178	2017 SH_{127}	—	September 28, 2009	Mount Lemmon	Mount Lemmon Survey	·	890 m	MPC · JPL
845179	2017 SD_{128}	—	August 1, 2017	Haleakala	Pan-STARRS 1	RAF	620 m	MPC · JPL
845180	2017 SP_{133}	—	September 24, 2017	Haleakala	Pan-STARRS 1	EOS	1.1 km	MPC · JPL
845181	2017 SX_{135}	—	September 18, 2017	Haleakala	Pan-STARRS 1	·	1.4 km	MPC · JPL
845182	2017 SX_{137}	—	September 24, 2017	Haleakala	Pan-STARRS 1	·	880 m	MPC · JPL
845183	2017 SE_{138}	—	April 18, 2015	Cerro Tololo	DECam	·	910 m	MPC · JPL
845184	2017 SM_{139}	—	September 24, 2017	Haleakala	Pan-STARRS 1	·	1.2 km	MPC · JPL
845185	2017 ST_{142}	—	September 19, 2017	Haleakala	Pan-STARRS 1	·	1.1 km	MPC · JPL
845186	2017 SS_{144}	—	September 17, 2017	Haleakala	Pan-STARRS 1	·	970 m	MPC · JPL
845187	2017 SW_{145}	—	September 22, 2017	Haleakala	Pan-STARRS 1	·	1.1 km	MPC · JPL
845188	2017 SZ_{145}	—	September 17, 2017	Haleakala	Pan-STARRS 1	·	970 m	MPC · JPL
845189	2017 SV_{148}	—	September 16, 2017	Haleakala	Pan-STARRS 1	·	830 m	MPC · JPL
845190	2017 SD_{150}	—	September 17, 2017	Haleakala	Pan-STARRS 1	·	730 m	MPC · JPL
845191	2017 SO_{150}	—	September 24, 2017	Haleakala	Pan-STARRS 1	·	490 m	MPC · JPL
845192	2017 SU_{154}	—	September 25, 2017	Haleakala	Pan-STARRS 1	·	680 m	MPC · JPL
845193	2017 SA_{158}	—	September 19, 2017	Haleakala	Pan-STARRS 1	·	1.1 km	MPC · JPL
845194	2017 SO_{159}	—	September 17, 2017	Haleakala	Pan-STARRS 1	MAR	750 m	MPC · JPL
845195	2017 SK_{160}	—	September 22, 2017	Haleakala	Pan-STARRS 1	·	1.1 km	MPC · JPL
845196	2017 SH_{164}	—	September 30, 2017	Haleakala	Pan-STARRS 1	EUN	720 m	MPC · JPL
845197	2017 SU_{164}	—	September 27, 2017	Haleakala	Pan-STARRS 1	·	1.1 km	MPC · JPL
845198	2017 SJ_{166}	—	September 24, 2017	Kitt Peak	Spacewatch	EUN	820 m	MPC · JPL
845199	2017 SM_{167}	—	September 29, 2017	Haleakala	Pan-STARRS 1	·	990 m	MPC · JPL
845200	2017 SZ_{168}	—	September 22, 2017	Haleakala	Pan-STARRS 1	(5)	640 m	MPC · JPL

== 845201–845300 ==
back to top

Designation			Discovery			Properties		Ref
Permanent	Provisional	Named after	Date	Site	Discoverer(s)	Category	Diam.	Ref
845201	2017 SN_{169}	—	September 24, 2017	Haleakala	Pan-STARRS 1	EUN	850 m	MPC · JPL
845202	2017 SL_{172}	—	September 22, 2017	Haleakala	Pan-STARRS 1	·	1.2 km	MPC · JPL
845203	2017 SF_{175}	—	September 21, 2017	Haleakala	Pan-STARRS 1	·	930 m	MPC · JPL
845204	2017 SV_{177}	—	September 28, 2017	Haleakala	Pan-STARRS 1	H	420 m	MPC · JPL
845205	2017 SX_{183}	—	September 17, 2017	Haleakala	Pan-STARRS 1	·	1.1 km	MPC · JPL
845206	2017 SA_{186}	—	September 30, 2017	Mount Lemmon	Mount Lemmon Survey	·	830 m	MPC · JPL
845207	2017 SC_{187}	—	September 24, 2017	Haleakala	Pan-STARRS 1	BRG	890 m	MPC · JPL
845208	2017 SP_{188}	—	September 28, 2017	Haleakala	Pan-STARRS 1	HNS	820 m	MPC · JPL
845209	2017 SV_{191}	—	September 24, 2017	Haleakala	Pan-STARRS 1	·	890 m	MPC · JPL
845210	2017 SZ_{192}	—	October 10, 2008	Kitt Peak	Spacewatch	·	1.2 km	MPC · JPL
845211	2017 SN_{195}	—	September 22, 2017	Mount Lemmon	Mount Lemmon Survey	·	1.3 km	MPC · JPL
845212	2017 SL_{197}	—	January 21, 2015	Haleakala	Pan-STARRS 1	·	1.2 km	MPC · JPL
845213	2017 SN_{197}	—	September 23, 2017	Haleakala	Pan-STARRS 1	·	1.2 km	MPC · JPL
845214	2017 SQ_{199}	—	September 23, 2017	Haleakala	Pan-STARRS 1	(5)	820 m	MPC · JPL
845215	2017 SW_{199}	—	September 23, 2017	Haleakala	Pan-STARRS 1	·	1.1 km	MPC · JPL
845216	2017 SH_{201}	—	September 24, 2017	Haleakala	Pan-STARRS 1	·	1.3 km	MPC · JPL
845217	2017 SC_{202}	—	September 27, 2017	Haleakala	Pan-STARRS 1	(5)	850 m	MPC · JPL
845218	2017 SK_{202}	—	September 27, 2017	Haleakala	Pan-STARRS 1	·	960 m	MPC · JPL
845219	2017 SQ_{202}	—	September 22, 2017	Haleakala	Pan-STARRS 1	·	840 m	MPC · JPL
845220	2017 SK_{203}	—	September 23, 2017	Haleakala	Pan-STARRS 1	·	890 m	MPC · JPL
845221	2017 SR_{203}	—	September 17, 2017	Haleakala	Pan-STARRS 1	·	1.0 km	MPC · JPL
845222	2017 SS_{204}	—	April 18, 2015	Cerro Tololo	DECam	KOR	860 m	MPC · JPL
845223	2017 SD_{205}	—	September 24, 2017	Haleakala	Pan-STARRS 1	·	1.1 km	MPC · JPL
845224	2017 SG_{205}	—	September 24, 2017	Haleakala	Pan-STARRS 1	·	1.3 km	MPC · JPL
845225	2017 SH_{205}	—	May 21, 2015	Cerro Tololo	DECam	EUN	840 m	MPC · JPL
845226	2017 SL_{209}	—	September 22, 2017	Haleakala	Pan-STARRS 1	(5)	1.1 km	MPC · JPL
845227	2017 SW_{209}	—	September 24, 2017	Haleakala	Pan-STARRS 1	·	1.0 km	MPC · JPL
845228	2017 SL_{210}	—	September 24, 2017	Mount Lemmon	Mount Lemmon Survey	EUN	820 m	MPC · JPL
845229	2017 SB_{211}	—	September 24, 2017	Haleakala	Pan-STARRS 1	·	860 m	MPC · JPL
845230	2017 SQ_{211}	—	September 30, 2017	Haleakala	Pan-STARRS 1	·	980 m	MPC · JPL
845231	2017 SS_{213}	—	September 24, 2017	Mount Lemmon	Mount Lemmon Survey	·	1.1 km	MPC · JPL
845232	2017 SQ_{214}	—	September 22, 2017	Haleakala	Pan-STARRS 1	·	880 m	MPC · JPL
845233	2017 SM_{218}	—	September 30, 2017	Haleakala	Pan-STARRS 1	·	1.9 km	MPC · JPL
845234	2017 SW_{218}	—	September 30, 2017	Mount Lemmon	Mount Lemmon Survey	·	2.5 km	MPC · JPL
845235	2017 SB_{219}	—	September 16, 2017	Haleakala	Pan-STARRS 1	·	1.4 km	MPC · JPL
845236	2017 SP_{220}	—	September 17, 2017	Haleakala	Pan-STARRS 1	·	880 m	MPC · JPL
845237	2017 SK_{222}	—	September 22, 2017	Haleakala	Pan-STARRS 1	·	1.6 km	MPC · JPL
845238	2017 SF_{225}	—	September 18, 2017	Haleakala	Pan-STARRS 1	·	1.4 km	MPC · JPL
845239	2017 SW_{225}	—	September 23, 2017	Haleakala	Pan-STARRS 1	·	1.2 km	MPC · JPL
845240	2017 SY_{226}	—	September 25, 2017	Haleakala	Pan-STARRS 1	·	800 m	MPC · JPL
845241 Zentaalksne	2017 SQ_{228}	Zentaalksne	September 26, 2017	Baldone	K. Černis, I. Eglītis	EUN	790 m	MPC · JPL
845242	2017 SK_{231}	—	September 17, 2017	Haleakala	Pan-STARRS 1	EUN	730 m	MPC · JPL
845243	2017 SX_{235}	—	September 24, 2017	Haleakala	Pan-STARRS 1	·	870 m	MPC · JPL
845244	2017 SJ_{236}	—	September 16, 2017	Haleakala	Pan-STARRS 1	·	1.8 km	MPC · JPL
845245	2017 ST_{236}	—	September 29, 2017	Kitt Peak	Spacewatch	·	2.0 km	MPC · JPL
845246	2017 SG_{237}	—	September 30, 2017	Haleakala	Pan-STARRS 1	·	1.1 km	MPC · JPL
845247	2017 SA_{239}	—	September 26, 2017	Haleakala	Pan-STARRS 1	·	760 m	MPC · JPL
845248	2017 SU_{242}	—	September 22, 2017	Haleakala	Pan-STARRS 1	EOS	1.3 km	MPC · JPL
845249	2017 SW_{246}	—	February 16, 2012	Haleakala	Pan-STARRS 1	V	430 m	MPC · JPL
845250	2017 SF_{248}	—	December 26, 2014	Haleakala	Pan-STARRS 1	·	540 m	MPC · JPL
845251	2017 SL_{248}	—	September 24, 2017	Mount Lemmon	Mount Lemmon Survey	·	940 m	MPC · JPL
845252	2017 SX_{249}	—	September 18, 2017	Haleakala	Pan-STARRS 1	·	1.5 km	MPC · JPL
845253	2017 SJ_{250}	—	April 18, 2015	Cerro Tololo	DECam	·	2.1 km	MPC · JPL
845254	2017 SB_{254}	—	January 22, 2015	Haleakala	Pan-STARRS 1	·	2.2 km	MPC · JPL
845255	2017 SQ_{254}	—	September 29, 2017	Cerro Paranal	Gaia Ground Based Optical Tracking	(5)	900 m	MPC · JPL
845256	2017 SZ_{254}	—	September 17, 2017	Haleakala	Pan-STARRS 1	KOR	960 m	MPC · JPL
845257	2017 SD_{255}	—	September 17, 2017	Haleakala	Pan-STARRS 1	H	370 m	MPC · JPL
845258	2017 SM_{255}	—	September 26, 2017	Haleakala	Pan-STARRS 1	WIT	650 m	MPC · JPL
845259	2017 SR_{255}	—	September 21, 2017	Haleakala	Pan-STARRS 1	·	970 m	MPC · JPL
845260	2017 SV_{255}	—	September 25, 2017	Haleakala	Pan-STARRS 1	·	1.5 km	MPC · JPL
845261	2017 SO_{256}	—	September 17, 2017	Haleakala	Pan-STARRS 1	·	1.6 km	MPC · JPL
845262	2017 SE_{257}	—	March 22, 2015	Mount Lemmon	Mount Lemmon Survey	·	1.4 km	MPC · JPL
845263	2017 ST_{258}	—	April 18, 2015	Cerro Tololo	DECam	·	2.6 km	MPC · JPL
845264	2017 SR_{259}	—	September 24, 2017	Mount Lemmon	Mount Lemmon Survey	·	840 m	MPC · JPL
845265	2017 SK_{260}	—	June 8, 2016	Haleakala	Pan-STARRS 1	·	1.2 km	MPC · JPL
845266	2017 SP_{261}	—	September 21, 2017	ESA OGS	ESA OGS	(5)	1.2 km	MPC · JPL
845267	2017 SB_{263}	—	September 21, 2017	Haleakala	Pan-STARRS 1	JUN	560 m	MPC · JPL
845268	2017 SC_{263}	—	September 21, 2017	Haleakala	Pan-STARRS 1	EUN	700 m	MPC · JPL
845269	2017 SL_{265}	—	March 29, 2016	Cerro Tololo-DECam	DECam	·	900 m	MPC · JPL
845270	2017 SP_{265}	—	September 26, 2017	Haleakala	Pan-STARRS 1	EUN	700 m	MPC · JPL
845271	2017 ST_{265}	—	September 17, 2017	Haleakala	Pan-STARRS 1	·	690 m	MPC · JPL
845272	2017 SX_{265}	—	September 24, 2017	Mount Lemmon	Mount Lemmon Survey	·	740 m	MPC · JPL
845273	2017 SH_{266}	—	January 22, 2015	Haleakala	Pan-STARRS 1	·	1.1 km	MPC · JPL
845274	2017 SS_{266}	—	September 30, 2017	Haleakala	Pan-STARRS 1	·	1.2 km	MPC · JPL
845275	2017 SF_{271}	—	July 5, 2017	Haleakala	Pan-STARRS 1	·	790 m	MPC · JPL
845276	2017 SJ_{271}	—	September 30, 2017	Haleakala	Pan-STARRS 1	ADE	1.1 km	MPC · JPL
845277	2017 SK_{271}	—	September 30, 2017	Mount Lemmon	Mount Lemmon Survey	critical	830 m	MPC · JPL
845278	2017 SJ_{273}	—	September 30, 2017	Haleakala	Pan-STARRS 1	·	1.4 km	MPC · JPL
845279	2017 SY_{273}	—	September 24, 2017	Haleakala	Pan-STARRS 1	·	750 m	MPC · JPL
845280	2017 SB_{275}	—	September 23, 2017	Haleakala	Pan-STARRS 1	AGN	780 m	MPC · JPL
845281	2017 SS_{276}	—	September 27, 2017	Haleakala	Pan-STARRS 1	·	1.0 km	MPC · JPL
845282	2017 SW_{278}	—	September 22, 2017	Haleakala	Pan-STARRS 1	·	950 m	MPC · JPL
845283	2017 SX_{279}	—	September 19, 2017	Haleakala	Pan-STARRS 1	·	810 m	MPC · JPL
845284	2017 SF_{280}	—	September 21, 2017	Haleakala	Pan-STARRS 1	MAR	630 m	MPC · JPL
845285	2017 SS_{280}	—	September 19, 2017	Haleakala	Pan-STARRS 1	·	1.2 km	MPC · JPL
845286	2017 SK_{281}	—	September 24, 2017	Haleakala	Pan-STARRS 1	·	1.1 km	MPC · JPL
845287	2017 SW_{281}	—	September 24, 2017	Haleakala	Pan-STARRS 1	JUN	550 m	MPC · JPL
845288	2017 SO_{282}	—	September 23, 2017	Haleakala	Pan-STARRS 1	·	870 m	MPC · JPL
845289	2017 SL_{283}	—	May 1, 2016	Cerro Tololo	DECam	·	690 m	MPC · JPL
845290	2017 SG_{285}	—	September 26, 2017	Haleakala	Pan-STARRS 1	·	970 m	MPC · JPL
845291	2017 SW_{298}	—	September 21, 2017	Haleakala	Pan-STARRS 1	·	1.3 km	MPC · JPL
845292	2017 SA_{299}	—	March 29, 2016	Cerro Tololo-DECam	DECam	MAR	640 m	MPC · JPL
845293	2017 SC_{299}	—	September 21, 2017	Haleakala	Pan-STARRS 1	ADE	1.2 km	MPC · JPL
845294	2017 SP_{304}	—	September 19, 2017	Haleakala	Pan-STARRS 1	·	1.1 km	MPC · JPL
845295	2017 SH_{316}	—	September 21, 2017	Haleakala	Pan-STARRS 1	·	1.7 km	MPC · JPL
845296	2017 SD_{327}	—	September 23, 2017	Haleakala	Pan-STARRS 1	·	1.8 km	MPC · JPL
845297	2017 SJ_{349}	—	September 30, 2017	Haleakala	Pan-STARRS 1	·	1.4 km	MPC · JPL
845298	2017 SG_{371}	—	May 29, 2003	Cerro Tololo	Deep Ecliptic Survey	·	2.1 km	MPC · JPL
845299	2017 SX_{402}	—	January 20, 2015	Haleakala	Pan-STARRS 1	·	1.2 km	MPC · JPL
845300	2017 TN	—	October 1, 2017	Mount Lemmon	Mount Lemmon Survey	H	470 m	MPC · JPL

== 845301–845400 ==
back to top

Designation			Discovery			Properties		Ref
Permanent	Provisional	Named after	Date	Site	Discoverer(s)	Category	Diam.	Ref
845301	2017 TY	—	December 11, 2013	Haleakala	Pan-STARRS 1	·	1.0 km	MPC · JPL
845302	2017 TZ	—	December 11, 2013	Mount Lemmon	Mount Lemmon Survey	·	960 m	MPC · JPL
845303	2017 TX_{3}	—	September 14, 2017	Haleakala	Pan-STARRS 1	AMO	230 m	MPC · JPL
845304	2017 TY_{7}	—	May 16, 2010	WISE	WISE	·	2.9 km	MPC · JPL
845305	2017 TM_{8}	—	December 18, 2001	Sacramento Peak	SDSS	TIR	2.2 km	MPC · JPL
845306	2017 TA_{9}	—	July 7, 2010	WISE	WISE	·	2.2 km	MPC · JPL
845307	2017 TK_{9}	—	July 11, 2010	WISE	WISE	·	1.6 km	MPC · JPL
845308	2017 TD_{11}	—	September 23, 2017	Haleakala	Pan-STARRS 1	·	2.3 km	MPC · JPL
845309	2017 TK_{17}	—	October 12, 2017	Mount Lemmon	Mount Lemmon Survey	·	990 m	MPC · JPL
845310	2017 TY_{17}	—	February 6, 2010	WISE	WISE	·	1.5 km	MPC · JPL
845311	2017 TC_{21}	—	October 1, 2017	Haleakala	Pan-STARRS 1	·	2.4 km	MPC · JPL
845312	2017 TY_{21}	—	October 14, 2017	Mount Lemmon	Mount Lemmon Survey	·	940 m	MPC · JPL
845313	2017 TF_{24}	—	May 23, 2015	Cerro Tololo	DECam	VER	1.8 km	MPC · JPL
845314	2017 TV_{25}	—	October 15, 2017	Mount Lemmon	Mount Lemmon Survey	(5)	1.1 km	MPC · JPL
845315	2017 TY_{25}	—	October 10, 2017	Mount Lemmon	Mount Lemmon Survey	H	360 m	MPC · JPL
845316	2017 TG_{26}	—	October 15, 2017	Mount Lemmon	Mount Lemmon Survey	·	480 m	MPC · JPL
845317	2017 TK_{26}	—	September 21, 2017	Haleakala	Pan-STARRS 1	V	460 m	MPC · JPL
845318	2017 TV_{26}	—	October 1, 2017	Haleakala	Pan-STARRS 1	·	820 m	MPC · JPL
845319	2017 TG_{27}	—	October 15, 2017	Mount Lemmon	Mount Lemmon Survey	·	2.1 km	MPC · JPL
845320	2017 TE_{28}	—	September 23, 2017	Haleakala	Pan-STARRS 1	PHO	790 m	MPC · JPL
845321	2017 TM_{28}	—	October 15, 2017	Mount Lemmon	Mount Lemmon Survey	·	1.3 km	MPC · JPL
845322	2017 TZ_{28}	—	August 7, 2008	Kitt Peak	Spacewatch	·	1.2 km	MPC · JPL
845323	2017 TC_{29}	—	October 8, 2012	Haleakala	Pan-STARRS 1	·	1.3 km	MPC · JPL
845324	2017 TG_{30}	—	October 15, 2017	Cerro Paranal	Gaia Ground Based Optical Tracking	·	1.1 km	MPC · JPL
845325	2017 TO_{31}	—	September 24, 2017	Haleakala	Pan-STARRS 1	·	1.2 km	MPC · JPL
845326	2017 TD_{32}	—	October 15, 2017	Mount Lemmon	Mount Lemmon Survey	·	790 m	MPC · JPL
845327	2017 TW_{32}	—	April 18, 2015	Cerro Tololo	DECam	EUN	810 m	MPC · JPL
845328	2017 TU_{36}	—	October 12, 2017	Haleakala	Pan-STARRS 1	·	900 m	MPC · JPL
845329	2017 TR_{37}	—	September 1, 2017	Haleakala	Pan-STARRS 1	MAR	770 m	MPC · JPL
845330	2017 TF_{38}	—	October 5, 2013	Haleakala	Pan-STARRS 1	·	800 m	MPC · JPL
845331	2017 TW_{38}	—	October 15, 2017	Mount Lemmon	Mount Lemmon Survey	KON	1.5 km	MPC · JPL
845332	2017 TM_{40}	—	September 30, 2017	Mount Lemmon	Mount Lemmon Survey	EUN	870 m	MPC · JPL
845333	2017 TP_{41}	—	October 13, 2017	Mount Lemmon	Mount Lemmon Survey	·	1.2 km	MPC · JPL
845334	2017 TU_{41}	—	October 12, 2017	Mount Lemmon	Mount Lemmon Survey	·	1.2 km	MPC · JPL
845335	2017 TE_{42}	—	October 12, 2017	Haleakala	Pan-STARRS 1	EUN	730 m	MPC · JPL
845336	2017 TJ_{44}	—	October 15, 2017	Mount Lemmon	Mount Lemmon Survey	·	960 m	MPC · JPL
845337	2017 TX_{44}	—	October 15, 2017	Mount Lemmon	Mount Lemmon Survey	·	650 m	MPC · JPL
845338	2017 TJ_{50}	—	October 15, 2017	Mount Lemmon	Mount Lemmon Survey	·	1.5 km	MPC · JPL
845339	2017 UE_{10}	—	July 30, 2017	Haleakala	Pan-STARRS 1	(1547)	1.4 km	MPC · JPL
845340	2017 UR_{12}	—	January 13, 2010	WISE	WISE	·	1.2 km	MPC · JPL
845341	2017 UB_{14}	—	October 5, 2013	Haleakala	Pan-STARRS 1	·	670 m	MPC · JPL
845342	2017 UX_{16}	—	September 6, 2008	Mount Lemmon	Mount Lemmon Survey	·	1.2 km	MPC · JPL
845343	2017 UH_{17}	—	August 18, 2009	Kitt Peak	Spacewatch	T_{j} (2.95) · 3:2	3.5 km	MPC · JPL
845344	2017 UH_{18}	—	March 30, 2016	Haleakala	Pan-STARRS 1	H	430 m	MPC · JPL
845345	2017 UM_{20}	—	September 19, 2000	Kitt Peak	Deep Ecliptic Survey	·	1.0 km	MPC · JPL
845346	2017 UL_{22}	—	August 31, 2017	Haleakala	Pan-STARRS 1	·	1.4 km	MPC · JPL
845347	2017 UP_{22}	—	November 11, 2001	Sacramento Peak	SDSS	EOS	1.5 km	MPC · JPL
845348	2017 UC_{25}	—	November 17, 2009	Mount Lemmon	Mount Lemmon Survey	(5)	730 m	MPC · JPL
845349	2017 US_{30}	—	January 24, 2015	Haleakala	Pan-STARRS 1	·	520 m	MPC · JPL
845350	2017 US_{32}	—	September 1, 2013	Oukaïmeden	C. Rinner	·	820 m	MPC · JPL
845351	2017 UG_{33}	—	November 16, 2009	Kitt Peak	Spacewatch	(5)	550 m	MPC · JPL
845352	2017 UM_{34}	—	January 7, 2010	Mount Lemmon	Mount Lemmon Survey	·	820 m	MPC · JPL
845353	2017 UB_{35}	—	March 22, 2015	Mount Lemmon	Mount Lemmon Survey	·	910 m	MPC · JPL
845354	2017 UD_{35}	—	October 26, 2013	Mount Lemmon	Mount Lemmon Survey	BRG	1.0 km	MPC · JPL
845355	2017 UG_{36}	—	October 29, 2002	Sacramento Peak	SDSS	·	2.1 km	MPC · JPL
845356	2017 UJ_{36}	—	December 31, 2013	SATINO Remote	J. Jahn	·	820 m	MPC · JPL
845357	2017 UB_{37}	—	April 8, 2002	Kitt Peak	Spacewatch	·	1.3 km	MPC · JPL
845358	2017 UH_{37}	—	December 18, 2001	Sacramento Peak	SDSS	·	1.3 km	MPC · JPL
845359	2017 UL_{37}	—	May 3, 2016	Cerro Tololo	DECam	(1547)	870 m	MPC · JPL
845360	2017 UX_{38}	—	November 11, 2013	Kitt Peak	Spacewatch	·	800 m	MPC · JPL
845361	2017 UF_{41}	—	October 27, 2017	Mount Lemmon	Mount Lemmon Survey	·	880 m	MPC · JPL
845362	2017 UP_{41}	—	November 20, 2014	Mount Lemmon	Mount Lemmon Survey	·	470 m	MPC · JPL
845363	2017 UR_{41}	—	June 2, 2010	WISE	WISE	·	1.9 km	MPC · JPL
845364	2017 UE_{42}	—	October 8, 2008	Mount Lemmon	Mount Lemmon Survey	·	1.3 km	MPC · JPL
845365	2017 UF_{46}	—	October 28, 2017	Haleakala	Pan-STARRS 1	PAD	1.1 km	MPC · JPL
845366	2017 UE_{50}	—	April 18, 2015	Cerro Tololo	DECam	·	1.1 km	MPC · JPL
845367	2017 UP_{52}	—	December 31, 2013	Haleakala	Pan-STARRS 1	·	830 m	MPC · JPL
845368	2017 UF_{53}	—	October 30, 2017	Haleakala	Pan-STARRS 1	WAT	1.1 km	MPC · JPL
845369	2017 UU_{53}	—	October 11, 2004	Kitt Peak	Spacewatch	·	1.1 km	MPC · JPL
845370	2017 UY_{53}	—	April 18, 2015	Cerro Tololo	DECam	EUN	970 m	MPC · JPL
845371	2017 UB_{54}	—	April 21, 2015	Cerro Tololo	DECam	EUN	810 m	MPC · JPL
845372	2017 UP_{55}	—	October 16, 2017	Mount Lemmon	Mount Lemmon Survey	EUN	830 m	MPC · JPL
845373	2017 UQ_{58}	—	October 18, 2017	Haleakala	Pan-STARRS 1	·	1.0 km	MPC · JPL
845374	2017 UQ_{59}	—	October 30, 2017	Haleakala	Pan-STARRS 1	·	1.2 km	MPC · JPL
845375	2017 UE_{62}	—	October 21, 2017	Mount Lemmon	Mount Lemmon Survey	·	880 m	MPC · JPL
845376	2017 UK_{66}	—	October 30, 2017	Haleakala	Pan-STARRS 1	(5)	990 m	MPC · JPL
845377	2017 UC_{67}	—	October 28, 2017	Mount Lemmon	Mount Lemmon Survey	MAR	790 m	MPC · JPL
845378	2017 UN_{67}	—	October 30, 2017	Haleakala	Pan-STARRS 1	ADE	1.0 km	MPC · JPL
845379	2017 US_{68}	—	October 17, 2017	Mount Lemmon	Mount Lemmon Survey	·	770 m	MPC · JPL
845380	2017 UM_{73}	—	December 2, 2010	Mount Lemmon	Mount Lemmon Survey	NYS	690 m	MPC · JPL
845381	2017 UO_{74}	—	October 21, 2017	Mount Lemmon	Mount Lemmon Survey	·	600 m	MPC · JPL
845382	2017 UK_{75}	—	October 17, 2017	Mount Lemmon	Mount Lemmon Survey	·	910 m	MPC · JPL
845383	2017 UC_{77}	—	October 22, 2017	Mount Lemmon	Mount Lemmon Survey	·	1.4 km	MPC · JPL
845384	2017 UZ_{81}	—	May 20, 2015	Cerro Tololo	DECam	·	2.1 km	MPC · JPL
845385	2017 UL_{82}	—	October 30, 2017	Haleakala	Pan-STARRS 1	·	1.0 km	MPC · JPL
845386	2017 UX_{83}	—	October 30, 2017	Haleakala	Pan-STARRS 1	·	740 m	MPC · JPL
845387	2017 UQ_{84}	—	October 28, 2017	Mount Lemmon	Mount Lemmon Survey	·	1.1 km	MPC · JPL
845388	2017 UE_{85}	—	October 15, 2017	Mount Lemmon	Mount Lemmon Survey	·	1.1 km	MPC · JPL
845389	2017 UU_{85}	—	October 27, 2017	Haleakala	Pan-STARRS 1	·	990 m	MPC · JPL
845390	2017 UO_{87}	—	April 18, 2015	Cerro Tololo	DECam	·	1.2 km	MPC · JPL
845391	2017 US_{87}	—	May 20, 2015	Cerro Tololo	DECam	·	940 m	MPC · JPL
845392	2017 UE_{88}	—	April 19, 2015	Cerro Tololo	DECam	MAR	760 m	MPC · JPL
845393	2017 UC_{90}	—	October 19, 2017	Haleakala	Pan-STARRS 1	·	1.2 km	MPC · JPL
845394	2017 UF_{91}	—	October 30, 2017	Haleakala	Pan-STARRS 1	·	970 m	MPC · JPL
845395	2017 UW_{94}	—	March 23, 2015	Kitt Peak	L. H. Wasserman, M. W. Buie	AGN	700 m	MPC · JPL
845396	2017 UK_{95}	—	October 22, 2017	Mount Lemmon	Mount Lemmon Survey	·	990 m	MPC · JPL
845397	2017 UZ_{95}	—	October 21, 2017	Mount Lemmon	Mount Lemmon Survey	·	1.4 km	MPC · JPL
845398	2017 UP_{97}	—	October 28, 2017	Mount Lemmon	Mount Lemmon Survey	EUN	800 m	MPC · JPL
845399	2017 UB_{98}	—	October 18, 2017	Mount Lemmon	Mount Lemmon Survey	·	1.2 km	MPC · JPL
845400	2017 UX_{98}	—	October 29, 2017	Mount Lemmon	Mount Lemmon Survey	·	1.0 km	MPC · JPL

== 845401–845500 ==
back to top

Designation			Discovery			Properties		Ref
Permanent	Provisional	Named after	Date	Site	Discoverer(s)	Category	Diam.	Ref
845401	2017 UD_{99}	—	October 30, 2017	Haleakala	Pan-STARRS 1	MIS	1.6 km	MPC · JPL
845402	2017 US_{100}	—	October 28, 2017	Haleakala	Pan-STARRS 1	·	1.1 km	MPC · JPL
845403	2017 UB_{101}	—	October 29, 2017	Haleakala	Pan-STARRS 1	·	1.7 km	MPC · JPL
845404	2017 UV_{101}	—	October 27, 2017	Haleakala	Pan-STARRS 1	·	730 m	MPC · JPL
845405	2017 UY_{101}	—	October 27, 2017	Mount Lemmon	Mount Lemmon Survey	KON	1.9 km	MPC · JPL
845406	2017 UJ_{102}	—	October 29, 2017	Haleakala	Pan-STARRS 1	·	450 m	MPC · JPL
845407	2017 UN_{102}	—	October 22, 2017	Mount Lemmon	Mount Lemmon Survey	·	900 m	MPC · JPL
845408	2017 UQ_{103}	—	October 28, 2017	Haleakala	Pan-STARRS 1	·	1.2 km	MPC · JPL
845409	2017 UC_{105}	—	October 23, 2017	Mount Lemmon	Mount Lemmon Survey	(5)	860 m	MPC · JPL
845410	2017 UF_{106}	—	October 28, 2017	Haleakala	Pan-STARRS 1	NEM	1.6 km	MPC · JPL
845411	2017 UH_{106}	—	October 30, 2017	Haleakala	Pan-STARRS 1	·	1.2 km	MPC · JPL
845412	2017 UW_{107}	—	October 18, 2017	Haleakala	Pan-STARRS 1	·	1.1 km	MPC · JPL
845413	2017 UR_{108}	—	October 28, 2017	Haleakala	Pan-STARRS 1	·	1.3 km	MPC · JPL
845414	2017 UL_{110}	—	October 21, 2017	Mount Lemmon	Mount Lemmon Survey	·	660 m	MPC · JPL
845415	2017 UV_{111}	—	October 8, 2008	Mount Lemmon	Mount Lemmon Survey	·	1.0 km	MPC · JPL
845416	2017 UQ_{112}	—	October 21, 2017	Mount Lemmon	Mount Lemmon Survey	·	490 m	MPC · JPL
845417	2017 UV_{113}	—	October 29, 2017	Mount Lemmon	Mount Lemmon Survey	·	1.3 km	MPC · JPL
845418	2017 UQ_{114}	—	October 18, 2017	Haleakala	Pan-STARRS 1	WIT	610 m	MPC · JPL
845419	2017 UT_{114}	—	October 20, 2017	Mount Lemmon	Mount Lemmon Survey	·	1.1 km	MPC · JPL
845420	2017 UV_{117}	—	October 27, 2017	Haleakala	Pan-STARRS 1	·	1.4 km	MPC · JPL
845421	2017 UD_{118}	—	October 21, 2017	Mount Lemmon	Mount Lemmon Survey	·	1.3 km	MPC · JPL
845422	2017 UX_{119}	—	September 3, 2008	Kitt Peak	Spacewatch	·	1.1 km	MPC · JPL
845423	2017 UM_{120}	—	October 23, 2017	Mount Lemmon	Mount Lemmon Survey	·	1.3 km	MPC · JPL
845424	2017 UL_{123}	—	May 1, 2016	Cerro Tololo	DECam	·	930 m	MPC · JPL
845425	2017 UO_{123}	—	October 30, 2017	Haleakala	Pan-STARRS 1	MAR	680 m	MPC · JPL
845426	2017 UT_{123}	—	October 23, 2017	Mount Lemmon	Mount Lemmon Survey	ERI	1.0 km	MPC · JPL
845427	2017 UD_{124}	—	October 22, 2017	Mount Lemmon	Mount Lemmon Survey	·	1.2 km	MPC · JPL
845428	2017 UQ_{124}	—	October 22, 2017	Mount Lemmon	Mount Lemmon Survey	·	540 m	MPC · JPL
845429	2017 UT_{125}	—	October 21, 2017	Mount Lemmon	Mount Lemmon Survey	EOS	1.2 km	MPC · JPL
845430	2017 UZ_{130}	—	October 21, 2017	Mount Lemmon	Mount Lemmon Survey	·	800 m	MPC · JPL
845431	2017 UF_{132}	—	May 21, 2015	Cerro Tololo	DECam	·	1.1 km	MPC · JPL
845432	2017 UR_{135}	—	April 18, 2015	Cerro Tololo	DECam	·	800 m	MPC · JPL
845433	2017 UX_{140}	—	October 18, 2017	Mount Lemmon	Mount Lemmon Survey	·	1.2 km	MPC · JPL
845434	2017 UZ_{142}	—	October 22, 2017	Mount Lemmon	Mount Lemmon Survey	·	1.4 km	MPC · JPL
845435	2017 UH_{144}	—	August 7, 2008	La Sagra	OAM	·	1.3 km	MPC · JPL
845436	2017 UL_{144}	—	October 22, 2017	Mount Lemmon	Mount Lemmon Survey	·	1.2 km	MPC · JPL
845437	2017 UU_{145}	—	April 18, 2015	Cerro Tololo	DECam	KOR	890 m	MPC · JPL
845438	2017 UV_{145}	—	October 17, 2017	Mount Lemmon	Mount Lemmon Survey	EUN	770 m	MPC · JPL
845439	2017 UB_{149}	—	October 28, 2017	Haleakala	Pan-STARRS 1	·	750 m	MPC · JPL
845440	2017 UL_{151}	—	October 28, 2017	Haleakala	Pan-STARRS 1	·	1.3 km	MPC · JPL
845441	2017 UO_{155}	—	October 28, 2017	Mount Lemmon	Mount Lemmon Survey	EUN	610 m	MPC · JPL
845442	2017 UE_{156}	—	October 23, 2017	Mount Lemmon	Mount Lemmon Survey	·	750 m	MPC · JPL
845443	2017 UF_{156}	—	October 27, 2017	Haleakala	Pan-STARRS 1	·	910 m	MPC · JPL
845444	2017 UB_{157}	—	October 19, 2017	Mount Lemmon	Mount Lemmon Survey	·	860 m	MPC · JPL
845445	2017 UG_{158}	—	October 29, 2017	Mount Lemmon	Mount Lemmon Survey	·	1.3 km	MPC · JPL
845446	2017 UM_{158}	—	October 30, 2017	Haleakala	Pan-STARRS 1	·	940 m	MPC · JPL
845447	2017 UF_{159}	—	October 29, 2017	Haleakala	Pan-STARRS 1	(5)	650 m	MPC · JPL
845448	2017 UL_{159}	—	October 17, 2017	Mount Lemmon	Mount Lemmon Survey	·	900 m	MPC · JPL
845449	2017 UR_{159}	—	April 18, 2015	Cerro Tololo	DECam	WIT	630 m	MPC · JPL
845450	2017 UB_{161}	—	October 30, 2017	Haleakala	Pan-STARRS 1	·	840 m	MPC · JPL
845451	2017 UG_{162}	—	October 30, 2017	Haleakala	Pan-STARRS 1	·	980 m	MPC · JPL
845452	2017 UM_{162}	—	October 28, 2017	Haleakala	Pan-STARRS 1	·	870 m	MPC · JPL
845453	2017 UP_{162}	—	October 7, 2008	Mount Lemmon	Mount Lemmon Survey	·	1.0 km	MPC · JPL
845454	2017 UO_{163}	—	October 27, 2017	Haleakala	Pan-STARRS 1	·	1.1 km	MPC · JPL
845455	2017 UR_{163}	—	April 18, 2015	Cerro Tololo	DECam	·	950 m	MPC · JPL
845456	2017 UU_{164}	—	April 18, 2015	Cerro Tololo	DECam	·	1.1 km	MPC · JPL
845457	2017 UM_{165}	—	October 28, 2017	Haleakala	Pan-STARRS 1	·	1.1 km	MPC · JPL
845458	2017 UY_{166}	—	October 28, 2017	Mount Lemmon	Mount Lemmon Survey	·	860 m	MPC · JPL
845459	2017 UL_{167}	—	October 30, 2017	Haleakala	Pan-STARRS 1	·	1.1 km	MPC · JPL
845460	2017 UX_{177}	—	April 18, 2015	Cerro Tololo	DECam	·	1.0 km	MPC · JPL
845461	2017 UW_{178}	—	October 29, 2017	Haleakala	Pan-STARRS 1	·	910 m	MPC · JPL
845462	2017 UA_{179}	—	October 30, 2017	Haleakala	Pan-STARRS 1	·	1.1 km	MPC · JPL
845463	2017 UF_{180}	—	April 19, 2015	Cerro Tololo	DECam	·	1.1 km	MPC · JPL
845464	2017 UW_{181}	—	October 28, 2017	Mount Lemmon	Mount Lemmon Survey	·	1.3 km	MPC · JPL
845465	2017 UO_{183}	—	September 28, 2017	Haleakala	Pan-STARRS 1	·	940 m	MPC · JPL
845466	2017 UR_{183}	—	October 27, 2017	Haleakala	Pan-STARRS 1	·	1.2 km	MPC · JPL
845467	2017 US_{215}	—	April 5, 2010	Mount Lemmon	Mount Lemmon Survey	·	1.3 km	MPC · JPL
845468	2017 VG_{4}	—	January 27, 2015	Haleakala	Pan-STARRS 1	·	1.0 km	MPC · JPL
845469	2017 VR_{4}	—	September 24, 2017	Mount Lemmon	Mount Lemmon Survey	(1547)	1.3 km	MPC · JPL
845470	2017 VC_{5}	—	September 29, 2013	Mount Lemmon	Mount Lemmon Survey	(5)	920 m	MPC · JPL
845471	2017 VD_{6}	—	December 2, 2010	Mayhill-ISON	L. Elenin	·	460 m	MPC · JPL
845472	2017 VC_{8}	—	November 13, 2012	Mount Lemmon	Mount Lemmon Survey	·	1.6 km	MPC · JPL
845473	2017 VH_{10}	—	December 6, 2013	Haleakala	Pan-STARRS 1	·	980 m	MPC · JPL
845474	2017 VF_{11}	—	September 15, 2007	Mount Lemmon	Mount Lemmon Survey	·	720 m	MPC · JPL
845475	2017 VQ_{12}	—	December 16, 1995	Kitt Peak	Spacewatch	H	330 m	MPC · JPL
845476	2017 VQ_{15}	—	November 3, 2007	Kitt Peak	Spacewatch	·	1.2 km	MPC · JPL
845477	2017 VN_{16}	—	November 13, 2017	Haleakala	Pan-STARRS 1	·	1.3 km	MPC · JPL
845478	2017 VV_{17}	—	September 3, 2017	Mount Lemmon	Mount Lemmon Survey	·	800 m	MPC · JPL
845479	2017 VM_{20}	—	October 7, 2013	Mount Lemmon	Mount Lemmon Survey	(5)	690 m	MPC · JPL
845480	2017 VA_{21}	—	May 10, 2010	WISE	WISE	·	1.5 km	MPC · JPL
845481	2017 VT_{21}	—	March 15, 2010	WISE	WISE	·	1.5 km	MPC · JPL
845482	2017 VA_{22}	—	December 20, 2009	Mount Lemmon	Mount Lemmon Survey	·	1 km	MPC · JPL
845483	2017 VP_{25}	—	January 6, 2010	Mount Lemmon	Mount Lemmon Survey	·	1.2 km	MPC · JPL
845484	2017 VV_{28}	—	October 22, 2017	Mount Lemmon	Mount Lemmon Survey	·	1.4 km	MPC · JPL
845485	2017 VP_{31}	—	July 30, 2017	Haleakala	Pan-STARRS 1	·	860 m	MPC · JPL
845486	2017 VX_{32}	—	September 22, 2017	Haleakala	Pan-STARRS 1	·	1.3 km	MPC · JPL
845487	2017 VW_{36}	—	June 22, 2011	Nogales	M. Schwartz, P. R. Holvorcem	·	1.8 km	MPC · JPL
845488	2017 VF_{38}	—	January 31, 2015	Haleakala	Pan-STARRS 1	·	1.1 km	MPC · JPL
845489	2017 VU_{41}	—	November 14, 2017	Mount Lemmon	Mount Lemmon Survey	·	2.1 km	MPC · JPL
845490	2017 VV_{41}	—	May 1, 2016	Cerro Tololo	DECam	·	810 m	MPC · JPL
845491	2017 VD_{42}	—	November 13, 2017	Haleakala	Pan-STARRS 1	·	750 m	MPC · JPL
845492	2017 VG_{42}	—	November 15, 2017	Mount Lemmon	Mount Lemmon Survey	·	940 m	MPC · JPL
845493	2017 VF_{43}	—	November 15, 2017	Mount Lemmon	Mount Lemmon Survey	(5)	990 m	MPC · JPL
845494	2017 VF_{46}	—	November 14, 2017	Mount Lemmon	Mount Lemmon Survey	·	480 m	MPC · JPL
845495	2017 VP_{48}	—	November 14, 2017	Mount Lemmon	Mount Lemmon Survey	·	730 m	MPC · JPL
845496	2017 VA_{50}	—	April 18, 2015	Cerro Tololo	DECam	·	1.5 km	MPC · JPL
845497	2017 VE_{53}	—	November 13, 2017	Haleakala	Pan-STARRS 1	·	1.2 km	MPC · JPL
845498	2017 VH_{54}	—	September 13, 2004	Kitt Peak	Spacewatch	·	990 m	MPC · JPL
845499	2017 VF_{55}	—	November 14, 2017	Mount Lemmon	Mount Lemmon Survey	·	1.1 km	MPC · JPL
845500	2017 VS_{55}	—	November 15, 2017	Mount Lemmon	Mount Lemmon Survey	·	1.0 km	MPC · JPL

== 845501–845600 ==
back to top

Designation			Discovery			Properties		Ref
Permanent	Provisional	Named after	Date	Site	Discoverer(s)	Category	Diam.	Ref
845501	2017 VN_{56}	—	November 14, 2017	Mount Lemmon	Mount Lemmon Survey	·	1.2 km	MPC · JPL
845502	2017 VT_{56}	—	April 18, 2015	Cerro Tololo	DECam	·	980 m	MPC · JPL
845503	2017 VH_{60}	—	November 10, 2017	Haleakala	Pan-STARRS 1	V	330 m	MPC · JPL
845504	2017 VR_{60}	—	March 3, 2006	Kitt Peak	Spacewatch	·	930 m	MPC · JPL
845505	2017 WO_{3}	—	September 29, 2008	Mount Lemmon	Mount Lemmon Survey	JUN	810 m	MPC · JPL
845506	2017 WF_{8}	—	November 18, 2017	Haleakala	Pan-STARRS 1	EUN	840 m	MPC · JPL
845507	2017 WR_{10}	—	August 3, 2017	Haleakala	Pan-STARRS 1	·	810 m	MPC · JPL
845508	2017 WA_{11}	—	November 8, 2007	Kitt Peak	Spacewatch	·	450 m	MPC · JPL
845509	2017 WP_{17}	—	October 28, 2017	Mount Lemmon	Mount Lemmon Survey	·	1.5 km	MPC · JPL
845510	2017 WX_{17}	—	March 17, 2015	Haleakala	Pan-STARRS 1	EUN	920 m	MPC · JPL
845511	2017 WA_{19}	—	September 17, 2012	Kitt Peak	Spacewatch	·	1.3 km	MPC · JPL
845512	2017 WB_{19}	—	April 8, 2010	WISE	WISE	·	3.3 km	MPC · JPL
845513	2017 WF_{19}	—	May 1, 2016	Cerro Tololo	DECam	·	600 m	MPC · JPL
845514	2017 WG_{19}	—	March 21, 1999	Sacramento Peak	SDSS	·	1.2 km	MPC · JPL
845515	2017 WR_{19}	—	November 25, 2006	Mount Lemmon	Mount Lemmon Survey	·	760 m	MPC · JPL
845516	2017 WV_{19}	—	April 13, 2010	WISE	WISE	(7605)	3.8 km	MPC · JPL
845517	2017 WB_{23}	—	September 23, 2008	Mount Lemmon	Mount Lemmon Survey	·	1.0 km	MPC · JPL
845518	2017 WE_{24}	—	September 13, 2017	Haleakala	Pan-STARRS 1	H	490 m	MPC · JPL
845519	2017 WB_{25}	—	January 9, 2014	Haleakala	Pan-STARRS 1	(1547)	1.2 km	MPC · JPL
845520	2017 WC_{25}	—	September 15, 2004	Siding Spring	SSS	·	1.1 km	MPC · JPL
845521	2017 WC_{26}	—	October 18, 2017	Haleakala	Pan-STARRS 1	·	1.1 km	MPC · JPL
845522	2017 WS_{26}	—	September 19, 2017	Haleakala	Pan-STARRS 1	·	1.0 km	MPC · JPL
845523	2017 WK_{29}	—	November 21, 2017	Mount Lemmon	Mount Lemmon Survey	PHO	770 m	MPC · JPL
845524	2017 WA_{30}	—	January 3, 2014	Mount Lemmon	Mount Lemmon Survey	·	1.2 km	MPC · JPL
845525	2017 WD_{30}	—	September 2, 2008	La Sagra	OAM	·	1.0 km	MPC · JPL
845526	2017 WP_{30}	—	November 21, 2017	Haleakala	Pan-STARRS 1	GEF	940 m	MPC · JPL
845527	2017 WW_{32}	—	November 16, 2017	Mount Lemmon	Mount Lemmon Survey	·	770 m	MPC · JPL
845528	2017 WD_{33}	—	May 20, 2015	Cerro Tololo	DECam	(1547)	1.1 km	MPC · JPL
845529	2017 WM_{33}	—	November 26, 2017	Mount Lemmon	Mount Lemmon Survey	·	1.3 km	MPC · JPL
845530	2017 WX_{33}	—	November 21, 2017	Haleakala	Pan-STARRS 1	·	1.4 km	MPC · JPL
845531	2017 WF_{37}	—	September 5, 2000	Sacramento Peak	SDSS	·	630 m	MPC · JPL
845532	2017 WA_{41}	—	November 22, 2017	Haleakala	Pan-STARRS 1	PHO	930 m	MPC · JPL
845533	2017 WB_{43}	—	November 18, 2017	Haleakala	Pan-STARRS 1	·	2.0 km	MPC · JPL
845534	2017 WY_{43}	—	November 19, 2017	Mount Lemmon	Mount Lemmon Survey	T_{j} (2.94)	4.2 km	MPC · JPL
845535	2017 WD_{44}	—	November 16, 2017	Mount Lemmon	Mount Lemmon Survey	·	1.2 km	MPC · JPL
845536	2017 WL_{45}	—	November 21, 2017	Haleakala	Pan-STARRS 1	·	1.1 km	MPC · JPL
845537	2017 WA_{48}	—	November 16, 2017	Mount Lemmon	Mount Lemmon Survey	BRG	1.1 km	MPC · JPL
845538	2017 WZ_{48}	—	December 24, 2013	Mount Lemmon	Mount Lemmon Survey	·	1.3 km	MPC · JPL
845539	2017 WE_{49}	—	November 27, 2017	Mount Lemmon	Mount Lemmon Survey	·	460 m	MPC · JPL
845540	2017 WF_{51}	—	November 16, 2017	Mount Lemmon	Mount Lemmon Survey	·	1.5 km	MPC · JPL
845541	2017 WP_{52}	—	November 21, 2017	Haleakala	Pan-STARRS 1	·	1.2 km	MPC · JPL
845542	2017 WD_{53}	—	November 21, 2017	Haleakala	Pan-STARRS 1	·	1.2 km	MPC · JPL
845543	2017 WD_{54}	—	November 16, 2017	Mount Lemmon	Mount Lemmon Survey	·	1.0 km	MPC · JPL
845544	2017 WU_{59}	—	May 21, 2015	Haleakala	Pan-STARRS 1	·	1.3 km	MPC · JPL
845545	2017 WE_{62}	—	May 1, 2016	Haleakala	Pan-STARRS 1	H	350 m	MPC · JPL
845546	2017 WK_{62}	—	November 21, 2017	Haleakala	Pan-STARRS 1	WIT	610 m	MPC · JPL
845547	2017 WX_{64}	—	October 15, 2017	Mount Lemmon	Mount Lemmon Survey	·	790 m	MPC · JPL
845548	2017 WK_{66}	—	November 22, 2017	Haleakala	Pan-STARRS 1	(194)	880 m	MPC · JPL
845549	2017 WB_{68}	—	April 18, 2015	Cerro Tololo	DECam	·	1.1 km	MPC · JPL
845550	2017 WY_{68}	—	November 21, 2017	Haleakala	Pan-STARRS 1	·	1.2 km	MPC · JPL
845551	2017 WK_{69}	—	November 16, 2017	Mount Lemmon	Mount Lemmon Survey	MAR	640 m	MPC · JPL
845552	2017 WS_{69}	—	November 26, 2017	Mount Lemmon	Mount Lemmon Survey	·	1.1 km	MPC · JPL
845553	2017 WF_{70}	—	November 24, 2017	Haleakala	Pan-STARRS 1	EUN	770 m	MPC · JPL
845554	2017 WM_{72}	—	November 21, 2017	Mount Lemmon	Mount Lemmon Survey	(5)	880 m	MPC · JPL
845555	2017 WF_{73}	—	November 17, 2017	Haleakala	Pan-STARRS 1	·	660 m	MPC · JPL
845556	2017 WB_{74}	—	November 16, 2017	Mount Lemmon	Mount Lemmon Survey	EUN	810 m	MPC · JPL
845557	2017 WO_{74}	—	November 16, 2017	Mount Lemmon	Mount Lemmon Survey	·	1.1 km	MPC · JPL
845558	2017 WF_{75}	—	April 18, 2015	Cerro Tololo	DECam	KON	1.5 km	MPC · JPL
845559	2017 WZ_{83}	—	October 29, 2008	Mount Lemmon	Mount Lemmon Survey	·	1.3 km	MPC · JPL
845560	2017 WE_{90}	—	November 21, 2017	Haleakala	Pan-STARRS 1	·	2.7 km	MPC · JPL
845561	2017 WD_{99}	—	November 18, 2017	Haleakala	Pan-STARRS 1	·	1.1 km	MPC · JPL
845562	2017 WB_{105}	—	November 17, 2017	Haleakala	Pan-STARRS 1	·	1.2 km	MPC · JPL
845563	2017 XK_{3}	—	November 29, 2000	Socorro	LINEAR	·	1.5 km	MPC · JPL
845564	2017 XX_{6}	—	October 29, 2017	Haleakala	Pan-STARRS 1	(5)	880 m	MPC · JPL
845565	2017 XM_{7}	—	April 18, 2015	Cerro Tololo	DECam	·	1.1 km	MPC · JPL
845566	2017 XB_{9}	—	September 7, 2004	Kitt Peak	Spacewatch	·	800 m	MPC · JPL
845567	2017 XE_{9}	—	April 24, 2014	Cerro Tololo	DECam	·	1.6 km	MPC · JPL
845568	2017 XF_{12}	—	November 8, 2008	Kitt Peak	Spacewatch	·	1.2 km	MPC · JPL
845569	2017 XQ_{22}	—	January 14, 2011	Mount Lemmon	Mount Lemmon Survey	·	710 m	MPC · JPL
845570	2017 XS_{22}	—	November 8, 2013	Mount Lemmon	Mount Lemmon Survey	·	740 m	MPC · JPL
845571	2017 XC_{33}	—	February 19, 2015	Haleakala	Pan-STARRS 1	·	1.2 km	MPC · JPL
845572	2017 XD_{33}	—	October 30, 2017	Haleakala	Pan-STARRS 1	·	700 m	MPC · JPL
845573	2017 XS_{34}	—	October 30, 2017	Haleakala	Pan-STARRS 1	·	1.5 km	MPC · JPL
845574	2017 XC_{35}	—	June 9, 2010	WISE	WISE	EUP	3.9 km	MPC · JPL
845575	2017 XC_{37}	—	October 3, 2013	Mount Lemmon	Mount Lemmon Survey	MAS	560 m	MPC · JPL
845576	2017 XQ_{38}	—	September 22, 2003	Palomar	NEAT	DOR	1.5 km	MPC · JPL
845577	2017 XZ_{39}	—	January 24, 2014	Haleakala	Pan-STARRS 1	·	1.1 km	MPC · JPL
845578	2017 XR_{41}	—	October 22, 2017	Mount Lemmon	Mount Lemmon Survey	·	1.3 km	MPC · JPL
845579	2017 XD_{42}	—	November 17, 2008	Kitt Peak	Spacewatch	NEM	1.5 km	MPC · JPL
845580	2017 XG_{42}	—	November 1, 2013	Mount Lemmon	Mount Lemmon Survey	MAS	550 m	MPC · JPL
845581	2017 XW_{43}	—	November 21, 2017	Haleakala	Pan-STARRS 1	·	910 m	MPC · JPL
845582	2017 XF_{47}	—	October 5, 2002	Sacramento Peak	SDSS	KOR	970 m	MPC · JPL
845583	2017 XV_{47}	—	April 25, 2015	Haleakala	Pan-STARRS 1	·	1.2 km	MPC · JPL
845584	2017 XE_{49}	—	April 25, 2015	Haleakala	Pan-STARRS 1	KOR	1.1 km	MPC · JPL
845585	2017 XT_{49}	—	December 10, 2010	Mount Lemmon	Mount Lemmon Survey	ERI	750 m	MPC · JPL
845586	2017 XV_{50}	—	June 27, 2010	WISE	WISE	·	3.1 km	MPC · JPL
845587	2017 XM_{52}	—	November 7, 2008	Mount Lemmon	Mount Lemmon Survey	·	1.2 km	MPC · JPL
845588	2017 XW_{52}	—	October 9, 2012	Mount Lemmon	Mount Lemmon Survey	AGN	930 m	MPC · JPL
845589	2017 XS_{54}	—	September 7, 2004	Kitt Peak	Spacewatch	·	890 m	MPC · JPL
845590	2017 XT_{54}	—	October 30, 2017	Haleakala	Pan-STARRS 1	·	1.3 km	MPC · JPL
845591	2017 XC_{56}	—	November 27, 2013	Haleakala	Pan-STARRS 1	·	830 m	MPC · JPL
845592	2017 XD_{57}	—	November 15, 2017	Mount Lemmon	Mount Lemmon Survey	·	1.2 km	MPC · JPL
845593	2017 XT_{57}	—	February 20, 2014	Haleakala	Pan-STARRS 1	·	1.5 km	MPC · JPL
845594	2017 XU_{59}	—	December 12, 2017	Haleakala	Pan-STARRS 1	AGN	890 m	MPC · JPL
845595	2017 XZ_{63}	—	February 10, 2010	WISE	WISE	PHO	630 m	MPC · JPL
845596	2017 XJ_{71}	—	December 14, 2017	Mount Lemmon	Mount Lemmon Survey	·	460 m	MPC · JPL
845597	2017 XN_{71}	—	May 11, 2015	Mount Lemmon	Mount Lemmon Survey	ERI	890 m	MPC · JPL
845598	2017 XZ_{71}	—	December 15, 2017	Mount Lemmon	Mount Lemmon Survey	·	810 m	MPC · JPL
845599	2017 XD_{72}	—	April 28, 2014	Cerro Tololo	DECam	·	1.2 km	MPC · JPL
845600	2017 XS_{72}	—	December 15, 2017	Mount Lemmon	Mount Lemmon Survey	·	1.0 km	MPC · JPL

== 845601–845700 ==
back to top

Designation			Discovery			Properties		Ref
Permanent	Provisional	Named after	Date	Site	Discoverer(s)	Category	Diam.	Ref
845601	2017 XB_{74}	—	December 15, 2017	Mount Lemmon	Mount Lemmon Survey	NYS	770 m	MPC · JPL
845602	2017 XU_{74}	—	December 12, 2017	Haleakala	Pan-STARRS 1	V	500 m	MPC · JPL
845603	2017 XW_{74}	—	December 9, 2017	Mount Lemmon	Mount Lemmon Survey	V	430 m	MPC · JPL
845604	2017 XZ_{78}	—	December 8, 2017	Haleakala	Pan-STARRS 1	·	1.4 km	MPC · JPL
845605	2017 XB_{79}	—	December 8, 2017	Haleakala	Pan-STARRS 1	·	1.2 km	MPC · JPL
845606	2017 XC_{79}	—	December 15, 2017	Mount Lemmon	Mount Lemmon Survey	EUN	930 m	MPC · JPL
845607	2017 XG_{79}	—	December 12, 2017	Haleakala	Pan-STARRS 1	JUN	700 m	MPC · JPL
845608	2017 XM_{79}	—	May 22, 2015	Haleakala	Pan-STARRS 1	·	760 m	MPC · JPL
845609	2017 XR_{79}	—	December 13, 2017	Mount Lemmon	Mount Lemmon Survey	·	1.2 km	MPC · JPL
845610	2017 XL_{80}	—	May 20, 2015	Cerro Tololo	DECam	·	770 m	MPC · JPL
845611	2017 XV_{83}	—	April 18, 2015	Cerro Tololo	DECam	·	1.0 km	MPC · JPL
845612	2017 XG_{86}	—	December 13, 2017	Mount Lemmon	Mount Lemmon Survey	·	840 m	MPC · JPL
845613	2017 XO_{87}	—	December 15, 2017	Mount Lemmon	Mount Lemmon Survey	JUN	800 m	MPC · JPL
845614	2017 XR_{90}	—	December 14, 2017	Haleakala	Pan-STARRS 1	·	1.3 km	MPC · JPL
845615	2017 XU_{90}	—	December 14, 2017	Mount Lemmon	Mount Lemmon Survey	·	1.4 km	MPC · JPL
845616	2017 XF_{91}	—	April 23, 2014	Cerro Tololo	DECam	·	1.9 km	MPC · JPL
845617	2017 XE_{95}	—	November 16, 2017	Mount Lemmon	Mount Lemmon Survey	·	1.3 km	MPC · JPL
845618	2017 YB	—	May 8, 2014	Haleakala	Pan-STARRS 1	·	390 m	MPC · JPL
845619	2017 YG	—	January 10, 2013	Haleakala	Pan-STARRS 1	H	510 m	MPC · JPL
845620	2017 YU	—	December 21, 2017	Mount Lemmon	Mount Lemmon Survey	·	1.1 km	MPC · JPL
845621	2017 YG_{4}	—	December 16, 2017	Mount Lemmon	Mount Lemmon Survey	H	480 m	MPC · JPL
845622	2017 YY_{11}	—	September 9, 2013	Haleakala	Pan-STARRS 1	·	510 m	MPC · JPL
845623	2017 YH_{13}	—	December 22, 2008	Kitt Peak	Spacewatch	·	1.2 km	MPC · JPL
845624	2017 YH_{14}	—	March 16, 2013	Mount Lemmon	Mount Lemmon Survey	·	1.7 km	MPC · JPL
845625	2017 YA_{17}	—	December 25, 2017	Haleakala	Pan-STARRS 1	·	1.3 km	MPC · JPL
845626	2017 YT_{20}	—	April 18, 2015	Cerro Tololo	DECam	·	730 m	MPC · JPL
845627	2017 YZ_{20}	—	December 6, 2012	Mount Lemmon	Mount Lemmon Survey	·	1.4 km	MPC · JPL
845628	2017 YP_{21}	—	April 18, 2015	Cerro Tololo	DECam	·	630 m	MPC · JPL
845629	2017 YK_{25}	—	December 23, 2017	Mount Lemmon	Mount Lemmon Survey	·	1.1 km	MPC · JPL
845630	2017 YN_{25}	—	January 16, 2010	WISE	WISE	·	960 m	MPC · JPL
845631	2017 YL_{27}	—	December 23, 2017	Haleakala	Pan-STARRS 1	·	1.2 km	MPC · JPL
845632	2017 YE_{28}	—	December 20, 2017	Mount Lemmon	Mount Lemmon Survey	·	1.4 km	MPC · JPL
845633	2017 YG_{28}	—	December 26, 2017	Mount Lemmon	Mount Lemmon Survey	·	1.7 km	MPC · JPL
845634	2017 YE_{29}	—	December 20, 2017	Mount Lemmon	Mount Lemmon Survey	·	740 m	MPC · JPL
845635	2017 YJ_{29}	—	December 23, 2017	Haleakala	Pan-STARRS 1	·	590 m	MPC · JPL
845636	2017 YU_{30}	—	December 26, 2017	Mount Lemmon	Mount Lemmon Survey	V	410 m	MPC · JPL
845637	2017 YX_{30}	—	December 24, 2017	Haleakala	Pan-STARRS 1	T_{j} (2.94)	1.7 km	MPC · JPL
845638	2017 YB_{31}	—	December 25, 2017	Haleakala	Pan-STARRS 1	·	1.3 km	MPC · JPL
845639	2017 YE_{32}	—	December 24, 2017	Haleakala	Pan-STARRS 1	·	400 m	MPC · JPL
845640	2017 YV_{32}	—	December 23, 2017	Haleakala	Pan-STARRS 1	V	420 m	MPC · JPL
845641	2017 YQ_{33}	—	December 24, 2017	Haleakala	Pan-STARRS 1	·	1.3 km	MPC · JPL
845642	2017 YG_{34}	—	December 25, 2017	Haleakala	Pan-STARRS 1	·	1.2 km	MPC · JPL
845643	2017 YU_{34}	—	September 7, 2008	Mount Lemmon	Mount Lemmon Survey	·	1.2 km	MPC · JPL
845644	2017 YX_{34}	—	June 2, 2014	Haleakala	Pan-STARRS 1	·	1.5 km	MPC · JPL
845645	2017 YR_{39}	—	December 28, 2017	Mount Lemmon	Mount Lemmon Survey	H	470 m	MPC · JPL
845646	2017 YS_{42}	—	December 23, 2017	Haleakala	Pan-STARRS 1	KOR	920 m	MPC · JPL
845647	2017 YY_{43}	—	December 28, 2017	Mount Lemmon	Mount Lemmon Survey	·	2.3 km	MPC · JPL
845648	2017 YY_{45}	—	December 24, 2017	Haleakala	Pan-STARRS 1	·	1.1 km	MPC · JPL
845649	2017 YO_{47}	—	December 25, 2017	Haleakala	Pan-STARRS 1	GEF	780 m	MPC · JPL
845650	2017 YP_{47}	—	December 23, 2017	Haleakala	Pan-STARRS 1	KOR	960 m	MPC · JPL
845651	2017 YO_{48}	—	December 23, 2017	Haleakala	Pan-STARRS 1	BRA	870 m	MPC · JPL
845652	2017 YT_{49}	—	December 29, 2017	Haleakala	Pan-STARRS 1	·	2.2 km	MPC · JPL
845653	2017 YA_{50}	—	December 28, 2017	Mount Lemmon	Mount Lemmon Survey	PAD	1.1 km	MPC · JPL
845654	2017 YH_{51}	—	November 6, 2013	Catalina	CSS	·	760 m	MPC · JPL
845655	2017 YK_{55}	—	December 26, 2017	Mount Lemmon	Mount Lemmon Survey	PHO	810 m	MPC · JPL
845656	2017 YF_{56}	—	December 23, 2017	Haleakala	Pan-STARRS 1	·	1.2 km	MPC · JPL
845657	2017 YA_{67}	—	December 19, 2017	Mount Lemmon	Mount Lemmon Survey	·	1.9 km	MPC · JPL
845658	2018 AC_{1}	—	December 1, 2013	XuYi	PMO NEO Survey Program	·	1.7 km	MPC · JPL
845659	2018 AW_{2}	—	October 26, 2009	La Sagra	OAM	·	700 m	MPC · JPL
845660	2018 AT_{3}	—	January 12, 2010	Kitt Peak	Spacewatch	·	980 m	MPC · JPL
845661	2018 AH_{6}	—	December 7, 2012	Haleakala	Pan-STARRS 1	·	1.4 km	MPC · JPL
845662	2018 AQ_{6}	—	December 4, 2007	Kitt Peak	Spacewatch	615	970 m	MPC · JPL
845663	2018 AA_{8}	—	April 18, 2015	Cerro Tololo	DECam	V	400 m	MPC · JPL
845664	2018 AY_{12}	—	January 14, 2018	Mount Lemmon	Mount Lemmon Survey	·	290 m	MPC · JPL
845665	2018 AT_{13}	—	August 16, 2010	WISE	WISE	PHO	780 m	MPC · JPL
845666	2018 AM_{14}	—	November 11, 2004	Kitt Peak	Spacewatch	·	1.0 km	MPC · JPL
845667	2018 AS_{15}	—	December 23, 2017	Haleakala	Pan-STARRS 1	·	1.2 km	MPC · JPL
845668	2018 AX_{15}	—	September 22, 2017	Haleakala	Pan-STARRS 1	(5)	970 m	MPC · JPL
845669	2018 AT_{20}	—	January 13, 2018	Mount Lemmon	Mount Lemmon Survey	·	1.9 km	MPC · JPL
845670	2018 AM_{21}	—	January 15, 2018	Haleakala	Pan-STARRS 1	ELF	2.8 km	MPC · JPL
845671	2018 AE_{22}	—	May 21, 2015	Cerro Tololo	DECam	MAS	510 m	MPC · JPL
845672	2018 AE_{23}	—	July 22, 2010	WISE	WISE	·	1.4 km	MPC · JPL
845673	2018 AS_{25}	—	January 12, 2018	Haleakala	Pan-STARRS 1	·	1.5 km	MPC · JPL
845674	2018 AZ_{26}	—	January 14, 2018	Haleakala	Pan-STARRS 1	·	1.0 km	MPC · JPL
845675	2018 AK_{27}	—	May 7, 2014	Haleakala	Pan-STARRS 1	·	1.2 km	MPC · JPL
845676	2018 AL_{27}	—	January 13, 2018	Haleakala	Pan-STARRS 1	·	690 m	MPC · JPL
845677	2018 AN_{29}	—	January 15, 2018	Mount Lemmon	Mount Lemmon Survey	·	2.6 km	MPC · JPL
845678	2018 AM_{31}	—	January 15, 2018	Haleakala	Pan-STARRS 1	·	1.3 km	MPC · JPL
845679	2018 AE_{33}	—	January 15, 2018	Haleakala	Pan-STARRS 1	·	1.4 km	MPC · JPL
845680	2018 AP_{33}	—	January 15, 2018	Haleakala	Pan-STARRS 1	L5	5.6 km	MPC · JPL
845681	2018 AV_{34}	—	January 12, 2018	Haleakala	Pan-STARRS 1	·	2.3 km	MPC · JPL
845682	2018 AC_{36}	—	January 15, 2018	Haleakala	Pan-STARRS 1	·	820 m	MPC · JPL
845683	2018 AM_{37}	—	January 7, 2018	Haleakala	Pan-STARRS 1	·	1.2 km	MPC · JPL
845684	2018 AM_{39}	—	January 14, 2018	Haleakala	Pan-STARRS 1	TIR	2.1 km	MPC · JPL
845685	2018 AW_{40}	—	January 13, 2018	Mount Lemmon	Mount Lemmon Survey	H	370 m	MPC · JPL
845686	2018 AB_{41}	—	January 15, 2018	Haleakala	Pan-STARRS 1	·	810 m	MPC · JPL
845687	2018 AE_{41}	—	January 15, 2018	Mount Lemmon	Mount Lemmon Survey	·	1.6 km	MPC · JPL
845688	2018 AQ_{42}	—	October 19, 2011	Mount Lemmon	Mount Lemmon Survey	KOR	870 m	MPC · JPL
845689	2018 AM_{44}	—	January 12, 2018	Haleakala	Pan-STARRS 1	·	830 m	MPC · JPL
845690	2018 AT_{44}	—	January 15, 2018	Haleakala	Pan-STARRS 1	EOS	1.1 km	MPC · JPL
845691	2018 AY_{45}	—	January 14, 2018	Haleakala	Pan-STARRS 1	·	2.0 km	MPC · JPL
845692	2018 AJ_{48}	—	April 28, 2014	Cerro Tololo	DECam	·	1.2 km	MPC · JPL
845693	2018 AL_{50}	—	January 11, 2018	Haleakala	Pan-STARRS 1	KOR	1.0 km	MPC · JPL
845694	2018 AT_{52}	—	May 20, 2015	Cerro Tololo	DECam	·	710 m	MPC · JPL
845695	2018 AC_{58}	—	January 14, 2018	Haleakala	Pan-STARRS 1	·	2.3 km	MPC · JPL
845696	2018 AP_{71}	—	January 15, 2018	Haleakala	Pan-STARRS 1	·	2.0 km	MPC · JPL
845697	2018 AC_{80}	—	January 15, 2018	Haleakala	Pan-STARRS 1	·	1.4 km	MPC · JPL
845698	2018 AP_{85}	—	January 12, 2018	Mount Lemmon	Mount Lemmon Survey	·	2.2 km	MPC · JPL
845699	2018 BE_{2}	—	July 19, 2010	WISE	WISE	T_{j} (2.98)	3.4 km	MPC · JPL
845700	2018 BU_{9}	—	October 6, 2012	Mount Lemmon	Mount Lemmon Survey	·	1.2 km	MPC · JPL

== 845701–845800 ==
back to top

Designation			Discovery			Properties		Ref
Permanent	Provisional	Named after	Date	Site	Discoverer(s)	Category	Diam.	Ref
845701	2018 BV_{9}	—	October 26, 2013	Mount Lemmon	Mount Lemmon Survey	·	720 m	MPC · JPL
845702	2018 BO_{13}	—	May 20, 2015	Cerro Tololo	DECam	·	600 m	MPC · JPL
845703	2018 BY_{14}	—	January 20, 2018	Haleakala	Pan-STARRS 1	·	1.8 km	MPC · JPL
845704	2018 BV_{16}	—	January 16, 2018	Haleakala	Pan-STARRS 1	·	1.1 km	MPC · JPL
845705	2018 BR_{17}	—	January 20, 2018	Haleakala	Pan-STARRS 1	·	2.0 km	MPC · JPL
845706	2018 BJ_{18}	—	January 16, 2018	Haleakala	Pan-STARRS 1	EOS	1.2 km	MPC · JPL
845707	2018 BX_{19}	—	January 20, 2018	Mount Lemmon	Mount Lemmon Survey	TIR	2.1 km	MPC · JPL
845708	2018 BF_{20}	—	January 16, 2018	Haleakala	Pan-STARRS 1	·	620 m	MPC · JPL
845709	2018 BJ_{20}	—	January 16, 2018	Haleakala	Pan-STARRS 1	·	940 m	MPC · JPL
845710	2018 BV_{20}	—	January 20, 2018	Haleakala	Pan-STARRS 1	KOR	950 m	MPC · JPL
845711	2018 BE_{21}	—	January 20, 2018	Haleakala	Pan-STARRS 1	·	1.5 km	MPC · JPL
845712	2018 BC_{23}	—	January 23, 2018	Mount Lemmon	Mount Lemmon Survey	·	550 m	MPC · JPL
845713	2018 BM_{24}	—	January 19, 2018	Mount Lemmon	Mount Lemmon Survey	H	380 m	MPC · JPL
845714	2018 BR_{24}	—	January 16, 2018	Haleakala	Pan-STARRS 1	·	1.1 km	MPC · JPL
845715	2018 BH_{25}	—	February 27, 2001	Kitt Peak	Spacewatch	·	620 m	MPC · JPL
845716	2018 BN_{25}	—	September 11, 2016	Mount Lemmon	Mount Lemmon Survey	·	1.3 km	MPC · JPL
845717	2018 BR_{27}	—	November 22, 2012	Kitt Peak	Spacewatch	·	1.4 km	MPC · JPL
845718	2018 BA_{28}	—	January 20, 2018	Haleakala	Pan-STARRS 1	·	2.0 km	MPC · JPL
845719	2018 BR_{29}	—	December 30, 2007	Kitt Peak	Spacewatch	·	1.5 km	MPC · JPL
845720	2018 BZ_{29}	—	June 2, 2014	Haleakala	Pan-STARRS 1	·	1.8 km	MPC · JPL
845721	2018 BR_{30}	—	January 17, 2018	Haleakala	Pan-STARRS 1	·	1.6 km	MPC · JPL
845722	2018 BV_{31}	—	January 20, 2018	Haleakala	Pan-STARRS 1	EOS	1.2 km	MPC · JPL
845723	2018 BN_{34}	—	January 16, 2018	Haleakala	Pan-STARRS 1	KOR	1.1 km	MPC · JPL
845724	2018 BK_{43}	—	January 20, 2018	Haleakala	Pan-STARRS 1	·	710 m	MPC · JPL
845725	2018 BL_{44}	—	January 20, 2018	Haleakala	Pan-STARRS 1	·	2.1 km	MPC · JPL
845726	2018 BS_{44}	—	January 16, 2018	Haleakala	Pan-STARRS 1	(260)	2.3 km	MPC · JPL
845727	2018 BA_{46}	—	January 16, 2018	Haleakala	Pan-STARRS 1	·	2.4 km	MPC · JPL
845728	2018 BU_{46}	—	January 28, 2018	Mount Lemmon	Mount Lemmon Survey	·	2.8 km	MPC · JPL
845729	2018 BG_{52}	—	January 16, 2018	Haleakala	Pan-STARRS 1	·	2.3 km	MPC · JPL
845730	2018 BQ_{52}	—	March 30, 2008	Kitt Peak	Spacewatch	·	2.1 km	MPC · JPL
845731	2018 BP_{95}	—	July 22, 2020	Haleakala	Pan-STARRS 1	·	1.1 km	MPC · JPL
845732	2018 BA_{131}	—	January 20, 2018	Haleakala	Pan-STARRS 1	·	2.0 km	MPC · JPL
845733	2018 BD_{131}	—	January 20, 2018	Haleakala	Pan-STARRS 1	·	2.3 km	MPC · JPL
845734	2018 CJ_{1}	—	February 6, 2018	Mount Lemmon	Mount Lemmon Survey	·	850 m	MPC · JPL
845735	2018 CV_{3}	—	February 13, 2010	WISE	WISE	·	1.4 km	MPC · JPL
845736	2018 CE_{4}	—	January 27, 2010	WISE	WISE	·	1.3 km	MPC · JPL
845737	2018 CW_{5}	—	June 2, 2010	WISE	WISE	·	4.4 km	MPC · JPL
845738	2018 CA_{9}	—	February 1, 2010	WISE	WISE	·	1.4 km	MPC · JPL
845739	2018 CX_{9}	—	July 26, 2010	WISE	WISE	·	3.8 km	MPC · JPL
845740	2018 CD_{10}	—	February 15, 2010	Catalina	CSS	·	1.2 km	MPC · JPL
845741	2018 CE_{10}	—	July 2, 2010	WISE	WISE	·	2.0 km	MPC · JPL
845742	2018 CV_{12}	—	January 13, 2018	Mount Lemmon	Mount Lemmon Survey	·	740 m	MPC · JPL
845743	2018 CQ_{14}	—	February 28, 2008	Kitt Peak	Spacewatch	H	310 m	MPC · JPL
845744	2018 CV_{17}	—	February 17, 2007	Kitt Peak	Spacewatch	·	2.3 km	MPC · JPL
845745	2018 CZ_{17}	—	February 12, 2018	Haleakala	Pan-STARRS 1	·	1.3 km	MPC · JPL
845746	2018 CZ_{18}	—	February 12, 2018	Haleakala	Pan-STARRS 1	·	2.4 km	MPC · JPL
845747	2018 CG_{19}	—	February 12, 2018	Haleakala	Pan-STARRS 1	BAR	800 m	MPC · JPL
845748	2018 CQ_{19}	—	October 24, 2005	Kitt Peak	Spacewatch	·	1.8 km	MPC · JPL
845749	2018 CK_{20}	—	February 12, 2018	Haleakala	Pan-STARRS 1	·	1.5 km	MPC · JPL
845750	2018 CV_{20}	—	February 12, 2018	Haleakala	Pan-STARRS 1	·	1.3 km	MPC · JPL
845751	2018 CW_{20}	—	February 5, 2018	Mount Lemmon	Mount Lemmon Survey	·	2.2 km	MPC · JPL
845752	2018 CR_{23}	—	January 13, 2018	Haleakala	Pan-STARRS 1	TIR	2.3 km	MPC · JPL
845753	2018 CN_{26}	—	February 12, 2018	Haleakala	Pan-STARRS 1	·	1.7 km	MPC · JPL
845754	2018 CG_{27}	—	February 12, 2018	Haleakala	Pan-STARRS 1	·	1.9 km	MPC · JPL
845755	2018 CJ_{27}	—	February 10, 2018	Haleakala	Pan-STARRS 1	·	1.4 km	MPC · JPL
845756	2018 CF_{28}	—	February 11, 2018	Haleakala	Pan-STARRS 1	·	1.9 km	MPC · JPL
845757	2018 CV_{32}	—	February 12, 2018	Haleakala	Pan-STARRS 1	·	1.4 km	MPC · JPL
845758	2018 CM_{35}	—	March 12, 2013	Mount Lemmon	Mount Lemmon Survey	·	1.5 km	MPC · JPL
845759	2018 DO_{1}	—	July 26, 2008	Siding Spring	SSS	H	440 m	MPC · JPL
845760	2018 DS_{3}	—	February 26, 2018	Mount Lemmon	Mount Lemmon Survey	H	440 m	MPC · JPL
845761	2018 DW_{5}	—	February 25, 2018	Mount Lemmon	Mount Lemmon Survey	JUN	890 m	MPC · JPL
845762	2018 DE_{6}	—	February 17, 2018	Mount Lemmon	Mount Lemmon Survey	EOS	1.5 km	MPC · JPL
845763	2018 DH_{6}	—	October 29, 2016	Mount Lemmon	Mount Lemmon Survey	PHO	870 m	MPC · JPL
845764	2018 DL_{8}	—	May 20, 2015	Cerro Tololo	DECam	·	410 m	MPC · JPL
845765	2018 DW_{9}	—	February 23, 2018	Mount Lemmon	Mount Lemmon Survey	·	2.3 km	MPC · JPL
845766	2018 DO_{10}	—	February 25, 2018	Mount Lemmon	Mount Lemmon Survey	·	860 m	MPC · JPL
845767	2018 DR_{10}	—	February 17, 2018	Mount Lemmon	Mount Lemmon Survey	V	440 m	MPC · JPL
845768	2018 DJ_{13}	—	February 21, 2018	Haleakala	Pan-STARRS 1	V	460 m	MPC · JPL
845769	2018 DN_{16}	—	March 9, 2007	Mount Lemmon	Mount Lemmon Survey	LIX	1.9 km	MPC · JPL
845770	2018 EU	—	May 4, 2013	Palomar	Palomar Transient Factory	H	420 m	MPC · JPL
845771	2018 EG_{3}	—	January 20, 2018	Haleakala	Pan-STARRS 1	EOS	1.5 km	MPC · JPL
845772	2018 EW_{5}	—	March 18, 2010	WISE	WISE	PHO	780 m	MPC · JPL
845773	2018 ES_{8}	—	July 28, 2010	WISE	WISE	T_{j} (2.99) · EUP	3.1 km	MPC · JPL
845774	2018 ET_{9}	—	June 19, 2015	Haleakala	Pan-STARRS 1	·	1.9 km	MPC · JPL
845775	2018 EL_{10}	—	March 10, 2018	Haleakala	Pan-STARRS 1	·	1.8 km	MPC · JPL
845776	2018 ED_{11}	—	March 10, 2018	Haleakala	Pan-STARRS 1	·	770 m	MPC · JPL
845777	2018 EH_{11}	—	March 12, 2018	Cerro Paranal	Gaia Ground Based Optical Tracking	EOS	1.3 km	MPC · JPL
845778	2018 EJ_{11}	—	March 7, 2018	Haleakala	Pan-STARRS 1	EOS	1.5 km	MPC · JPL
845779	2018 ES_{12}	—	March 10, 2018	Haleakala	Pan-STARRS 1	EOS	1.6 km	MPC · JPL
845780	2018 EZ_{14}	—	March 7, 2018	Haleakala	Pan-STARRS 1	·	1.8 km	MPC · JPL
845781	2018 EX_{15}	—	March 10, 2018	Haleakala	Pan-STARRS 1	·	1.4 km	MPC · JPL
845782	2018 FK_{6}	—	March 16, 2007	Mount Lemmon	Mount Lemmon Survey	THM	1.7 km	MPC · JPL
845783	2018 FU_{7}	—	July 13, 2010	WISE	WISE	T_{j} (2.98) · EUP	2.5 km	MPC · JPL
845784	2018 FR_{8}	—	June 30, 2014	Haleakala	Pan-STARRS 1	·	1.7 km	MPC · JPL
845785	2018 FE_{9}	—	October 9, 2015	Haleakala	Pan-STARRS 1	·	1.9 km	MPC · JPL
845786	2018 FC_{10}	—	January 26, 2012	Mount Lemmon	Mount Lemmon Survey	THM	1.6 km	MPC · JPL
845787	2018 FQ_{11}	—	August 21, 2015	Haleakala	Pan-STARRS 1	·	1.5 km	MPC · JPL
845788	2018 FY_{12}	—	March 17, 2018	Haleakala	Pan-STARRS 1	·	780 m	MPC · JPL
845789	2018 FR_{15}	—	February 21, 2007	Kitt Peak	Spacewatch	·	830 m	MPC · JPL
845790	2018 FD_{16}	—	March 2, 2009	Mount Lemmon	Mount Lemmon Survey	·	1.6 km	MPC · JPL
845791	2018 FM_{17}	—	August 25, 2012	Haleakala	Pan-STARRS 1	V	490 m	MPC · JPL
845792	2018 FA_{22}	—	September 3, 2016	Mount Lemmon	Mount Lemmon Survey	·	800 m	MPC · JPL
845793	2018 FC_{22}	—	February 3, 2012	Haleakala	Pan-STARRS 1	·	2.0 km	MPC · JPL
845794	2018 FT_{27}	—	November 3, 2005	Mount Lemmon	Mount Lemmon Survey	T_{j} (2.98) · 3:2	5.1 km	MPC · JPL
845795	2018 FD_{28}	—	October 8, 2008	Mount Lemmon	Mount Lemmon Survey	(5)	740 m	MPC · JPL
845796	2018 FF_{28}	—	February 13, 2010	Catalina	CSS	·	2.2 km	MPC · JPL
845797	2018 FJ_{28}	—	March 16, 2007	Mount Lemmon	Mount Lemmon Survey	·	1.8 km	MPC · JPL
845798	2018 FA_{29}	—	October 25, 2005	Kitt Peak	Spacewatch	·	920 m	MPC · JPL
845799	2018 FV_{30}	—	March 17, 2018	Haleakala	Pan-STARRS 1	T_{j} (2.99) · EUP	2.1 km	MPC · JPL
845800	2018 FJ_{33}	—	March 27, 2018	Mount Lemmon	Mount Lemmon Survey	·	2.8 km	MPC · JPL

== 845801–845900 ==
back to top

Designation			Discovery			Properties		Ref
Permanent	Provisional	Named after	Date	Site	Discoverer(s)	Category	Diam.	Ref
845801	2018 FQ_{33}	—	April 2, 2010	WISE	WISE	PHO	920 m	MPC · JPL
845802	2018 FW_{33}	—	March 17, 2018	Haleakala	Pan-STARRS 1	·	600 m	MPC · JPL
845803	2018 FL_{34}	—	March 18, 2018	Haleakala	Pan-STARRS 1	CLA	1.2 km	MPC · JPL
845804	2018 FT_{34}	—	March 18, 2018	Haleakala	Pan-STARRS 1	·	510 m	MPC · JPL
845805	2018 FM_{35}	—	March 18, 2018	Haleakala	Pan-STARRS 1	·	1.9 km	MPC · JPL
845806	2018 FV_{37}	—	March 16, 2018	Mount Lemmon	Mount Lemmon Survey	·	1.7 km	MPC · JPL
845807	2018 FF_{38}	—	March 19, 2018	Mount Lemmon	Mount Lemmon Survey	·	1.8 km	MPC · JPL
845808	2018 FL_{38}	—	March 18, 2018	Haleakala	Pan-STARRS 1	·	2.2 km	MPC · JPL
845809	2018 FG_{39}	—	March 18, 2018	Haleakala	Pan-STARRS 1	·	820 m	MPC · JPL
845810	2018 FO_{42}	—	February 10, 2014	Mount Lemmon	Mount Lemmon Survey	·	990 m	MPC · JPL
845811	2018 FK_{43}	—	March 19, 2018	Mount Lemmon	Mount Lemmon Survey	·	1.4 km	MPC · JPL
845812	2018 FS_{48}	—	March 18, 2018	Haleakala	Pan-STARRS 1	V	550 m	MPC · JPL
845813	2018 FV_{48}	—	March 17, 2018	Haleakala	Pan-STARRS 1	EOS	1.3 km	MPC · JPL
845814	2018 FY_{48}	—	March 18, 2018	Haleakala	Pan-STARRS 1	·	510 m	MPC · JPL
845815	2018 FQ_{49}	—	March 18, 2018	Haleakala	Pan-STARRS 1	·	1.9 km	MPC · JPL
845816	2018 FA_{56}	—	January 5, 2017	Mount Lemmon	Mount Lemmon Survey	·	2.2 km	MPC · JPL
845817	2018 FH_{60}	—	March 17, 2018	Mount Lemmon	Mount Lemmon Survey	·	450 m	MPC · JPL
845818	2018 FZ_{60}	—	March 17, 2018	Mount Lemmon	Mount Lemmon Survey	·	2.2 km	MPC · JPL
845819	2018 FK_{66}	—	March 17, 2018	Haleakala	Pan-STARRS 1	L5	6.8 km	MPC · JPL
845820	2018 FH_{68}	—	March 18, 2018	Haleakala	Pan-STARRS 1	EOS	1.3 km	MPC · JPL
845821	2018 FS_{68}	—	March 19, 2018	Haleakala	Pan-STARRS 1	·	2.0 km	MPC · JPL
845822	2018 FP_{69}	—	March 22, 2018	Mount Lemmon	Mount Lemmon Survey	·	2.6 km	MPC · JPL
845823	2018 FM_{70}	—	March 19, 2018	Mount Lemmon	Mount Lemmon Survey	THM	1.8 km	MPC · JPL
845824	2018 GK_{5}	—	February 10, 2008	Kitt Peak	Spacewatch	H	330 m	MPC · JPL
845825	2018 GC_{7}	—	January 18, 2013	Westfield	International Astronomical Search Collaboration	NEM	1.7 km	MPC · JPL
845826	2018 GJ_{12}	—	April 12, 2018	Cerro Paranal	Gaia Ground Based Optical Tracking	·	2.1 km	MPC · JPL
845827	2018 GP_{16}	—	April 15, 2018	Mount Lemmon	Mount Lemmon Survey	H	370 m	MPC · JPL
845828	2018 GK_{18}	—	April 12, 2018	Haleakala	Pan-STARRS 1	PHO	520 m	MPC · JPL
845829	2018 GM_{18}	—	April 11, 2018	Mount Lemmon	Mount Lemmon Survey	(895)	3.1 km	MPC · JPL
845830	2018 GL_{24}	—	April 13, 2018	Haleakala	Pan-STARRS 1	·	610 m	MPC · JPL
845831	2018 GD_{28}	—	April 12, 2018	Haleakala	Pan-STARRS 1	HYG	1.9 km	MPC · JPL
845832	2018 GU_{31}	—	April 13, 2018	Haleakala	Pan-STARRS 1	·	2.0 km	MPC · JPL
845833	2018 GC_{35}	—	August 31, 2014	Mount Lemmon	Mount Lemmon Survey	T_{j} (2.92)	2.4 km	MPC · JPL
845834	2018 HC_{3}	—	March 18, 2018	Haleakala	Pan-STARRS 1	·	2.5 km	MPC · JPL
845835	2018 HO_{5}	—	April 19, 2018	Mount Lemmon	Mount Lemmon Survey	·	1.3 km	MPC · JPL
845836	2018 HM_{8}	—	March 11, 2005	Kitt Peak	Spacewatch	·	1.1 km	MPC · JPL
845837	2018 HM_{9}	—	April 19, 2018	Mount Lemmon	Mount Lemmon Survey	·	580 m	MPC · JPL
845838	2018 JC_{3}	—	April 23, 2004	Kitt Peak	Spacewatch	AMO	370 m	MPC · JPL
845839	2018 JH_{4}	—	March 20, 2007	Catalina	CSS	·	2.0 km	MPC · JPL
845840	2018 JU_{4}	—	March 27, 2018	Mount Lemmon	Mount Lemmon Survey	·	1.0 km	MPC · JPL
845841	2018 JX_{5}	—	August 28, 2014	Haleakala	Pan-STARRS 1	·	1.3 km	MPC · JPL
845842	2018 JE_{7}	—	May 7, 2018	Kitt Peak	Spacewatch	EUP	3.0 km	MPC · JPL
845843	2018 JR_{9}	—	May 13, 2018	Mount Lemmon	Mount Lemmon Survey	·	2.0 km	MPC · JPL
845844	2018 JD_{11}	—	April 23, 2018	Mount Lemmon	Mount Lemmon Survey	EUN	820 m	MPC · JPL
845845	2018 JH_{13}	—	April 21, 2018	Mount Lemmon	Mount Lemmon Survey	·	550 m	MPC · JPL
845846	2018 KH_{6}	—	May 20, 2018	Haleakala	Pan-STARRS 1	·	480 m	MPC · JPL
845847	2018 KC_{8}	—	April 19, 2018	Mount Lemmon	Mount Lemmon Survey	·	540 m	MPC · JPL
845848	2018 KA_{9}	—	May 21, 2018	Haleakala	Pan-STARRS 1	·	530 m	MPC · JPL
845849	2018 KX_{11}	—	May 21, 2018	Haleakala	Pan-STARRS 1	·	2.1 km	MPC · JPL
845850	2018 KB_{19}	—	April 6, 2011	Mount Lemmon	Mount Lemmon Survey	·	490 m	MPC · JPL
845851	2018 KF_{24}	—	October 11, 2012	Haleakala	Pan-STARRS 1	·	620 m	MPC · JPL
845852	2018 LD_{11}	—	May 23, 2010	WISE	WISE	·	1.6 km	MPC · JPL
845853	2018 LX_{13}	—	May 28, 2009	Mount Lemmon	Mount Lemmon Survey	·	1.1 km	MPC · JPL
845854	2018 LF_{16}	—	September 24, 2014	Mount Lemmon	Mount Lemmon Survey	·	320 m	MPC · JPL
845855	2018 LU_{18}	—	June 10, 2018	Haleakala	Pan-STARRS 1	·	1.1 km	MPC · JPL
845856	2018 LJ_{22}	—	June 6, 2018	Haleakala	Pan-STARRS 1	·	2.7 km	MPC · JPL
845857	2018 LZ_{22}	—	June 13, 2018	ESA OGS	ESA OGS	H	420 m	MPC · JPL
845858	2018 LN_{24}	—	June 15, 2018	Haleakala	Pan-STARRS 1	·	1.4 km	MPC · JPL
845859	2018 LD_{25}	—	June 14, 2018	Haleakala	Pan-STARRS 1	·	920 m	MPC · JPL
845860	2018 LO_{26}	—	June 6, 2018	Haleakala	Pan-STARRS 1	·	550 m	MPC · JPL
845861	2018 LE_{27}	—	June 5, 2018	Haleakala	Pan-STARRS 1	·	920 m	MPC · JPL
845862	2018 LK_{32}	—	June 15, 2018	Haleakala	Pan-STARRS 1	L4 · ERY	5.5 km	MPC · JPL
845863	2018 LM_{36}	—	June 5, 2018	Haleakala	Pan-STARRS 1	·	1.2 km	MPC · JPL
845864	2018 LA_{61}	—	June 15, 2018	Haleakala	Pan-STARRS 1	L4	5.9 km	MPC · JPL
845865	2018 MG_{4}	—	June 16, 2018	Haleakala	Pan-STARRS 2	H	350 m	MPC · JPL
845866	2018 ME_{6}	—	November 10, 2016	Haleakala	Pan-STARRS 1	H	470 m	MPC · JPL
845867	2018 MW_{17}	—	June 16, 2018	Haleakala	Pan-STARRS 1	V	400 m	MPC · JPL
845868	2018 MM_{18}	—	June 17, 2018	Haleakala	Pan-STARRS 1	·	660 m	MPC · JPL
845869	2018 MO_{19}	—	April 21, 2014	Mount Lemmon	Mount Lemmon Survey	·	490 m	MPC · JPL
845870	2018 MN_{20}	—	June 17, 2018	Haleakala	Pan-STARRS 1	NYS	930 m	MPC · JPL
845871	2018 MH_{22}	—	June 17, 2018	Haleakala	Pan-STARRS 1	·	760 m	MPC · JPL
845872	2018 MM_{27}	—	January 1, 2017	Oukaïmeden	C. Rinner	THB	1.9 km	MPC · JPL
845873	2018 NK	—	August 17, 2002	Socorro	LINEAR	·	1.9 km	MPC · JPL
845874	2018 NL_{7}	—	June 18, 2018	Haleakala	Pan-STARRS 1	·	500 m	MPC · JPL
845875	2018 NB_{11}	—	August 28, 2006	Kitt Peak	Spacewatch	·	780 m	MPC · JPL
845876	2018 NF_{14}	—	July 11, 2018	XuYi	PMO NEO Survey Program	·	1.4 km	MPC · JPL
845877	2018 NB_{16}	—	June 15, 2018	Haleakala	Pan-STARRS 1	VER	2.0 km	MPC · JPL
845878	2018 ND_{16}	—	May 28, 2010	WISE	WISE	·	3.1 km	MPC · JPL
845879	2018 NE_{16}	—	November 19, 2007	Kitt Peak	Spacewatch	·	2.5 km	MPC · JPL
845880	2018 NQ_{20}	—	July 11, 2018	Haleakala	Pan-STARRS 1	·	860 m	MPC · JPL
845881	2018 NJ_{21}	—	March 28, 2016	Cerro Tololo	DECam	·	1.8 km	MPC · JPL
845882	2018 ND_{22}	—	July 8, 2018	Haleakala	Pan-STARRS 1	·	1.5 km	MPC · JPL
845883	2018 NB_{23}	—	August 21, 2000	Anderson Mesa	LONEOS	·	1.7 km	MPC · JPL
845884	2018 NG_{23}	—	July 11, 2018	Haleakala	Pan-STARRS 1	H	310 m	MPC · JPL
845885	2018 NO_{25}	—	July 12, 2018	Haleakala	Pan-STARRS 2	·	920 m	MPC · JPL
845886	2018 NV_{26}	—	April 3, 2016	Haleakala	Pan-STARRS 1	·	1.8 km	MPC · JPL
845887	2018 NV_{32}	—	January 15, 2015	Mount Lemmon	Mount Lemmon Survey	·	2.0 km	MPC · JPL
845888	2018 NP_{35}	—	July 23, 2010	WISE	WISE	PHO	570 m	MPC · JPL
845889	2018 NK_{41}	—	July 12, 2018	Haleakala	Pan-STARRS 2	·	2.3 km	MPC · JPL
845890	2018 ND_{44}	—	July 8, 2018	Haleakala	Pan-STARRS 1	L4	5.8 km	MPC · JPL
845891	2018 NP_{65}	—	October 3, 2014	Mount Lemmon	Mount Lemmon Survey	·	1.3 km	MPC · JPL
845892	2018 NZ_{66}	—	July 13, 2018	Haleakala	Pan-STARRS 1	EUN	940 m	MPC · JPL
845893	2018 NS_{69}	—	July 8, 2018	Haleakala	Pan-STARRS 1	·	1.3 km	MPC · JPL
845894	2018 PX_{6}	—	August 5, 2018	Haleakala	Pan-STARRS 1	·	2.1 km	MPC · JPL
845895	2018 PA_{11}	—	June 15, 2018	Haleakala	Pan-STARRS 1	·	1.8 km	MPC · JPL
845896	2018 PJ_{11}	—	April 9, 2014	Haleakala	Pan-STARRS 1	·	690 m	MPC · JPL
845897	2018 PS_{11}	—	February 7, 2010	Mount Lemmon	Mount Lemmon Survey	·	1.0 km	MPC · JPL
845898	2018 PZ_{13}	—	September 5, 2000	Sacramento Peak	SDSS	GEF	860 m	MPC · JPL
845899	2018 PC_{14}	—	August 25, 2001	Kitt Peak	Spacewatch	·	2.9 km	MPC · JPL
845900	2018 PN_{15}	—	February 10, 2016	Haleakala	Pan-STARRS 1	TIN	820 m	MPC · JPL

== 845901–846000 ==
back to top

Designation			Discovery			Properties		Ref
Permanent	Provisional	Named after	Date	Site	Discoverer(s)	Category	Diam.	Ref
845901	2018 PW_{16}	—	February 26, 2014	Haleakala	Pan-STARRS 1	NYS	600 m	MPC · JPL
845902	2018 PL_{34}	—	August 15, 2018	Haleakala	Pan-STARRS 1	·	980 m	MPC · JPL
845903	2018 PE_{36}	—	August 13, 2018	Haleakala	Pan-STARRS 1	·	2.1 km	MPC · JPL
845904	2018 PL_{44}	—	August 12, 2018	Haleakala	Pan-STARRS 1	JUN	760 m	MPC · JPL
845905	2018 PV_{44}	—	August 8, 2018	Haleakala	Pan-STARRS 1	·	1.6 km	MPC · JPL
845906	2018 PZ_{44}	—	August 6, 2018	Haleakala	Pan-STARRS 1	·	860 m	MPC · JPL
845907	2018 PQ_{45}	—	August 7, 2018	Haleakala	Pan-STARRS 1	·	1.4 km	MPC · JPL
845908	2018 PG_{48}	—	August 12, 2018	Haleakala	Pan-STARRS 1	·	2.1 km	MPC · JPL
845909	2018 PD_{57}	—	August 8, 2018	Haleakala	Pan-STARRS 1	·	770 m	MPC · JPL
845910	2018 PG_{57}	—	August 8, 2018	Haleakala	Pan-STARRS 1	·	820 m	MPC · JPL
845911	2018 PF_{59}	—	March 12, 2016	Haleakala	Pan-STARRS 1	EOS	1.4 km	MPC · JPL
845912	2018 PF_{61}	—	August 8, 2018	Haleakala	Pan-STARRS 1	·	490 m	MPC · JPL
845913	2018 PW_{69}	—	April 1, 2016	Haleakala	Pan-STARRS 1	·	2.0 km	MPC · JPL
845914	2018 PL_{73}	—	August 6, 2018	Haleakala	Pan-STARRS 1	·	870 m	MPC · JPL
845915	2018 PK_{74}	—	January 26, 2015	Haleakala	Pan-STARRS 1	VER	2.2 km	MPC · JPL
845916	2018 PR_{76}	—	November 20, 2014	Haleakala	Pan-STARRS 1	BRA	1.1 km	MPC · JPL
845917	2018 PF_{81}	—	August 14, 2018	Haleakala	Pan-STARRS 1	·	910 m	MPC · JPL
845918	2018 PQ_{87}	—	August 5, 2018	Haleakala	Pan-STARRS 1	·	1.3 km	MPC · JPL
845919	2018 PZ_{99}	—	August 13, 2018	Haleakala	Pan-STARRS 1	VER	1.8 km	MPC · JPL
845920	2018 PL_{131}	—	February 11, 2016	Haleakala	Pan-STARRS 1	·	1.4 km	MPC · JPL
845921	2018 PK_{164}	—	August 8, 2018	Haleakala	Pan-STARRS 1	·	770 m	MPC · JPL
845922	2018 PN_{165}	—	August 7, 2018	Haleakala	Pan-STARRS 1	·	1.9 km	MPC · JPL
845923	2018 QN_{4}	—	August 22, 2014	Haleakala	Pan-STARRS 1	·	930 m	MPC · JPL
845924	2018 QV_{5}	—	August 8, 2012	Haleakala	Pan-STARRS 1	·	3.0 km	MPC · JPL
845925	2018 QX_{5}	—	April 19, 2013	Haleakala	Pan-STARRS 1	·	1.3 km	MPC · JPL
845926	2018 QD_{6}	—	August 31, 2005	Anderson Mesa	LONEOS	·	570 m	MPC · JPL
845927	2018 QU_{6}	—	October 2, 2009	Mount Lemmon	Mount Lemmon Survey	·	1.4 km	MPC · JPL
845928	2018 QW_{7}	—	November 19, 2003	Catalina	CSS	·	950 m	MPC · JPL
845929	2018 QC_{12}	—	August 18, 2018	Haleakala	Pan-STARRS 1	·	870 m	MPC · JPL
845930	2018 QM_{13}	—	August 18, 2018	Haleakala	Pan-STARRS 1	H	310 m	MPC · JPL
845931	2018 QV_{14}	—	August 19, 2018	Haleakala	Pan-STARRS 1	·	1.6 km	MPC · JPL
845932	2018 QQ_{36}	—	August 18, 2018	Haleakala	Pan-STARRS 1	·	960 m	MPC · JPL
845933	2018 RE_{13}	—	November 21, 2003	Kitt Peak	Spacewatch	·	1.2 km	MPC · JPL
845934	2018 RU_{13}	—	September 20, 2011	Catalina	CSS	·	700 m	MPC · JPL
845935	2018 RH_{15}	—	August 31, 2000	Socorro	LINEAR	·	840 m	MPC · JPL
845936	2018 RR_{16}	—	September 7, 2018	Mount Lemmon	Mount Lemmon Survey	EUN	960 m	MPC · JPL
845937	2018 RS_{17}	—	July 27, 2010	WISE	WISE	·	1.8 km	MPC · JPL
845938	2018 RS_{19}	—	May 23, 2014	Haleakala	Pan-STARRS 1	·	510 m	MPC · JPL
845939	2018 RT_{19}	—	July 22, 2010	WISE	WISE	·	1.2 km	MPC · JPL
845940	2018 RM_{23}	—	October 25, 2014	Mount Lemmon	Mount Lemmon Survey	·	880 m	MPC · JPL
845941	2018 RH_{25}	—	September 11, 2018	XuYi	PMO NEO Survey Program	·	700 m	MPC · JPL
845942	2018 RT_{28}	—	August 24, 2007	Kitt Peak	Spacewatch	·	2.9 km	MPC · JPL
845943	2018 RN_{29}	—	September 2, 2014	Haleakala	Pan-STARRS 1	·	780 m	MPC · JPL
845944	2018 RB_{36}	—	October 23, 2013	Catalina	CSS	·	1.5 km	MPC · JPL
845945	2018 RH_{37}	—	September 3, 2018	Palomar Mountain	Zwicky Transient Facility	PHO	770 m	MPC · JPL
845946	2018 RO_{40}	—	September 10, 2018	Mount Lemmon	Mount Lemmon Survey	·	1.9 km	MPC · JPL
845947	2018 RN_{46}	—	September 12, 2018	Mount Lemmon	Mount Lemmon Survey	·	800 m	MPC · JPL
845948	2018 RQ_{48}	—	September 8, 2018	Mount Lemmon	Mount Lemmon Survey	EUP	2.3 km	MPC · JPL
845949	2018 RL_{50}	—	September 11, 2018	Mount Lemmon	Mount Lemmon Survey	·	2.1 km	MPC · JPL
845950	2018 RP_{56}	—	September 10, 2018	Mount Lemmon	Mount Lemmon Survey	·	1.2 km	MPC · JPL
845951	2018 RQ_{56}	—	September 11, 2018	Mount Lemmon	Mount Lemmon Survey	(5)	1.1 km	MPC · JPL
845952	2018 RY_{58}	—	September 12, 2018	Mount Lemmon	Mount Lemmon Survey	EOS	1.4 km	MPC · JPL
845953	2018 RN_{63}	—	September 13, 2018	Mount Lemmon	Mount Lemmon Survey	·	1.5 km	MPC · JPL
845954	2018 RQ_{69}	—	September 6, 2018	Mount Lemmon	Mount Lemmon Survey	·	650 m	MPC · JPL
845955	2018 RK_{74}	—	September 9, 2007	Mount Lemmon	Mount Lemmon Survey	THM	1.7 km	MPC · JPL
845956	2018 SG_{1}	—	February 5, 2016	Haleakala	Pan-STARRS 1	·	720 m	MPC · JPL
845957	2018 SW_{1}	—	August 14, 2001	Palomar	NEAT	·	2.0 km	MPC · JPL
845958	2018 SM_{9}	—	August 31, 2011	Haleakala	Pan-STARRS 1	·	490 m	MPC · JPL
845959	2018 SA_{10}	—	September 22, 2011	Kitt Peak	Spacewatch	·	700 m	MPC · JPL
845960	2018 SG_{11}	—	March 29, 2008	Kitt Peak	Spacewatch	·	1.7 km	MPC · JPL
845961	2018 SD_{14}	—	December 9, 2015	Haleakala	Pan-STARRS 1	PHO	1.1 km	MPC · JPL
845962	2018 SK_{15}	—	October 15, 2015	Mount Lemmon	Mount Lemmon Survey	·	560 m	MPC · JPL
845963	2018 SU_{16}	—	September 21, 2018	Mount Lemmon	Mount Lemmon Survey	·	940 m	MPC · JPL
845964	2018 SZ_{18}	—	September 19, 2018	Haleakala	Pan-STARRS 2	3:2	4.0 km	MPC · JPL
845965	2018 SD_{20}	—	September 19, 2018	Haleakala	Pan-STARRS 2	·	1.2 km	MPC · JPL
845966	2018 TA_{4}	—	August 12, 2018	Haleakala	Pan-STARRS 1	H	410 m	MPC · JPL
845967	2018 TM_{5}	—	May 5, 2014	Mount Lemmon	Mount Lemmon Survey	·	680 m	MPC · JPL
845968	2018 TX_{7}	—	October 4, 2018	Haleakala	Pan-STARRS 2	·	1.9 km	MPC · JPL
845969	2018 TW_{10}	—	March 13, 2016	Haleakala	Pan-STARRS 1	TIR	1.8 km	MPC · JPL
845970	2018 TM_{14}	—	September 12, 2014	Haleakala	Pan-STARRS 1	NYS	940 m	MPC · JPL
845971	2018 TE_{17}	—	October 4, 2018	Haleakala	Pan-STARRS 2	·	1.3 km	MPC · JPL
845972	2018 TF_{24}	—	October 4, 2018	Haleakala	Pan-STARRS 2	H	270 m	MPC · JPL
845973	2018 TW_{24}	—	October 10, 2018	Haleakala	Pan-STARRS 2	HYG	2.1 km	MPC · JPL
845974	2018 TN_{25}	—	October 5, 2018	Mount Lemmon	Mount Lemmon Survey	·	2.0 km	MPC · JPL
845975	2018 TE_{26}	—	October 4, 2018	Haleakala	Pan-STARRS 2	3:2	4.0 km	MPC · JPL
845976	2018 TY_{26}	—	October 10, 2018	Haleakala	Pan-STARRS 2	·	2.0 km	MPC · JPL
845977	2018 TB_{29}	—	October 4, 2018	Haleakala	Pan-STARRS 2	·	490 m	MPC · JPL
845978	2018 TZ_{33}	—	April 23, 2014	Cerro Tololo	DECam	·	450 m	MPC · JPL
845979	2018 TX_{37}	—	October 10, 2018	Haleakala	Pan-STARRS 2	EOS	1.5 km	MPC · JPL
845980	2018 TP_{40}	—	October 14, 2007	Mount Lemmon	Mount Lemmon Survey	V	450 m	MPC · JPL
845981	2018 TP_{46}	—	January 16, 2015	Haleakala	Pan-STARRS 1	·	1.4 km	MPC · JPL
845982	2018 TP_{49}	—	October 5, 2018	Haleakala	Pan-STARRS 2	·	2.1 km	MPC · JPL
845983	2018 TA_{53}	—	January 29, 2016	Mount Lemmon	Mount Lemmon Survey	·	1.0 km	MPC · JPL
845984	2018 TG_{69}	—	October 5, 2018	Haleakala	Pan-STARRS 2	·	2.3 km	MPC · JPL
845985	2018 TO_{76}	—	October 4, 2018	Haleakala	Pan-STARRS 2	·	1.1 km	MPC · JPL
845986	2018 UJ_{4}	—	September 10, 2007	Mount Lemmon	Mount Lemmon Survey	·	800 m	MPC · JPL
845987	2018 UB_{5}	—	August 8, 2012	Haleakala	Pan-STARRS 1	THB	1.7 km	MPC · JPL
845988	2018 UN_{6}	—	October 5, 2018	Mount Lemmon	Mount Lemmon Survey	·	2.0 km	MPC · JPL
845989	2018 UP_{7}	—	September 26, 2005	Catalina	CSS	·	1.1 km	MPC · JPL
845990	2018 UJ_{9}	—	October 20, 2018	Mount Lemmon	Mount Lemmon Survey	H	330 m	MPC · JPL
845991	2018 UJ_{12}	—	August 20, 2000	Kitt Peak	Spacewatch	·	810 m	MPC · JPL
845992	2018 US_{14}	—	May 21, 2014	Haleakala	Pan-STARRS 1	·	960 m	MPC · JPL
845993	2018 UD_{18}	—	October 30, 2002	Kitt Peak	Spacewatch	·	450 m	MPC · JPL
845994	2018 UN_{20}	—	October 28, 2018	Mount Lemmon	Mount Lemmon Survey	H	440 m	MPC · JPL
845995	2018 UR_{20}	—	October 20, 2018	Mount Lemmon	Mount Lemmon Survey	·	2.3 km	MPC · JPL
845996	2018 UD_{22}	—	October 17, 2018	Haleakala	Pan-STARRS 2	·	1.3 km	MPC · JPL
845997	2018 US_{27}	—	October 16, 2018	Haleakala	Pan-STARRS 2	THM	1.6 km	MPC · JPL
845998	2018 UV_{28}	—	October 17, 2018	Haleakala	Pan-STARRS 2	·	1.9 km	MPC · JPL
845999	2018 UW_{29}	—	October 20, 2018	Mount Lemmon	Mount Lemmon Survey	·	1.5 km	MPC · JPL
846000	2018 US_{31}	—	November 18, 2014	Haleakala	Pan-STARRS 1	·	810 m	MPC · JPL

back to top

== Meaning of names ==
As minor planet discoveries are confirmed, they are given a permanent number by the IAU's Minor Planet Center (MPC), and the discoverers can then submit names for them, following the IAU's naming conventions. The list below concerns those minor planets in the specified number-range that have received names, and explains the meanings of those names.

Official naming citations of newly named small Solar System bodies are approved and published in a bulletin by IAU's Working Group for Small Bodies Nomenclature (WGSBN). Before May 2021, citations were published in MPC's Minor Planet Circulars for many decades. Recent citations can also be found on the JPL Small-Body Database (SBDB). Until his death in 2016, German astronomer Lutz D. Schmadel compiled these citations into the Dictionary of Minor Planet Names (DMP) and regularly updated the collection.

Based on Paul Herget's The Names of the Minor Planets, Schmadel also researched the unclear origin of numerous asteroids, most of which had been named prior to World War II. This article incorporates text from this source, which is in the public domain: SBDB New namings may only be added to this list below after official publication as the preannouncement of names is condemned. The WGSBN publishes a comprehensive guideline for the naming rules of non-cometary small Solar System bodies.

Named minor planet	Provisional	This minor planet was named for...	Ref · Catalog
845241 Zentaalksne	2017 SQ_{228}	Zenta Alksne, Latvian astronomer	IAU · 845241
