= (845854) 2018 LF16 =

Mars-crossing asteroid

(845854) 2018 LF_{16}
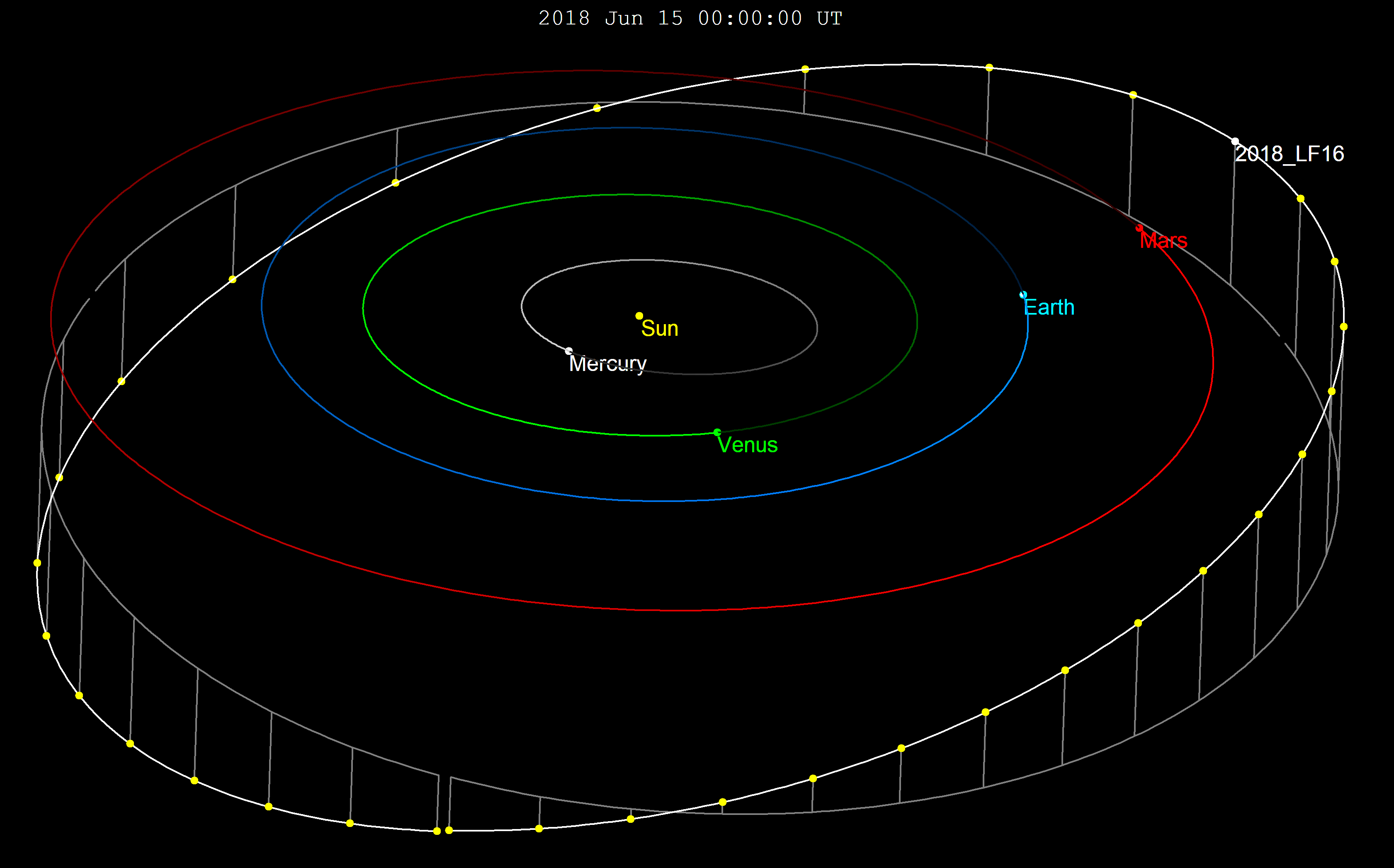
- The best inclined orbit is currently completely outside Earth's orbit, with markers every 30 days of motion.

Discovery
- Discovered by: Pan-STARRS 1
- Discovery site: Haleakala Obs.
- Discovery date: 14 June 2018

Designations
- Minor planet category: Mars crossing asteroid

Orbital characteristics
- Epoch 15 June 2018 (JD 2458284.5)
- Uncertainty parameter 0
- Observation arc: 15 years
- Aphelion: 1.968 AU (on 2023-Sep-16)
- Perihelion: 1.5673 AU
- Semi-major axis: 1.7679 AU
- Eccentricity: 0.11347
- Orbital period (sidereal): 2.35 yr (622 d)
- Mean anomaly: 10.87°
- Mean motion: 0° 22^{m} 24.96^{s} / day
- Inclination: 21.903°
- Longitude of ascending node: 210.28°
- Time of perihelion: 2022-Jul-14
- Argument of perihelion: 306.89°
- Earth MOID: 0.61 AU (91 million km)

Physical characteristics
- Mean diameter: 213 m 400 m 300-670 meters
- Absolute magnitude (H): 19.75

(845854) 2018 LF_{16} is a small Mars crossing asteroid roughly 213 m (699 ft) in diameter. It was first observed by astronomers with the Pan-STARRS survey at Haleakala Observatory on 14 June 2018. It was removed from the Sentry Risk Table on 29 July 2021. With an observation arc of 15 years the orbit is very well known and it does not make any notable approaches to Earth.

In November 2018, when the asteroid had an observation arc of 1.8 days, news article headlines exaggerated claims of 62 potentially dangerous Earth-orbit crossings in the next century but also reported NASA calculations indicating there was only a 1 in 30,000,000 chance of impact. Additionally, 2018 LF_{16} was rated at 0 on the Torino Scale, meaning that the chance of impact was so low as to effectively be zero. The observation arc extended only 1.8 days, leaving large uncertainties in its predicted motion, causing 2018 LF_{16} to be considered a lost asteroid.

Obsolete 2023 Virtual Impactor
Date	JPL Horizons nominal geocentric distance (AU)	uncertainty region (3-sigma)
2023-08-07	1.09977 AU (164.523 million km)	± 142 km

With an observation arc of 15 years, it is known that its orbit leaves it entirely outside of Earth's orbit, never coming closer than 0.61 AU (91 million km) to Earth (MOID). On 7 August 2023 the asteroid was roughly 1.1 AU (160 million km) from Earth with an uncertainty region of ±142 km. It reached aphelion (farthest point from the Sun) on 16 September 2023. It will pass 0.080 AU (12.0 million km) from Mars on 6 July 2027.
