= Eos (disambiguation) =

Eos is the goddess of the dawn in Greek mythology.

Eos or EOS may also refer to:

== Astronomy ==
- 221 Eos, an asteroid
- Eos cloud, a dark molecular cloud
- Eos Chasma, a depression on Mars
- Eos family, main-belt asteroids
- Earth Observing System, a NASA program

== Literature ==
- Eos (imprint), an imprint of HarperCollins Publishing
- Eos (magazine), a weekly publication of the American Geophysical Union
- Eos Press, an American card games and role-playing game publisher

== Music ==
- Eos (Terje Rypdal & David Darling album), 1984
- Eos (Eldritch album), 2021
- "E.O.S.", a 2004 trance music piece by Ronski Speed
- Echoes of Silence, a 2011 mixtape by the Weeknd
  - Echoes of Silence (song), the mixtape's title track
- "EOS", a 2017 song by Rostam from Half-Light
- Emperor of Sand, a 2017 record by Mastodon

== Places ==
- Eos Glacier, a glacier in Antarctica
- Mount Eos, a mountain in Antarctica

== Science ==
- Eos (bird), a genus of lories (parrots)
- Eos (protein), a photoactivatable fluorescent protein
- Eosinophil, a variety of white blood cell
- Esterified omega-hydroxyacyl-sphingosine, a human lipoxygenase
- Ethanolamine-O-sulfate, a chemical compound used in biochemical research
- European Optical Society
- IKZF4 or zinc finger protein Eos, a protein in humans
- Equation of state
- Economies of scale

== Technology ==
- EOS (medical imaging), a medical projection radiography system
- EOS.IO, a cryptocurrency
- Canon EOS, a series of film and digital cameras
- Electrical overstress, a type of electronic component failure
- EOS GmbH, a manufacturer of industrial 3D printers

=== Computing ===
- Cisco Eos, a software platform
- EOS (operating system), a supercomputer operating system in the 1980s
- EOS (8-bit operating system), a homecomputer operating system in the 1980s
- EOS memory, ECC on SIMMs, used in server-class computers
- Emulator Operating System, an operating system used in E-mu Emulator musical instruments
- Extensible Operating System, Arista Networks's single-network operating system
- Ethernet over SDH, a set of protocols for carrying Ethernet traffic
- /e/ (operating system), a free and open-source Android-based mobile operating system

== Transportation ==
- Eos (yacht), a yacht owned by Barry Diller
- Eos Airlines, a defunct airline
- Grif Eos, an Italian hang glider design
- Volkswagen Eos, a coupé convertible vehicle made by Volkswagen

== Video games ==
- E.O.S. or Earth Orbit Stations, a space station simulation by Electronic Arts
- Eos, a fictional world in Final Fantasy XV
- Eos, a fictional planet in Mass Effect: Andromeda
- Eos, a character in Red Faction
- Eos, a fictional planet in Star Wars: Starfighter
- Epic Online Services, an SDK for cross-platform play features

== Other uses ==
- EOS (company), an American skin care company
- EOS Group, a financial services company
- End-of-sale
- Liwathon E.O.S.
- Norwegian Parliamentary Intelligence Oversight Committee or EOS Committee
- Eos (painting), an 1895 painting by Evelyn De Morgan

== People with the given name ==
- Eos Counsell (born 1976), Welsh violinist
- Gaynor Rowlands or Eos Gwalia (1883–1906), English actress
- Eos Morlais (1841–1892), Welsh tenor

== See also ==
- Aeos (disambiguation)
- AOS (disambiguation)
- EO (disambiguation)
- OS (disambiguation)
