= AEO =

AEO may refer to:

- Adaptive Execution Office of DARPA (US military)
- Aioun el Atrouss Airport in Hodh El Gharbi Region, Mauritania (IATA airport code AEO)
- Alternative episcopal oversight, ecclesiastical systems through which certain churches are provided with a different bishop
- American Eagle Outfitters, an American clothing and accessories retailer
- Appearance event ordination, a dating system for land mammal fossils
- Authorized economic operator, a WCO standard to secure and facilitate global trade
- Answer engine optimization, a digital marketing practice aimed at improving content visibility in direct-answer and AI-generated search systems

== See also ==
- AO (disambiguation)
- EO (disambiguation)
- Aeos (disambiguation)
- AOE (disambiguation)
