= Aeos =

Aeos or Æos may refer to:

- Aeos, the mythological horse that drew the Sun Chariot with 3 other horses across the sky with the Greek god Helios, see Helios
- 3.67 m Advanced Electro Optical System Telescope (AEOS) at the Air Force Maui Optical and Supercomputing observatory
- Cummins Aeos, the "AEOS", an electric semi-truck tractor unit from Cummins

== See also ==
- AEO (disambiguation) for the singular of Aeos
- AOS (disambiguation)
- Eos (disambiguation)
