= 2017 BS5 =

Near-Earth asteroid

2017 BS_{5}
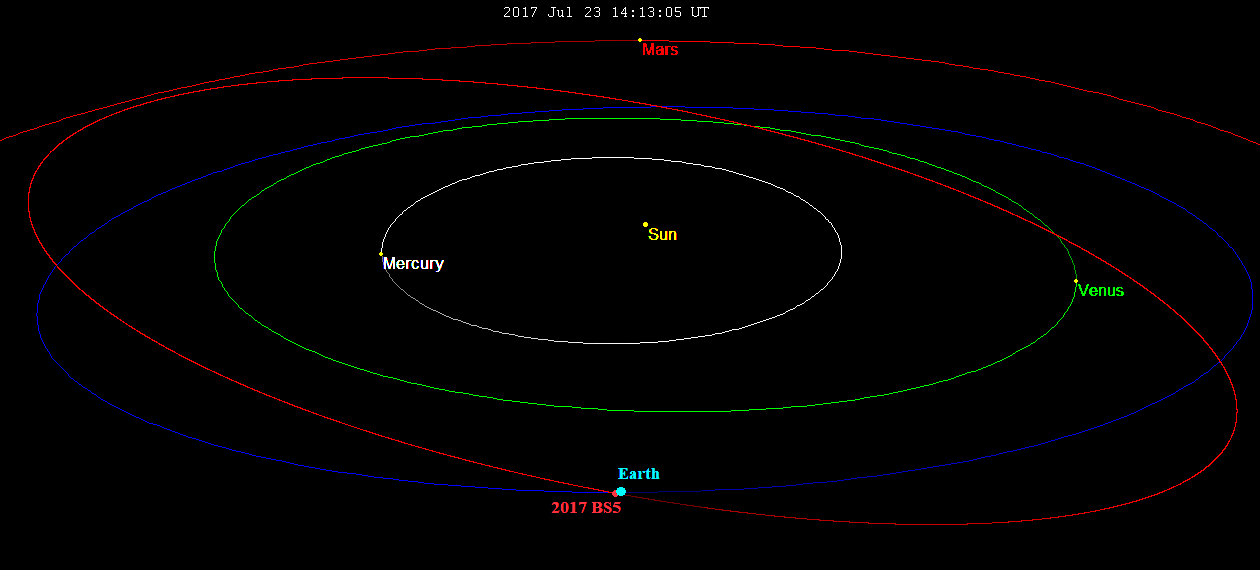
- July 23, 2017 flyby of Earth

Discovery
- Discovered by: ATLAS (T05)
- Discovery site: Haleakala Obs.
- Discovery date: 25 January 2017

Designations
- Minor planet category: Apollo · NEO

Orbital characteristics
- Epoch 4 September 2017 (JD 2458000.5)
- Uncertainty parameter 1
- Observation arc: (190 days)
- Aphelion: 1.0231 AU
- Perihelion: 1.0078 AU
- Semi-major axis: 1.0154 AU
- Eccentricity: 0.0075
- Orbital period (sidereal): 1.02 yr (374 days)
- Mean anomaly: 204.63°
- Mean motion: 0° 57^{m} 47.52^{s} / day
- Inclination: 11.232°
- Longitude of ascending node: 120.84°
- Argument of perihelion: 15.577°
- Earth MOID: 0.0070 AU · 2.7 LD

Physical characteristics
- Dimensions: 40–90 meters
- Absolute magnitude (H): 24.1

2017 BS_{5} is a sub-kilometer asteroid, classified as a near-Earth object that belongs to the Apollo group. It measures approximately 40–90 meters. During a close approach to Earth, it was first observed 25 January 2017, by the ATLAS survey at Haleakala Observatory, Hawaii, United States.

== Orbit ==
2017 BS_{5} has a low-eccentricity orbit with a semi-major axis only slightly larger than that of Earth. It orbits the Sun at a distance of 1.008–1.023 AU once every 1.02 years (374 days). Its orbit has an eccentricity of 0.01 and an inclination of 11° with respect to the ecliptic. It has an Earth minimum orbital intersection distance of 0.007 AU (1,050,000 km), which corresponds to 2.7 lunar distances. The body is too small to be classified as a potentially hazardous asteroid.

=== July 2017 flyby ===
On 23 July 2017, it passed by within 3.15 lunar distances. Seen from the Earth it passed straight north to south from Draco south into Scorpio. With its 1.023 year orbit it has a synodic period of 43 years with the Earth, so it will flyby the Earth every 43 years or so. JPL Small-Body Database's simulator show the previous flyby in July 1973 and next one will be in July 2061.

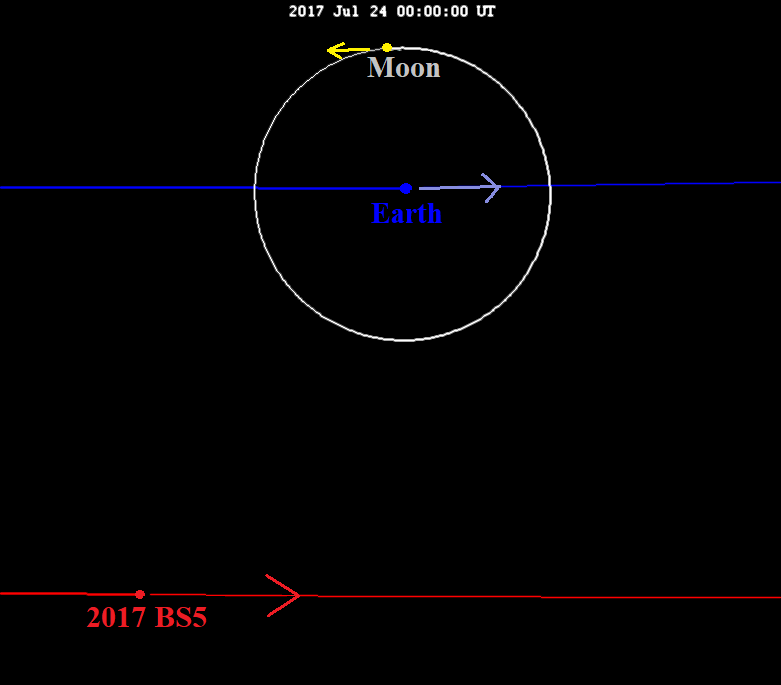
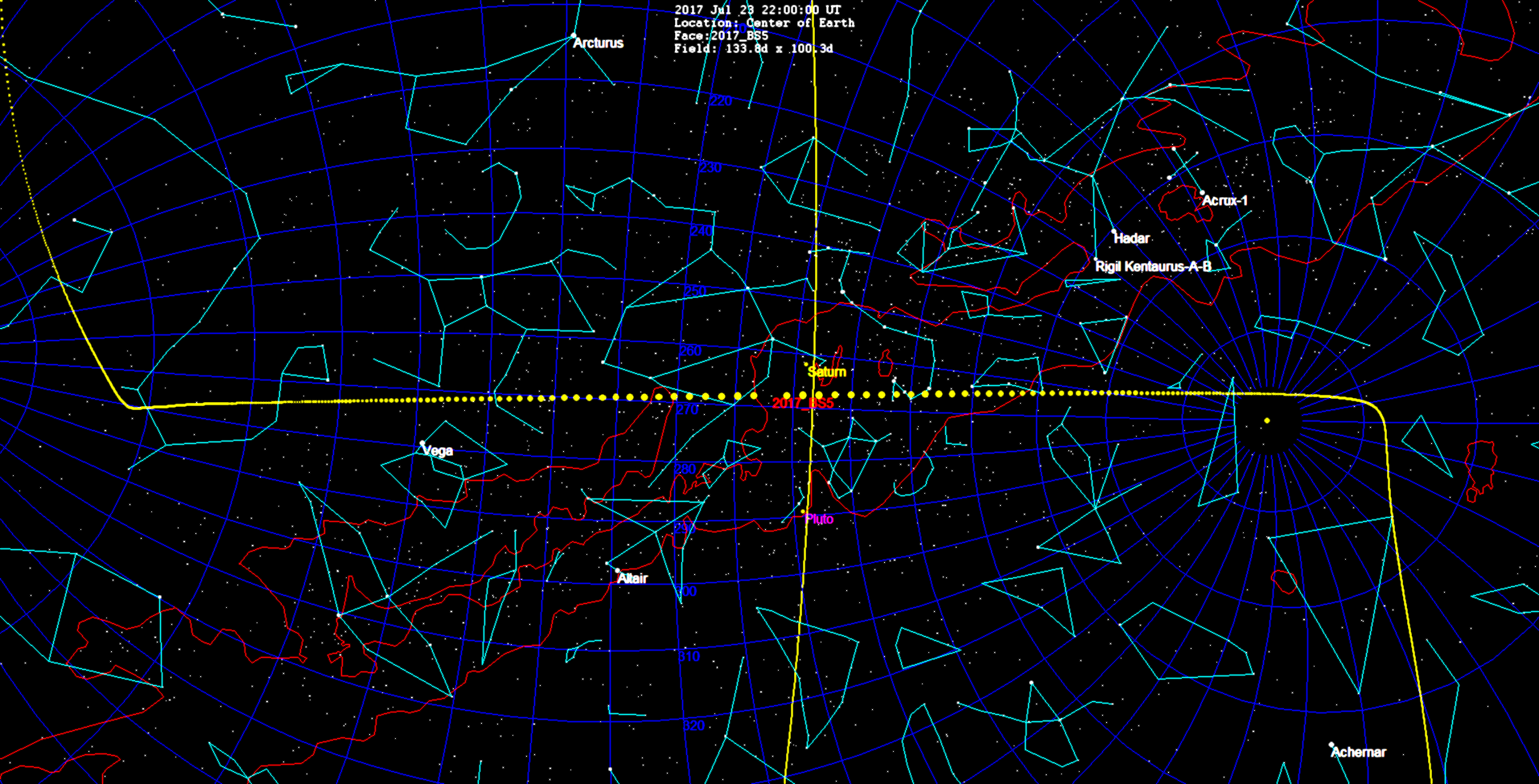
