= 15th Space Surveillance Squadron =

U.S. Space Force unit

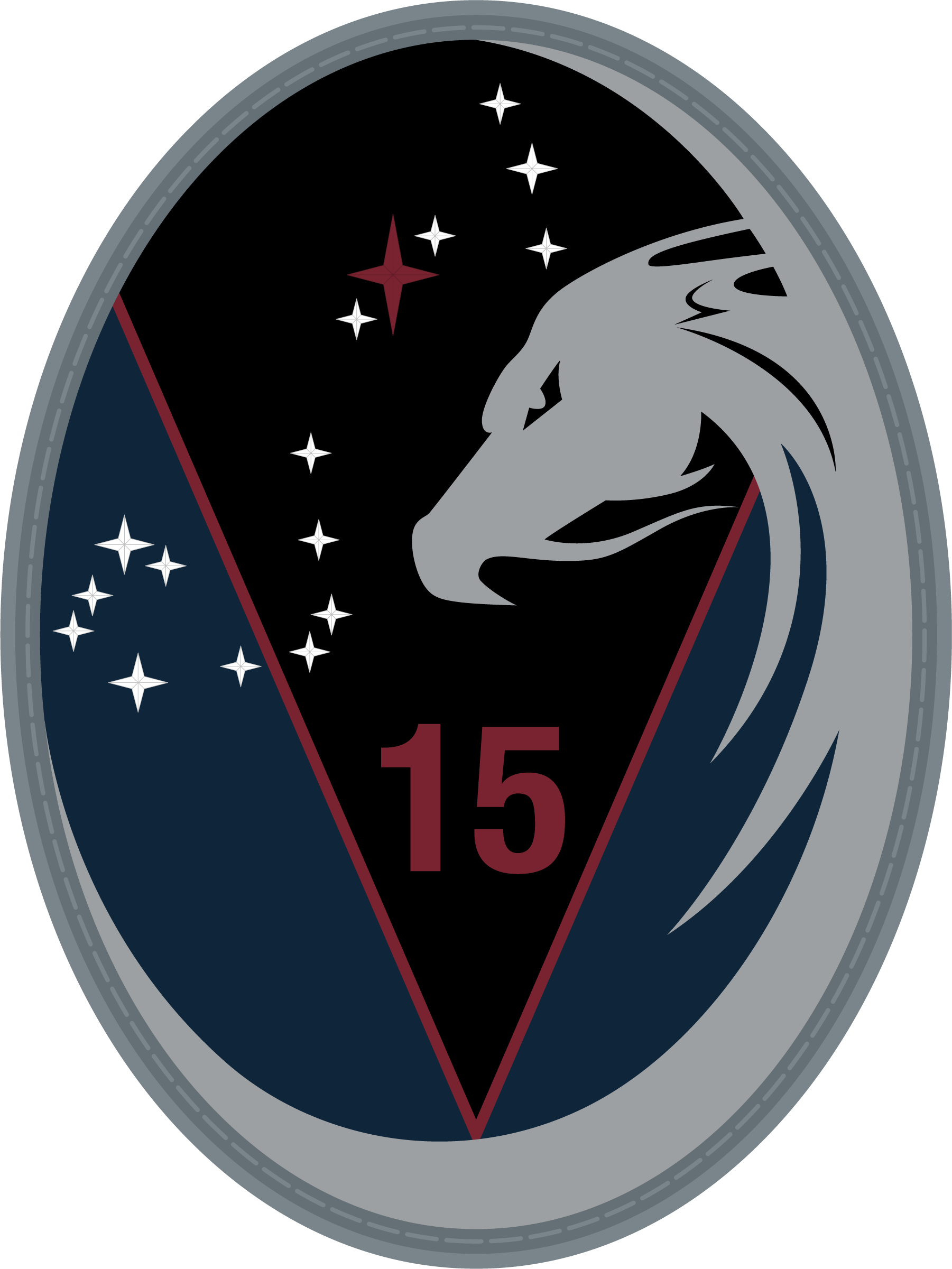
- 15 SPSS emblem
- Active: 26 May 2022–present
- Country: United States
- Branch: United States Space Force
- Type: Squadron
- Role: Space domain awareness
- Part of: Space Delta 2
- Headquarters: Haleakala Observatory, Maui, Hawaii, U.S.

Commanders
- Commander: Lt Col Douglas Thornton
- Senior Enlisted Leader: SMSgt Matt Glenn

The 15th Space Surveillance Squadron (15 SPSS) is a United States Space Force unit responsible for operating the Maui Space Surveillance Complex in Hawaii. It is a part of Space Delta 2.

== Origins and initial establishment ==
The Maui Space Surveillance Complex (MSSC) traces its roots to the early days of the Space Age. In 1958, a Baker-Nunn tracking camera was installed on Haleakalā as part of Project Space Track, making Haleakalā one of the first sites for optical satellite tracking . This gave the U.S. Air Force a presence on Maui to observe the trajectories of Earth-orbiting objects. Building on this foundation, the Advanced Research Projects Agency (ARPA) selected the 10,000-foot summit of Haleakalā for an ambitious optical tracking station in the 1960s, recognizing the mountain’s clear, stable atmosphere and high elevation as ideal for long-range imaging.

By August 1966, the ARPA Midcourse Optical Station (AMOS) atop Haleakalā became operational . The initial mission of AMOS was to collect optical measurements of intercontinental ballistic missile (ICBM) tests—specifically tracking missiles launched from Vandenberg AFB in California toward targets near the Kwajalein Atoll . At the time of its opening, AMOS featured a 1.6-meter telescope, which was among the world’s ten largest astronomical telescopes of the era . The University of Michigan (under contract to ARPA) assisted in early operations and maintenance, and a cadre of about 40 scientists, engineers, and technicians regularly traveled up the mountain to support the facility . In these early years, the site’s focus expanded from purely missile-tracking to include space surveillance of satellites, laying the groundwork for its dual role in missile test support and orbital object tracking . By the late 1960s, additional instruments were added: twin 1.2-meter telescopes and the full operational use of the 1.6-meter telescope for both missile and satellite observations . ARPA’s initiative thus firmly established MSSC (then known as AMOS) as a pioneering optical surveillance outpost during the Cold War.

== Major milestones and technological advancements ==
Throughout its history, the MSSC (AMOS) has undergone numerous upgrades and pivotal developments. In the 1970s, management of the site transitioned – the Air Force and its contractors (Avco Everett Research Lab and later Lockheed) took on larger roles, and in 1977 the site was officially renamed the Air Force Maui Optical Station as operational control shifted to the U.S. Air Force’s Strategic Air Command . This period saw the introduction of cutting-edge technologies. Notably, in 1975 a 0.6-meter Laser Beam Director telescope was installed, enabling the projection of laser beams for tracking and illumination purposes . By 1977, MSSC hosted one of the world’s first operational adaptive optics systems: an experimental silicon-on-insulator adaptive imaging system fielded in collaboration with the Air Force’s Rome Air Development Center . Shortly thereafter, in 1978, the complex achieved routine adaptive-optics corrected imaging on its 1.6-meter telescope – a landmark that dramatically improved image clarity for space surveillance, and one of the earliest such operational uses of adaptive optics anywhere .

Another major milestone was the establishment of the Ground-based Electro-Optical Deep Space Surveillance (GEODSS) system at MSSC. Construction for GEODSS at Haleakalā began around 1980, adding three new domes and support facilities on site . GEODSS achieved initial operational capability in 1982, becoming one of only three operational sites globally performing ground-based optical tracking of deep-space objects . This greatly enhanced the Air Force’s ability to track dim objects in high orbits; at IOC, the Maui GEODSS could image satellites down to approximately 19th magnitude and became an integral part of the Space Surveillance Network . The 1980s also saw MSSC participate in critical national security experiments. For example, the site supported the Homing Overlay Experiment (an early anti-ballistic missile test) by acquiring and tracking a reentry vehicle intercept in 1984, and it demonstrated high-resolution imaging that solved anomalies on a Defense Meteorological Satellite Program spacecraft in 1985 . During this era, the Air Force, NASA, and other agencies increasingly leveraged MSSC’s capabilities for “space situational awareness” research, including tests of laser propagation and atmospheric compensation that would pave the way for modern adaptive optics techniques .

A transformative technological advancement was the addition of the Advanced Electro-Optical System (AEOS) telescope in the 1990s. Spearheaded by funding from the Strategic Defense Initiative Organization and championed by Congressional support in the late 1980s, AEOS was envisioned as a 3.67-meter (144-inch) aperture telescope with state-of-the-art optics and instrumentation . AEOS construction was completed in the mid-90s, and by 1997 it attained first light, capturing images (such as the Ring Nebula) that demonstrated its high image quality . This made AEOS the largest optical telescope in the Department of Defense. In fact, at 3.6–3.7 meters in diameter, AEOS is the DoD’s largest optical telescope designed for tracking and imaging satellites . After its debut, a $40 million advanced adaptive optics system was integrated into AEOS by 1999, further enhancing its ability to resolve details of objects in orbit . Also in 1993, the Maui High Performance Computing Center (MHPCC) was established down in Kihei, Maui, bringing a supercomputing resource to complement the summit’s sensors . The opening of MHPCC led to the renaming of the overall site as the “Air Force Maui Optical and Supercomputing Site (AMOS)” in 1993 . High-speed networks were put in place to connect the mountain-top observatory with the computing center, enabling rapid processing of imagery and data . Through the 2000s and 2010s, MSSC continued to innovate: it hosted NASA’s Near-Earth Asteroid Tracking (NEAT) camera on a 1.2 m telescope (2000–2007) to discover and monitor asteroids, upgraded sensors and software for ever-fainter object detection, and most recently in 2017 added a new sodium laser guidestar system to improve adaptive optics for space imaging . Each milestone added to MSSC’s capabilities, keeping it at the forefront of electro-optical surveillance technology.

== Role in national security and space domain awareness ==
From the Cold War to the present, the MSSC has played a pivotal role in U.S. national security as a key asset for Space Domain Awareness (SDA). Perched high atop Haleakalā, the complex provides an unobstructed view of the sky and serves as a “strategically-located national asset” for tracking man-made objects in space . Its optical systems have been integrated into the U.S. Space Surveillance Network, contributing to the continuous cataloging and monitoring of satellites and orbital debris. During the 1960s–80s, MSSC (under its former name AMOS) was instrumental in monitoring missile tests and satellites of interest, essentially functioning as a remote “eye” that could image and assess objects that radar systems of the time might not resolve. As space became a contested domain, the complex’s ability to optically track and identify satellites grew in importance – for example, providing data on foreign satellite deployments, characterizing new spacecraft, or detecting anomalies in U.S. assets. By the 21st century, this mission set evolved into what is now called Space Domain Awareness.

Today, MSSC’s mission is directly tied to the U.S. Space Force’s mandate to maintain awareness of all activities in orbit. The 15th Space Surveillance Squadron (15 SPSS), activated in 2022, operates the MSSC as part of Space Force’s Space Delta 2, focusing on space surveillance operations . The MSSC’s telescopes furnish both near-Earth and deep-space tracking – meaning they can follow satellites in low Earth orbit as well as in geosynchronous orbits thousands of kilometers away . This optical tracking is complementary to radar sensors, offering higher resolution images and the ability to observe objects at great distances (such as detecting satellites at geostationary altitude or beyond). Data from MSSC supports the U.S. military’s satellite catalog, collision avoidance predictions, and threat assessments. In practical terms, MSSC contributes to detecting satellite maneuvers, identifying new launches or breakup events, and tracking space debris that could threaten critical assets . The site has also been called upon for important one-time missions – for instance, helping characterize the aftermath of anti-satellite tests or observing foreign missile re-entry vehicles from a unique vantage point in the Pacific. Because of its advanced imaging capabilities, MSSC can perform space object identification, capturing details of satellites (such as size, shape, or rotation) that are vital for intelligence and verification of treaty compliance . In summary, MSSC significantly enhances the U.S. ability to “see” into space. Military officials emphasize that as the number of objects in orbit grows, sensors like those on Haleakalā are essential for preventing collisions and monitoring behavior in space . The complex thereby stands as a first line of defense in the space domain, contributing to the safety and security of both national security satellites and the overall space environment.

== Key facilities and capabilities (telescopes and adaptive optics) ==
The MSSC encompasses a suite of specialized telescopes and instrumentation, each contributing to its overall mission. The complex is part of the larger Haleakalā Observatory and is operated by the Air Force Research Laboratory (AFRL) on land leased from the University of Hawaiʻi . Within MSSC, the original cluster of telescopes is often referred to as the Maui Space Surveillance System (MSSS), and it includes a variety of optical sensors. According to the University of Hawaiʻi’s Institute for Astronomy, MSSS utilizes a 1.6 m telescope, two 1.2 m telescopes on a common mount, a 0.8 m beam director/tracker, and a 0.6 m laser beam director . These instruments, some dating back to the 1960s–70s and since upgraded, are used for tracking satellites and performing research experiments (such as the early adaptive optics and laser tests). The twin 1.2 m telescopes, for example, were incorporated into the Air Force’s deep-space tracking network by the late 1970s under the Maui Optical Tracking and Identification Facility (MOTIF) program . They have provided stereo observations and infrared signatures of satellites . The 1.6 m telescope has long served as a workhorse for both optical surveillance and research; notably, it was the platform for the first operational adaptive optics system (the Compensated Imaging System) in the early 1980s . The GEODSS facility at MSSC consists of three telescopes dedicated to wide-field scanning of deep space: two with 1.0 m aperture and one smaller 0.38 m telescope . Housed in separate domes adjacent to MSSS, the Maui GEODSS telescopes repetitively survey the night sky, detecting faint moving objects against the star background. Each GEODSS telescope uses sensitive CCD cameras and can track objects the size of a basketball at distances of 20,000 miles or more from Earth . Data from Maui’s GEODSS is combined with that from sister sites in Socorro, New Mexico and Diego Garcia in the Indian Ocean, together providing round-the-clock deep-space surveillance. In sum, the MSSC hosts small, medium, and large-aperture tracking optics, covering a spectrum of observational needs from wide-area search to high-resolution imaging .

Inside the AEOS telescope dome at MSSC: the 3.67 m Advanced Electro-Optical System, DoD’s largest optical tracking telescope, with its dome open to a starry sky. The AEOS telescope’s adaptive optics and suite of sensors allow it to capture detailed images of satellites in orbit .

Towering above the other domes is the Advanced Electro-Optical System (AEOS) telescope, the crown jewel of MSSC’s capabilities. AEOS is a 3.67 m (144-inch) diameter telescope with a Ritchey-Chrétien optical design, housed in a large cylindrical enclosure visible on the Haleakalā summit . First operational in 1997, AEOS was built to provide the highest-resolution imagery of objects in Earth orbit for the U.S. Air Force . Uniquely, AEOS was designed as a multi-purpose instrument: its light can be directed by a series of mirrors into up to seven independent laboratory stations below the telescope . This allows multiple experiments or surveillance tasks to be carried out simultaneously – for instance, one station may feed a high-speed tracking camera, another an infrared spectrograph, and another an adaptive optics wavefront sensor. AEOS’s instrumentation includes an advanced adaptive optics system (to correct for atmospheric turbulence in real time), a low-light visible imager, long-wave infrared (LWIR) sensors, spectrographs, and radiometers . With these tools, AEOS can track fast-moving satellites in low Earth orbit or focus on distant geostationary satellites, providing data for space object identification. It routinely produces near-real-time images of satellites, and historically has even been used to image the Space Shuttle and International Space Station during missions. AEOS’s large aperture and adaptive optics also make it a valuable research telescope; scientists have used it to study astronomical targets (e.g. probing the atmosphere of Titan, a moon of Saturn) and to test imaging techniques that benefit both astronomy and defense. Overall, the combination of AEOS and the other MSSC telescopes gives the complex a versatile range of capabilities – from wide-field survey and detection to narrow-field, high-resolution inspection – across visible and infrared wavelengths . This sensor array, coupled with precision mount control and sensitive detectors, enables MSSC to collect imagery and signature data on space objects that would be impossible to obtain from lower-altitude sites or with smaller instruments.

== Integration of laser and high-performance computing technologies ==
One of the defining features of MSSC over the years has been its integration of advanced laser systems and on-site high-performance computing to augment observational capabilities. The use of lasers at Haleakalā began early: in 1974, the University of Hawaiʻi built the Lunar Ranging Experiment (LURE) Observatory at the MSSC site, which employed a powerful pulsed laser to range off reflector arrays left on the Moon by Apollo astronauts and Soviet landers . The LURE experiment measured the Earth-Moon distance with unprecedented precision (on the order of centimeters), demonstrating the value of lasers for extremely precise tracking. Building on this, MSSC later incorporated lasers to aid in satellite tracking and imaging. The 0.6 m Laser Beam Director added in 1975 was initially used to project laser light at orbital targets, likely to illuminate or pinpoint them for the optical sensors . In the 1980s, the complex participated in experiments like the Atmospheric Compensation Experiments (ACE), where laser beams were propagated horizontally and vertically to study how turbulence affects them – foundational research for adaptive optics and laser communications .

A major leap came with the installation of a Sodium Laser Guide Star (NaGS) system in 2017 as part of a modernization effort. This system fires a laser beam (at the 589 nm sodium wavelength) into the upper atmosphere to create an artificial star by exciting sodium atoms in the mesosphere . The glowing spot serves as a reference point for adaptive optics, allowing real-time correction of atmospheric distortion even when observing faint or dim satellites (which themselves might not provide a strong reference). The new sodium guide star produces a bright orange beam visible in the night sky above Haleakalā . Previously, MSSC had used visible lasers of other colors (like green or blue) for tracking and AO experiments, but the sodium line laser offers a standard approach in line with other major observatories. All laser activities are carefully managed to avoid interference with aircraft or the public; MSSC coordinates laser firings with the FAA, and the beams are generally not visible beyond the summit area . Thanks to these laser systems, MSSC can perform active illumination of objects (important for low-light imaging) and achieve sharper images through wavefront correction – essentially “clearing the blur” caused by Earth’s atmosphere. This integration of laser technology underscores MSSC’s status as a cutting-edge site for electro-optical innovation, marrying directed energy techniques with telescopic surveillance.

Another critical component is the high-performance computing integrated into MSSC operations. Recognizing that capturing images is only half the battle – the data must be processed and analyzed – the Department of Defense established the Maui High Performance Computing Center in 1993 as part of the AMOS site . The MHPCC, located in Kihei, Maui, is one of five DoD Supercomputing Resource Centers and was connected to the summit facility by high-speed communications links . This allowed large volumes of imagery and sensor data from MSSC’s telescopes to be sent almost instantly to powerful computers for processing. In the 1990s, MHPCC’s machines (such as early IBM SP systems, including an installation of IBM’s “Deep Blue” RS/6000 in 1999) were among the fastest in the world . They enabled advanced image processing algorithms – for example, reconstructing high-resolution images from speckled, turbulence-distorted frames, or running orbital models to correlate observations with known objects. Researchers at MSSC developed techniques for automated detection and identification of satellites, using the HPC resources to run simulations and analyze signature databases . The integration of computing also meant MSSC could support near-real-time operations: an image taken by AEOS could be processed through an adaptive optics reconstruction and have an identifiable picture of a satellite within minutes, useful for time-sensitive space situational awareness needs. Over time, the HPC capability has continuously evolved – new supercomputers at MHPCC keep pace with increasing data volumes and more sophisticated algorithms (including today’s machine learning approaches for object recognition). The symbiosis between MSSC’s “optic” side and the “supercomputing” side is such a hallmark that the name AMOS (Optical and Supercomputing) reflects this partnership. Together, lasers and HPC have amplified MSSC’s effectiveness: lasers improve what the telescopes can see, and HPC ensures that what is seen can be quickly understood and utilized.

== Collaborations with DoD, U.S. Space Force, and research institutions ==
The Maui Space Surveillance Complex has always been a collaborative endeavor, bringing together military, civilian agencies, academia, and industry in pursuit of enhanced space surveillance. From its inception, Department of Defense agencies have played central roles. ARPA (now DARPA) was the driving force in establishing the original station in the 1960s, funding its construction and early operations . The Air Force, as ARPA’s field agent, gradually took over operations (through entities like Air Force Systems Command and later Air Force Space Command), and by the 1980s the Air Force was fully in charge of MSSC’s missions . The Air Force Research Laboratory (AFRL), particularly its Directed Energy Directorate, operates the site today, focusing on R&D of SDA technologies. At the same time, the operational mission is carried out by the US Space Force’s 15th Space Surveillance Squadron, reflecting a tight partnership: Space Force personnel and AFRL scientists work side by side at MSSC . This fusion of operational and research elements is somewhat unique – as noted, 15 SPSS is a blended unit with both Space Operations Command and AFRL personnel, creating a “center of excellence” for space domain awareness innovation . The result is that experimental systems developed by AFRL can be tested and used in real space surveillance operations at the site, accelerating the transition of new technology into the hands of warfighters.

Collaboration extends to other parts of the DoD and government. The U.S. Army and Navy have periodically been involved when their interests intersect (for instance, the Army provided a large telescope mirror blank that was repurposed for AEOS’s mirror, and the Navy has an interest in monitoring geosynchronous satellites which MSSC can assist with). NASA has been a key collaborator as well. The NASA Orbital Debris Program has utilized MSSC data to study space debris populations, and a NASA-provided camera (the Orbital Debris “Meter-Class Autonomous Telescope”, MCAT) was at one point tested on Maui before being deployed elsewhere . Historically, NASA and the Air Force cooperated during the Apollo era through the LURE lunar laser ranging program, and more recently NASA’s Jet Propulsion Laboratory and the University of Arizona operated the NEAT asteroid survey using MSSC’s telescopes . Academic institutions have a long history on Haleakalā. The University of Hawaiʻi’s Institute for Astronomy not only co-manages the summit for scientific use but directly contributed to MSSC’s development (e.g. UH built and ran the LURE Observatory ). UH continues to partner through contracts for maintaining certain systems and through data-sharing agreements. Other universities such as MIT (through Lincoln Laboratory) and the University of New Mexico have sent researchers and experiments to MSSC; the site’s Visiting Experimenter Program, formalized in 1975, opened the door for outside scientists to run experiments using the telescopes . This program fostered a stream of collaborative research, from testing new sensors to gathering astronomical observations. For example, a visiting astronomy team in 2001 used MSSC’s telescopes to study the atmosphere of Saturn’s moon Titan, taking advantage of the site’s infrared instruments .

On the industry front, aerospace contractors have been deeply involved in MSSC. Lockheed Martin (and its predecessors) operated the site under contract for decades starting in the late 1960s . Companies like Avco Everett Research Laboratory, Boeing, and BAE Systems have contributed technology and support – Boeing recently led the effort to recoat the AEOS telescope’s primary mirror, highlighting industry’s role in sustaining MSSC’s advanced equipment . Additionally, each year, Maui hosts the AMOS Conference, a gathering of military, industry, and academic experts in space surveillance. While not an operational aspect, this conference (sponsored by AFRL and others) is a product of MSSC’s legacy, driving further collaboration and idea exchange in the community. In sum, MSSC stands as a collaborative hub: DoD organizations provide the mission and funding, the Space Force and AFRL provide staffing and expertise, academia provides innovation and additional uses, and industry provides technology and support services. This collaboration has ensured MSSC remains at the cutting edge while serving a broad array of stakeholders in the space surveillance realm.

== Current operational significance and future developments ==
Today, the Maui Space Surveillance Complex remains indispensable to U.S. space operations, and plans are underway to further enhance its capabilities for the future. Under the aegis of the U.S. Space Force, MSSC’s current operations are a blend of 24/7 monitoring and experimental testing. The 15 SPSS continues to perform real-time space surveillance—tracking thousands of objects, updating orbital catalogs, and providing early warning of potential satellite collisions or maneuvers. Because of its geographical location in the mid-Pacific, MSSC offers coverage of orbital paths that nicely complement other Space Force sensors; it can observe satellites over the Pacific and Asia that might be in daylight or low on the horizon from mainland U.S. sites. This makes it strategically valuable for global Space Domain Awareness coverage. Moreover, the integration of AFRL means that whenever new sensor techniques or algorithms are developed, they can be rolled into operations at MSSC quickly. For example, if AFRL develops a machine-learning technique to better identify satellite shapes from telescope images, the MSSC team can test and use it directly during live operations. This synergy of operations and R&D keeps the complex’s performance improving continuously. In the broader Space Force sensor network, MSSC is regarded as a critical asset for deep-space tracking – its data is fed to the Combined Space Operations Center (CSpOC) and used in conjunction with radar and other optical data to maintain the master catalog of space objects.

Looking to the future, there are significant developments on the horizon for MSSC. The Air Force (and now Space Force) have proposed the AMOS Strategic Telescope Advancement and Research (STAR) project, which would expand the site with up to seven new small telescopes and an advanced optics lab . These additional telescopes, if built, would be housed in new domes on Haleakalā and operated remotely from the existing MSSC control room . The goal of AMOS STAR is to increase the capacity for tracking the ever-growing population of satellites and debris – essentially multiplying how many areas of the sky MSSC can monitor at once. The need for such expansion is driven by the rapid increase in objects in orbit (from mega-constellations of small satellites to fragmentation debris), which in turn requires more telescopes to “more frequently track the objects in space” and avoid coverage gaps . Environmental and cultural impact assessments are in progress for this project, as the summit of Haleakalā is revered in Native Hawaiian culture and already home to many observatories, which has led to community concerns about further development . The Space Force is working through environmental impact studies and community engagement as it plans these upgrades, emphasizing that enhanced space surveillance is necessary for national security.

In addition to new telescopes, MSSC’s existing infrastructure is slated for improvements. Plans have been noted for building a mirror re-coating facility on-site (so that large telescope mirrors like AEOS’s can be serviced without having to be shipped to the mainland) . Upgrades to communications (such as even faster fiber links) are likely as data rates increase. The computing side (MHPCC) continues to receive new supercomputing hardware, which will eventually enable real-time or near-real-time data processing for all sensors, even as data volumes climb. There is also interest in leveraging MSSC for space object custody and characterization in the era of Space Force: this could involve integrating artificial intelligence to automatically classify observed objects or predict their behaviors, using the rich dataset MSSC provides. As space becomes more congested and contested, MSSC’s role could expand to supporting active satellite defense measures – for instance, providing targeting-quality tracking for any future space traffic management or defensive systems.

In summary, the Maui Space Surveillance Complex remains a cornerstone of space domain awareness, with a rich history and a dynamic future. Its unique combination of location, advanced telescopes, lasers, and computing make it an irreplaceable asset for both the scientific and defense communities. From humble beginnings with a single tracking camera, MSSC has evolved into a modern sensor fusion hub that not only watches over Earth’s orbit for the U.S. Space Force, but also drives technological progress in how we observe and understand objects in space. With ongoing innovations and planned expansions like the AMOS STAR initiative, MSSC is poised to continue its legacy of excellence in space surveillance for decades to come, ensuring that the United States and its partners can operate safely and confidently in the final frontier. .

== List of commanders ==
- Lt Col Phillip Wagenbach, 6 April 2022 – present

== See also ==
- Space Delta 2
