= AOE =

AOE, aoe, or AoE may refer to:

== Art and entertainment ==
- Area of effect, a video game term
- Age of Empires, a real-time strategy video game series
- Transformers: Age of Extinction, a 2014 film by Michael
- Amusement Operators Expo, former name of the Amusement Expo trade show

== Organizations ==
- Assembly of Experts, an Iranian governmental body
- Alpha Omega Epsilon, a social and professional sorority for women in engineering and technical sciences

== Science and technology ==
- ATA over Ethernet (AoE), a lightweight storage area network protocol
- Audio over Ethernet (AoE), the use of an Ethernet-based network to distribute real-time digital audio
- Acute otitis externa, an infection of the external ear canal

== Transport ==
- Airport of entry, an airport that provides customs and immigration services
- American Orient Express
- Fast combat support ship (US Navy hull classification symbol: AOE); see List of United States Navy oilers
- Automatic train operation over European Train Control System; see European Train Control System

== Other uses ==
- Alberta Order of Excellence, a high notary award given in Alberta, Canada
- Anywhere on Earth (AoE), a calendar designation for UTC−12:00
- "Axis of evil", a term used by former U.S. President George W. Bush in his 2002 State of the Union address
- Western Sahara (ITU letter code: AOE), a disputed territory on the northwest coast of Africa
- Angal Enen language, an ISO 639-3 code

== See also ==
- AEO (disambiguation)
