= AOS =

AOS, Aos or AoS may refer to:

== Military, police and government ==
- Armed Offenders Squad, a branch of the New Zealand Police
- Armed Offenders Squad (Victoria), a disbanded branch of the Victorian Police in Australia
- Amook Bay Seaplane Base (IATA code AOS)
- Adjustment of status, an immigration concept in the United States

== Schools and education ==
- Academy of the Sierras, boarding schools devoted to weight loss
- The Alice Ottley School, Worcester, England
- AO Springfield School, Worcester, England
- Associate of Occupational Studies, a two-year college degree
- Annunciation Orthodox School, a Greek Orthodox private school in Houston, Texas
- Loudoun Academy of Science, a high school STEM program in Loudoun County, Virginia

== Science and academia ==
- Accessory olfactory system, a second sense of smell in some animals
- Accounting, Organizations and Society, an academic journal
- Acquisition of signal, in spacecraft communications
- Agricultural Ontology Service
- α-Olefin sulfonate, a surfactant
- American Oriental Society, a learned society
- American Ornithological Society
- Angle of sideslip
- Apraxia of speech, a speech sound disorder
- Area of Search, a geographical region used in the selection of Sites of Special Scientific Interest in the UK
- Adams–Oliver syndrome, a congenital disorder

== Popular culture ==
- Agents of S.H.I.E.L.D., an American television series set in the Marvel Cinematic Universe
- Ace of Spades (video game)
- Ace of Spades HQ, a political blog
- Aeon of Strife, an early multiplayer online battle arena (MOBA)
- Age of Sail (computer game)
  - Age of Sail II, its sequel
- Castlevania: Aria of Sorrow, a game for the Game Boy Advance
- "AOS" (song), 1970, by Yoko Ono, featuring Ornette Coleman
- All-Out Sundays, a Philippine GMA Network Sunday variety show
- Warhammer Age of Sigmar, a tabletop wargame

== Technology ==
- Academic Operating System, a version of 4.3 BSD Unix for the IBM RT
- Algebraic operating system, an input method used on many Texas Instruments calculators
- AmigaOS
- Apple Online Store, the retail web site for Apple Inc.
- Array of structures, an interleaved data format
- Data General AOS (Advanced Operating System)
- A2, an operating system formerly named Active Object System (AOS)
- Fedora AOS (Appliance Operating System), a small version of the Fedora Linux project
- aos or AOS, acronym of "anonymous operating system", an earlier name for the operating system Whonix

== People ==
- Austin Osman Spare (1886–1956), English occultist and artist

== See also ==
- AO (disambiguation)
- OS (disambiguation)
- ADOS (disambiguation)
- Aeos (disambiguation)
- EOS (disambiguation)
- AOZ (disambiguation)
