= Dogwoof =

British film-distribution company

- Type: Private
- Industry: Motion pictures, television
- Founded: London, England (2003)
- Headquarters: London, England
- Key people: Andy Whittaker (Founder); Anna Godas (CEO); Oli Harbottle (Head of Distribution & Acquisitions); Ana Vicente (Head of Sales)
- Products: Dogwoof Releases; Dogwoof Sales; TDog Productions
- Website: dogwoof.com dogwoofsales.com

Dogwoof is a film-distribution company based in the United Kingdom.

== History ==
=== Dogwoof Pictures ===
Dogwoof was founded in 2003 by Andy Whittaker, and originally concentrated on foreign films, including such titles as Don't Move, Fateless, El Lobo, and Esma's Secret. They have distributed documentaries such as Black Gold, Crude Awakening, and The Devil Came On Horseback.

In July 2005, the company experimented by distributing James Erskine's EMR simultaneously in cinemas, on the internet through Tiscali (ISP), and on DVD through its Home Entertainment division. The move was notable since most films are released through different distribution channels on a staggered schedule, giving each channel an exclusive release window. Exhibitors were especially wary, as many feared that they would eventually lose their exclusive release windows for more mainstream films.

In 2005 Dogwoof launched the UK Digital Screen Network DSN at the Curzon Soho cinema. Political thriller King's Game was shown from a digital print as opposed to 35mm at the Curzon Soho cinema in London at a commercial matinee performance. The cinema installed the digital projector as part of the Phase 1 roll-out of the UK Film Council Digital Screen Network.

In 2009 Dogwoof distributed the documentary The Age of Stupid, The End of the Line, Burma VJ, We Live in Public and Afghan Star.

In 2010 Dogwoof announced a deal with technology company Cisco to build social media websites using the Cisco Eos platform for each film release. Dogwoof was the first European customer for Cisco Eos. The first website launched was Good with Film.

=== Dogwoof Sales ===
In 2011 Dogwoof launched Dogwoof Sales, the international sales arm of Dogwoof Ltd, that has established itself as a sales agents for documentaries like Blackfish, Dior and I, Weiner and Cartel Land.

=== TDog Productions ===
TDog is Dogwoof's invite-only production fund. The fund launched in 2016 in order to support the making of documentaries across the world.
