= Andy Whittaker =

Paul Andrew Whittaker (born January 1967) is the founder of the British film distributor Dogwoof, which focuses on films about social issues and documentaries, such as Food, Inc. and Burma VJ.

On 24 September 2010, The Guardian published a one-off Film Power 100 list, on which Whittaker was ranked the 86th most influential figure on British cinema audiences.

In 2015 he was included in the Evening Standard Progress 1000 list, for 'London's most influential people 2015 - Film'.
