= Maui Space Surveillance Complex =

Observatory in Hawaii

Minor planets discovered: 67
see § List of discovered minor planets

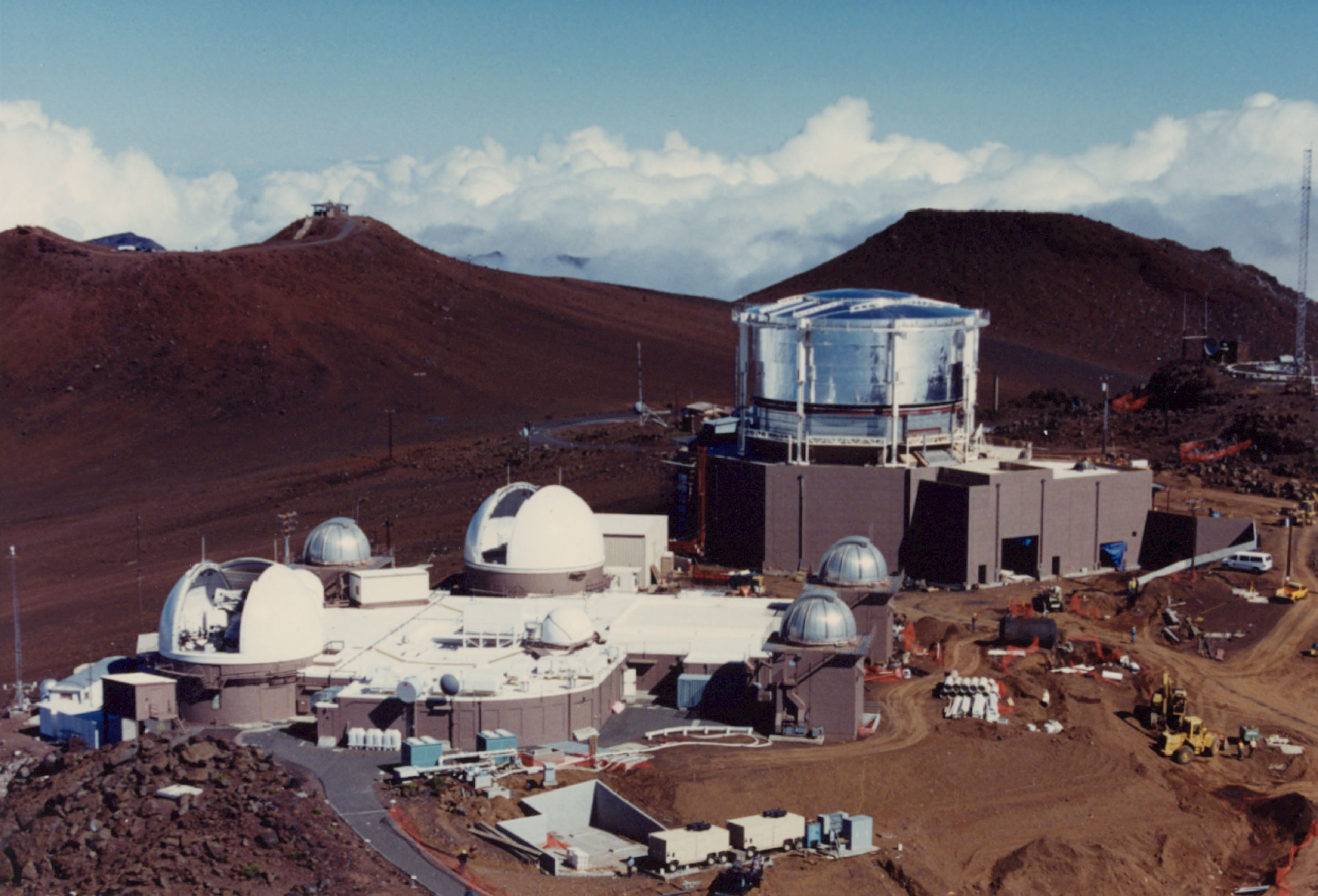
The Air Force Maui Optical and Supercomputing site at Haleakala Observatory in Hawaii. Facilities shown include the Advanced Electro-Optical Telescope, the Maui Space Surveillance System, and one of three Ground-based Electro-Optical Deep Space Surveillance sites.

The Maui Space Surveillance Complex (MSSC) is a U.S. Space Force operating location for the 15th Space Surveillance Squadron and the Air Force Research Laboratory (AFRL) at Haleakala Observatory on Maui, Hawaii, with a twofold mission (608). First, it conducts the research and development mission on the Maui Space Surveillance System (MSSS) at the MSSC. Second, it oversees operation of the Maui High Performance Computing Center (MHPCC). AFRL's research and development mission on Maui was formally called Air Force Maui Optical Station (AMOS) and the Air Force Maui Optical and Supercomputing observatory; the use of the term AMOS has been widespread throughout the technical community for over thirty years and is still used today at many technical conferences. The main-belt asteroid 8721 AMOS is named after the project.

== Origins ==
The MSSS was first envisioned as an optical research observatory in the early 1950s. It was initiated by the Advanced Research Projects Agency (ARPA, later DARPA) in 1961 as the ARPA Midcourse Optical Station (AMOS). It was first proposed by R. Zirkind of ARPA's staff for imaging ballistic missile payloads and decoys during their midcourse phase, and other space objects including satellites, in the infrared spectrum, as well as for performing astronomical research. Its location on Mount Haleakala was nearly ideal for its altitude high above much obscuration by water vapor, for its midcourse location between the missile launch site at Vandenberg Air Force Base and its main reentry location at Kwajalein Atoll, and for its low-latitude location which was advantageous for observing satellites.

The AMOS effort formally began with an amendment to an existing ARPA order with the University of Michigan's Institute for Science and Technology, which was to design, construct, and operate the facility. This amendment defined the AMOS goals as follows: "(1) Identification and signature of space objects; (2) an active program to advance the state of the art in infrared technology and high-resolution imagery; (3) a research program in geophysics and astrophysics including the astronomical community." Design was completed in 1963, and physical plant construction begun by the Army Corps of Engineers. Construction was complete by 1967, after which the telescopes and control systems were evaluated, calibrated, and tested until mid 1969.

In 1969, AMOS potential had been demonstrated, and the Air Force took charge as ARPA's agent. The University of Michigan was replaced by industrial contractors, and numerous system improvements and additions then took place over subsequent years. In 1984, DARPA transferred it to the Air Force, which renamed it as MSSS in 1995.

== Maui Space Surveillance System (MSSS) ==
The accessibility and capability of the Maui Space Surveillance System provides an unequaled opportunity to the scientific community by combining state-of-the-art satellite tracking with a facility supporting research and development.

The Maui Space Surveillance System, is routinely involved in numerous observing programs and has the capability of projecting lasers into the atmosphere. Situated at the crest of the dormant volcano Haleakala (IAU code 608), the observatory stands at an altitude of 3058 metres, latitude 20.7 degrees N, and longitude 156.3 degrees W. It is essentially co-located with IAU code 566, Haleakala-NEAT/GEODSS. Virtually year-round viewing conditions are possible due to the relatively stable climate. Dry, clean air and minimal scattered light from surface sources enable visibility exceeding 150 km. Based on double star observations, seeing is typically on the order of one second of arc.

Spanning over 30 years, the evolution of the Maui Space Surveillance System has demonstrated several stages in the history of space object tracking telescopes. Currently, through its primary mission for the United States Space Force, Space Operations Command, (formerly, Air Force Space Command), the Maui Space Surveillance System combines large-aperture tracking optics with visible and infrared sensors to collect data on near Earth and deep-space objects. In the process of accomplishing its mission, the observatory has discovered a number of asteroids (see § List of discovered minor planets).

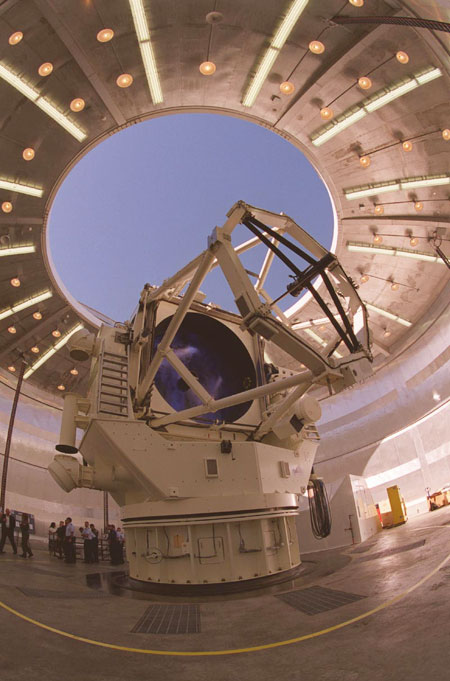
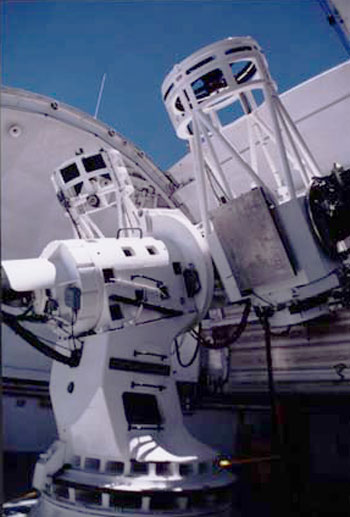
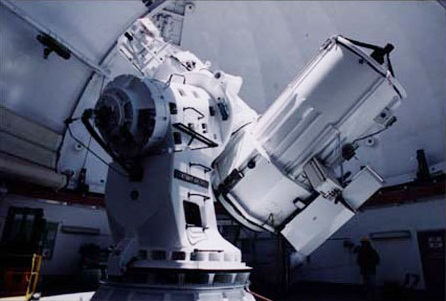
- Top-left: 3.67-meter Advanced Electro Optical System Telescope (AEOS)
- Top-right: 1.2-meter twin telescope (MOTIF)
- Bottom: Haleakala Observatory 1.6-meter telescope mounted on three axis

=== Advanced Electro-Optical System (AEOS) ===
The 3.67-meter telescope, known as the Advanced Electro-Optical System (AEOS), owned by the Department of Defense, is the United States' largest optical telescope designed for tracking satellites. The 75-ton AEOS telescope points and tracks very accurately, yet is fast enough to track both low-Earth satellites and ballistic missiles. AEOS can be used simultaneously by many groups or institutions because its light can be channeled through a series of mirrors to seven independent Coudé focus rooms below the telescope. Employing sophisticated sensors that include an adaptive optics system, radiometer, spectrograph, and long-wave infrared imager, the telescope tracks man-made objects in deep space and performs space object identification data collection.

AEOS is equipped with an adaptive optics system, the heart of which is a 941-actuator deformable mirror that can change its shape to remove the atmosphere's distorting effects. Scientists are expected to get near diffraction-limited images of space objects.

=== Maui Optical Tracking and Identification Facility (MOTIF) ===
The Maui Optical Tracking and Identification Facility (MOTIF) is also hosted at the MSSS site. The system consists of two 1.2-meter telescopes on a common mount. MOTIF is used primarily for Long Wave infrared (LWIR) and photometric data collection.

Other equipment at MSSS includes a 1.6-meter telescope that performs day and night tracking and imaging, a 0.8-meter beam director/tracker, and a 0.6-meter laser beam director. The telescopes accommodate a wide variety of sensor systems, including imaging systems, conventional and contrast mode photometers, infrared radiometers, low light level video systems, and acquisition telescopes.

=== Ground-based Electro-Optical Deep Space Surveillance (GEODSS) ===
The MSSS site, also hosts assets for the Ground-based Electro-Optical Deep Space Surveillance (GEODSS) system.

In addition to these assets, the site has a machine shop, optics laboratories, and electronics laboratories. A Remote Maui Experimental (RME) site at sea level houses additional optics and electronics laboratories. This secondary observation station at Kihei bears IAU code 625 and is located at 20°44′46″N 156°25′54″W.

== Maui High Performance Computing Center (MHPCC) ==
The Maui High Performance Computing Center (MHPCC) is an Air Force Research Laboratory center currently managed by the University of Hawaii and is located in the Maui Research and Technology Park in Kihei. The MHPCC is a leading computing resource of the Department of Defense research and development community and operates numerous computer clusters, including a 5,120 processor Dell Poweredge cluster named "Jaws" which, as of November 2006, was the 11th most powerful computing systems in the world. The Center also has a 12,096 core IBM iDataplex Cluster, named "Riptide" which as November 2013 attained a peak performance Linpack performance of 212 Teraflops and ranked #192 on the Top500 in November 2013.

== List of discovered minor planets ==
| 8721 AMOS | 14 January 1996 | list |
| 9651 Arii-SooHoo | 7 January 1996 | list |
| 10193 Nishimoto | 8 August 1996 | list |
| 10863 Oye | 31 August 1995 | list |
| 11104 Airion | 6 October 1995 | list |
| (11993) 1995 XX | 8 December 1995 | list |
| 12426 Racquetball | 14 November 1995 | list |
| 12443 Paulsydney | 15 March 1996 | list |
| 13168 Danoconnell | 6 December 1995 | list |
| (14066) 1996 FA_{4} | 20 March 1996 | list |
| 14942 Stevebaker | 21 June 1995 | list |
| (19279) 1995 YC_{4} | 28 December 1995 | list |
| (19281) 1996 AP_{3} | 14 January 1996 | list |
| (20128) 1996 AK | 7 January 1996 | list |
| (21244) 1995 XU_{1} | 14 December 1995 | list |
| (26176) 1996 GD_{2} | 15 April 1996 | list |
| 27870 Jillwatson | 12 November 1995 | list |
| (27898) 1996 OS_{2} | 23 July 1996 | list |
| (29395) 1996 PO_{1} | 5 August 1996 | list |
| 31000 Rockchic | 11 November 1995 | list |
| 31020 Skarupa | 17 March 1996 | list |
| 32943 Sandyryan | 13 November 1995 | list |
| (32949) 1996 AR_{3} | 14 January 1996 | list |

| 37692 Loribragg | 12 November 1995 | list |
| (37700) 1996 AL_{3} | 10 January 1996 | list |
| (39671) 1996 AG | 7 January 1996 | list |
| (42544) 1996 EL_{2} | 11 March 1996 | list |
| (43995) 1997 PY_{5} | 14 August 1997 | list |
| 48628 Janetfender | 7 September 1995 | list |
| (48712) 1996 OV_{2} | 26 July 1996 | list |
| (52505) 1996 FD_{4} | 22 March 1996 | list |
| (52506) 1996 FK_{4} | 23 March 1996 | list |
| (52525) 1996 PJ | 8 August 1996 | list |
| (52534) 1996 TB_{15} | 7 October 1996 | list |
| 58365 Robmedrano | 27 July 1995 | list |
| (58575) 1997 RK_{9} | 11 September 1997 | list |
| (73953) 1997 UN_{20} | 27 October 1997 | list |
| (85374) 1996 FC_{4} | 22 March 1996 | list |
| 85386 Payton | 26 July 1996 | list |
| 90817 Doylehall | 1 September 1995 | list |
| 90818 Daverichards | 14 September 1995 | list |
| 90820 McCann | 20 September 1995 | list |
| (90850) 1996 FM_{1} | 16 March 1996 | list |
| (100421) 1996 FF_{4} | 23 March 1996 | list |
| (100425) 1996 HM | 17 April 1996 | list |
| (120624) 1996 EM_{2} | 11 March 1996 | list |

| (120728) 1997 SG_{32} | 28 September 1997 | list |
| (120729) 1997 SH_{32} | 28 September 1997 | list |
| (120738) 1997 TO_{17} | 2 October 1997 | list |
| (150148) 1996 FX_{3} | 20 March 1996 | list |
| (162032) 1995 WJ_{8} | 20 November 1995 | list |
| (164655) 1996 HR_{1} | 22 April 1996 | list |
| (168359) 1996 DH_{3} | 29 February 1996 | list |
| (175698) 1995 UQ_{8} | 20 October 1995 | list |
| (185670) 1995 RS | 14 September 1995 | list |
| (200102) 1995 QH_{3} | 31 August 1995 | list |
| (210481) 1996 HQ_{1} | 20 April 1996 | list |
| (217636) 1996 PH_{3} | 14 August 1996 | list |
| (225304) 1995 WH_{8} | 19 November 1995 | list |
| (225308) 1996 HH | 17 April 1996 | list |
| (237387) 1996 PM_{1} | 1 August 1996 | list |
| (316671) 1995 RN | 1 September 1995 | list |
| (321769) 2010 OR_{30} | 26 July 1996 | list |
| (322504) 2011 WF_{14} | 19 November 1995 | list |
| (382402) 1995 PR | 4 August 1995 | list |
| (415695) 1996 GE_{2} | 15 April 1996 | list |
| (446786) 1996 GD | 7 April 1996 | list |

== See also ==
- Ground-based Electro-Optical Deep Space Surveillance* List of astronomical observatories
- List of minor planet discoverers § Discovering dedicated institutions
- List of astronomical observatories
