= Coleco Adam =

Home computer by Coleco, released in 1983

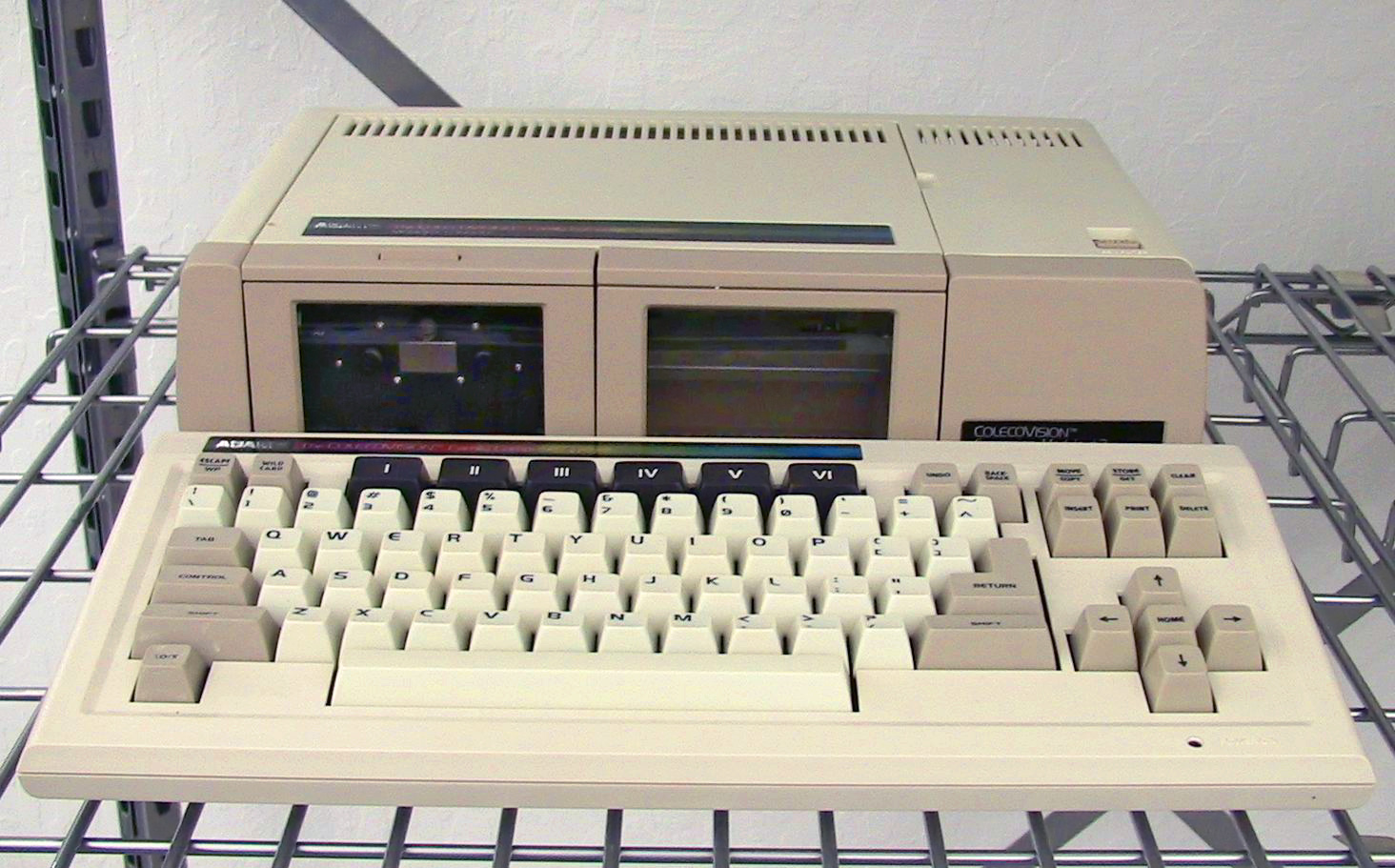
- Developer: Coleco
- Manufacturer: Coleco
- Released: October 1983; 42 years ago
- Introductory price: US$725 (today $2340); CAD$999 (today $2710); GBP£700 (today £2280)
- Discontinued: January 1985
- Operating system: EOS, OS-7 (ColecoVision), CP/M, TDOS
- CPU: Zilog Z80A @ 3.58 MHz
- Memory: 64 KB RAM; 16 KB VRAM
- Storage: Digital Data Pack; Floppy disk (5.25-inch, 160 KB)
- Display: 256 × 192 resolution
- Graphics: Texas Instruments TMS9928A
- Sound: Texas Instruments SN76489AN
- Related: ColecoVision

The Coleco Adam is a home computer by American toy and video game manufacturer Coleco. It was released in October 1983 with the initial price of $700, complete with 64 KB of memory, a tape drive for a proprietary medium called Digital Data Packs, a daisy wheel printer, and productivity applications, along with two DDPs for SmartBASIC and Buck Rogers: Planet of Zoom Super Game.

The Adam was an attempt to follow on the success of the company's ColecoVision video game console, using the ColecoVision hardware as its basis and adding new features for the computer role. It was sold both as a stand-alone system as well as Expansion Module #3 for the ColecoVision, turning existing machines into an Adam. This had the benefit of being entirely compatible with all ColecoVision games and peripherals, while both versions offered good word processing support and produced good looking output with its letter-quality printer.

Although the system concept and presentation were positively received, the Adam was heavily criticized upon launch for numerous hardware defects in early units, with some potentially rendering the device unusable. The Adam also suffered from store availability issues, with Coleco having shipped only 95,000 units rather than the goal of 500,000 by the end of 1983. The Adam was discontinued in January 1985, with Coleco never recovering from the losses incurred. The company discontinued its ColecoVision shortly afterward and finally declared itself bankrupt in 1988.

Despite its failures, it has gained a following among enthusiasts, who continue to develop hardware and software for it.

== History ==
=== Development and introduction ===
Coleco announced the Adam at the Summer Consumer Electronics Show (CES) in June 1983, with sales to start in August and executives predicted sales of 500,000 by Christmas 1983. The company engaged in an extensive marketing campaign, with television commercials for "boys age 8 to 16 and their fathers ... the two groups that really fuel computer purchases", and print advertisements in nontechnical publications like Time and People. Competitors such as Commodore and Atari almost immediately announced similar computer/printer bundles.

The Adam announcement received favorable press coverage. The Boston Phoenix, observing that Adam's $600 price was comparable to the lowest price for a letter-quality printer alone, stated "a nice trick if they can do it!" It was a trick; the computers were shown behind tinted glass that hid the fact that they were hand-made and had non-working tape drives.

In August it promised to ship a half million Adams by Christmas, but missed shipping dates of 1 September, 15 September, 1 October, and 15 October. Ahoy! reported that Coleco had not shipped by early October because of various problems. Each month of delay could mean losing the opportunity to sell 100,000 units, the magazine reported, adding that missing the Christmas season would result in "inestimable losses". CEO Arnold Greenberg promised in late September to ship by "mid-October", but claimed that Adam was "not, primarily, a Christmas item". The printer was the main cause of the delays; after it failed to function properly at demonstrations, by November InfoWorld reported on "growing skepticism" about its reliability, speed, and noise.

From the time of the computer's introduction to the time of its shipment, the price increased, from US$525 to $725. Greenberg refused to say how many units he expected Coleco to ship by the end of the year. The company did not ship review units to magazines planning to publish reviews before Christmas, stating that all were going to dealers, but admitted that it would not meet the company's goal of shipping 400,000 computers by the end of the year; Kmart and JCPenney announced in November that it would not sell the Adam during the Christmas season because of lack of availability. Despite much consumer interest for Adam and a shortage of competing home computers,

Coleco shipped only 95,000 units by December, many of which were defective; Creative Computing later reported that "the rumored return rate was absolutely alarming". One store manager stated that five of six sold Adams had been returned, and expected that the sixth would likely be returned after being opened on Christmas. Coleco partnered with Honeywell Information Systems to open up repair chain stores around the nation. By December 1983, the press reported that company executives at a news conference "fielded questions about Coleco's problems with its highly publicized new Adam home computer, which has been plagued by production delays and complaints of defects", with the company able to fulfill only one third of its Canadian orders for Christmas. Less than 10% of Adam units had defects, the company claimed, "well below industry standards". In January 1984, J. C. Penney announced they would be cancelling the entirety of their Adam orders. They reported that the initial batch of 500 machines they had received had repeatedly flunked quality tests. Furthermore, due to low profit margins and an inability of manufacturers to deliver enough computers, they would drop the sale of computers entirely as of February 1st.

An analyst stated in early 1984 that the company had:

...targeted a very special area: primarily home users who have students or teenage children who are writing term papers and who tend to be naive computer users. Coleco has tried to make the Adam easy to use and attractive to that group, consciously excluding other groups by the way that [they] configured the machine.

By March 1984, John J. Anderson declared Adam as having caused for Coleco "a trail of broken promises, unfulfilled expectations, and extremely skittish stockholders". On January 2, 1985, after continuing complaints about Adam failures and low sales, Coleco announced that it was discontinuing the Adam and would be selling off its inventory.

Coleco revealed that it lost $35 million in late 1983 (the time of the Adam's launch), along with a loss of $13.4 million in the first 9 months of 1984. Coleco did not reveal which company they were selling the inventory to, but stated that they had worked with this partner before. No final sales numbers were revealed of the Adam computer and expansion, but one analyst estimated that Coleco had sold 350,000 Adams in 1983 and 1984.

=== Reception ===
To showcase the machine at the 1983 Summer CES in Chicago, Coleco decided to demonstrate a port of its ColecoVision conversion of Donkey Kong on the system. Nintendo was in the midst of negotiating a deal with Atari to license its Famicom (later called the Nintendo Entertainment System) for distribution outside Japan, and the final signing would have been done at CES. Atari had exclusive rights to Donkey Kong for home computers (as Coleco had for game consoles), and when Atari saw that Coleco was showing Donkey Kong on a computer, its proposed deal with Nintendo was delayed. Coleco had to agree not to sell the Adam version of Donkey Kong. Ultimately, it had no bearing on the Atari/Nintendo deal, as Atari's CEO Ray Kassar was fired the next month and the proposal went nowhere, with Nintendo deciding to market its system on its own.

The September 1983 issue of Byte reported that the Adam's introduction had "dominated" the June CES in Chicago. Citing its $599 price, bundled hardware, and compatibility with ColecoVision and CP/M software, the magazine compared the Adam's potential impact on the home-computer industry to that of the Osborne 1. Ahoy! reported in January 1984 that "early indications were that the Adam would be a runaway best seller" but the delays, technical problems, and Coleco's reputation as a toy company "should combine to keep buyers away in droves", and predicted that "there is no reason to think that the Adam will topple the C-64 from the catbird seat".

The Washington Post's T. R. Reid gave "an 'A' for ingenuity [but] would have to stretch to give Adam a gentleman's 'C' for performance" in January 1984. While praising the keyboard and SmartWriter's ease of use, and calling the data pack "a reasonable compromise", he described the documentation as "wholly inadequate" and "generally inexcusable". Reid said that "a more serious flaw with Adam is in the hardware", citing defects in a data pack and both the printer and a replacement, and the computer's unusability without a working printer. He concluded that "I'd dearly like to" recommend the Adam, but "for the time being, though, I'd advise you to proceed with caution", including confirming that the computer worked before leaving the store. Popular Mechanics in February 1984 was more favorable. Calling the bundle "the most revolutionary concept in how to design and sell a home computer that we have seen", it also praised the keyboard and SmartWriter. While citing flaws such as the "slow and very noisy printer", the magazine concluded that "Adam competes with and overpowers everything else in its class", inferior only to the IBM PC and Apple IIe.

Compute!'s March 1984 review also approved of the Adam's prepackaged, all-in-one nature and called the keyboard "impressive", but cited widespread reports of hardware failures. Byte's April 1984 review was much harsher, stating that "it is often said that if something sounds too good to be true, it probably is. The Coleco Adam is no exception to this rule". It called the tape-drive technology "impressive", and approved of the keyboard, but reported several cases of data errors and deletions when using the tape drives, a buggy word processor, and a BASIC manual that was "the worst I have ever seen". The reviewer reported that he was waiting for his fifth Adam after four previous systems malfunctioned in two months; only the keyboard did not fail. Surmising that "the computer was apparently rushed into production", he advised "don't buy an Adam—yet. Wait until Coleco fixes all of the Adam's bugs and delivers on all of its promises", and concluded "Coleco is [apparently] betting the whole company on the Adam and it's not yet clear that it's going to win that bet".

The Adam received some good reviews based on the quality of its keyboard and printer, and offered competitive sound and graphics. Its BASIC interpreter, called SmartBASIC, was largely compatible with Applesoft BASIC, which meant that many type-in programs from computer books and magazines would work with the Adam with little or no modification.

=== Sales ===
Sales were weak, especially after the technical problems became obvious. Coleco lost $35 million in the fourth quarter of 1984 as returns flooded in. Officially, Coleco blamed "manuals which did not offer the first-time user adequate assistance". Coleco reintroduced Adam with a new instruction manual, lower price, and a $500 college scholarship along with each unit for use by a young child (with $125 paid for each completed year of college). Fewer than 100,000 units ultimately sold.

A New York City-based advertising firm, Ketchum Advertising, won the assignment of promoting the computer. The agency staffed up to handle the work, and the prestige, of the new business. However, when the January 3, 1985, edition of The New York Times reported that Coleco was abandoning the computer, agency executives, who had no prior warning, were caught off-guard.

The Adam was permanently discontinued in 1985, less than two years after its introduction. Coleco never recovered from the $258 million it had suffered in losses, which has been attributed to the launch of the Adam. Shortly after, the company discontinued sales of its ColecoVision line of consoles, and, in 1988, it filed for Chapter 11 bankruptcy. Because of its numerous defects and design flaws, several computer journalists consider it to be one of the worst personal computers of all time.

=== Legacy ===
Despite its critical and commercial failure, the Adam has attracted a group of enthusiasts who continue to develop hardware and software for the computer with the help of early dedicated newsletters. Third-party developers contributed to the overall success of the Adam after Coleco abandoned the Adam. Developers such as Orphanware, In House Reps, Thomas Electronics, Oasis Pensive, Eve, E&T, Micro Innovations, Microfox Technologies and others added multiple-density disk drives, memory expanders, speech synthesizers, serial cards, printer cards, IDE cards and other hardware so the Adam could follow other computers into a newer modern age. A group of Adam enthusiasts have also been gathering every year since 1989 for an event called AdamCon.

== Description ==
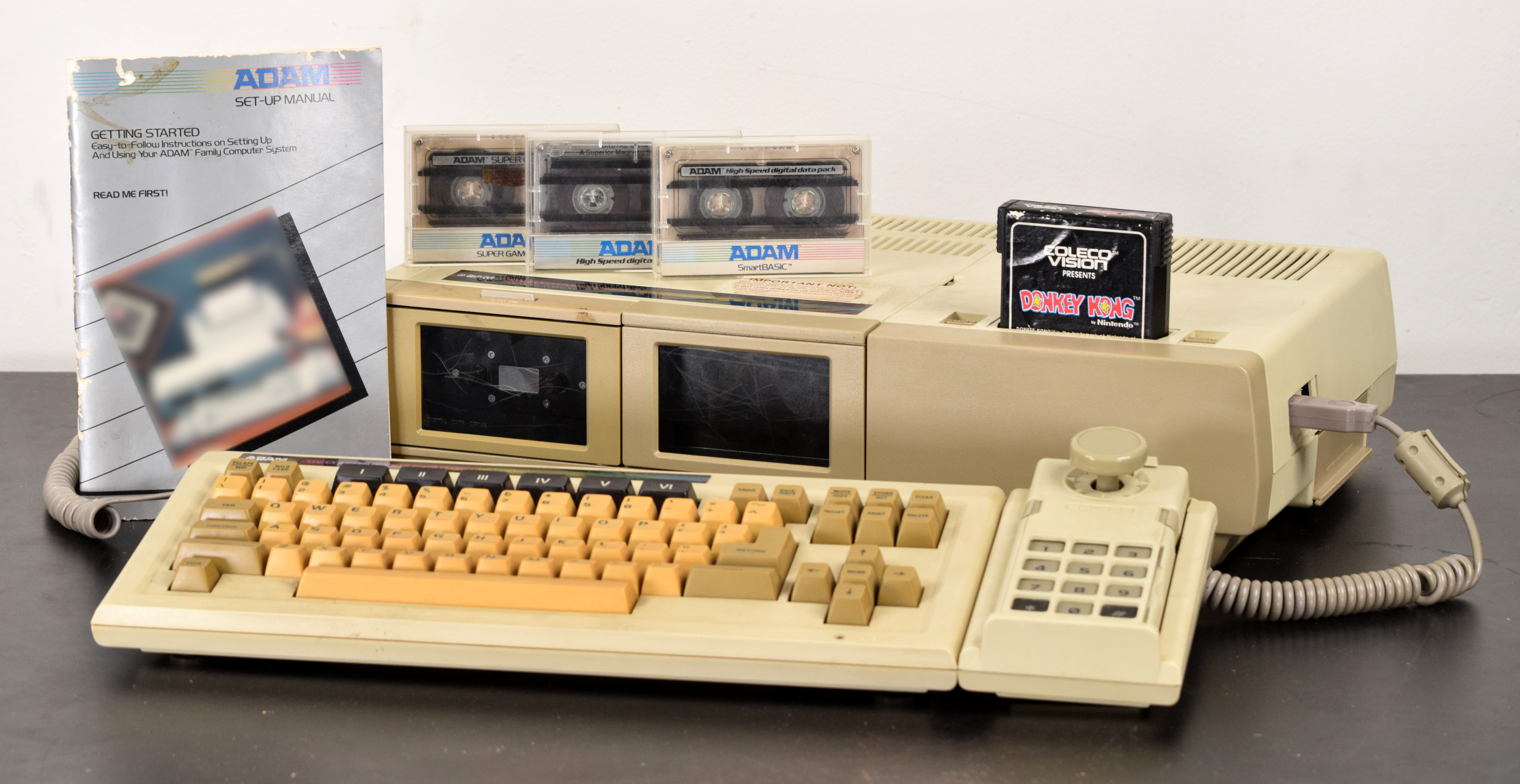
Coleco Adam with its peripherals and software

=== Main hardware ===
One of the key concepts of the Adam design was that it was based on a minimally modified ColecoVision. This allowed it to be purchased as a new stand-alone system, or as an add-on to existing ColecoVision units. This not only allowed the Adam to run all of the existing ColecoVision software, but also help legitimize the ColecoVision as a system that would not require the owner to buy an entirely new machine if they wanted to enter the burgeoning home computer field. This concept required the Adam to be effectively two computers in one case, an original ColecoVision, and a second system to handle all of the new features.

The main system used the Zilog Z80 as its CPU. Although the Z80 was able to run as fast as 4 MHz, in the Adam (as in the ColecoVision) it ran at 3.58 MHz. This is the frequency of the NTSC color burst, and running at this speed reduced interference between the computer and the television set that would normally be used as the computer monitor. The display was driven by the Texas Instruments TMS9928A video display controller (VDC) which could display graphics up to 256x192 in up to 15 colors, and could use up to 32 sprites. Sound was provided by the TI SN76489AN.

In most machines of the era, the CPU and VDC would share access to main memory, lowering the maximum speeds of both as the dynamic RAM chips of the era were generally limited to around 2 MHz. Accessing the video data at the rate needed for 15 colors at 256x192 would leave no time left for the CPU, and most machines offered graphics modes with lower resolution or fewer colors to compensate. In order to allow this high-color mode, a key selling feature of the ColecoVision, the TMS9928A had its own dedicated 16 kB of RAM separate from the CPU's main memory. As the TMS9928A only saw its dedicated memory area it could not drive the memory refresh for the user-side RAM, so the Z80's internal refresh system was used to refresh the main memory.

This second system, known alternately as the Master 6801 or 6801 Master, was based on the Motorola 6800. It handled the new peripherals and the large expansion to the main memory and read-only memory (ROM). In the case of an expanded ColecoVision, the original console was unchanged, but its internal 8 kB ROM and 1 kB of user-accessible DRAM were ignored. In the case of a new-build Adam, these parts were left off, and located only on the Master 6801 on its own card called the Memory and I/0 Board. The two CPUs could both access the common RAM and ROM, with the access being mediated by a DMA controller and address decoder circuitry. The Z80 side of the system connected only to the same external hardware as the ColecoVision, that is, the game controllers, video and sound. All other devices, like the printer, connected to the Memory and I/0 Board via the AdamNet connection which could operate up to 15 devices. Three of these could be connected internally, and the rest using the external Expansion Port.

The Z80 could address a total of 64 kB at any one time. The Adam used a controller to map that 64 kB into two blocks of 32 kB each, low and high. Either one could be further mapped onto one of several different partitions. For instance, when using the SmartWriter software, the lower 32 kB was occupied by the software ROM, while the upper 32 kB was mapped into RAM. When using software loaded from tape, like SmartBASIC, the software would be copied into a portion of the lower RAM, "intrinsic RAM". Any leftover space in this bank, along with another 32 kB in the upper block, could then be used for user programming. The system also included a slot on the I/O board where another 64 kB of RAM could be added and used by software that was aware of it.

=== Basic peripherals ===
The Adam was intended to be sold into a particular market that would find its letter-quality printer a significant selling point, and thus the system was designed to be bundled with the printer. This led to the decision to locate the power supply for the entire system inside the printer, which connected to the computer using the AdamNet interface. Unfortunately, the printer proved to be very unreliable and often required maintenance, but the rest of the computer could not be used without it, meaning that if the printer had to be repaired the entire system was unusable until it was returned. Originally designed to print at 40 characters per second (CPS), the system was found to "fly apart" when run at this speed. It was deliberately slowed down to address this, eventually arriving at a very slow 10 CPS.

The Adam printer computer used daisy wheel printing, giving a higher quality print than most dot-matrix printers of the time. The print ribbon was a one-time ribbon, of the type also used by IBM Selectric typewriters. The one-time ribbon produced better quality print than reusable ribbons, but they needed to be replaced more often. While the print quality was high, the print speed was quite low. Daisy wheels with different fonts were available, but difficult to find. The printer had a friction feed rather than a tractor feed system, so they didn't need continuous form paper. The printer was only capable of printing text, so it couldn't do graphics (other than ASCII art).

In addition to the printer, the Adam added to its role as a word processing system with the use of a full-stroke keyboard with a separate cursor key section and home key area. This connected to the main unit using a coiled cord that plugged into the left side of the unit. This was a significant advantage over systems that had the keyboard built into the case, like the Apple II or Commodore 64, which required the entire unit to be repositioned to adjust the position of the keyboard. It also shipped with one ColecoVision style game controller, colored beige to match the rest of the system.

Like many home computers of its day, the Adam was designed to be able to use a television set for its display via an included RF port and RF modulator; it also supported higher-quality video output to a contemporary computer monitor via a built-in composite video port or a 7-pin DIN connector (which also carried audio). The case allowed the display to be placed on top, in contrast to systems like the C64 or Atari 8-bit machines.

=== Digital Data Pack ===
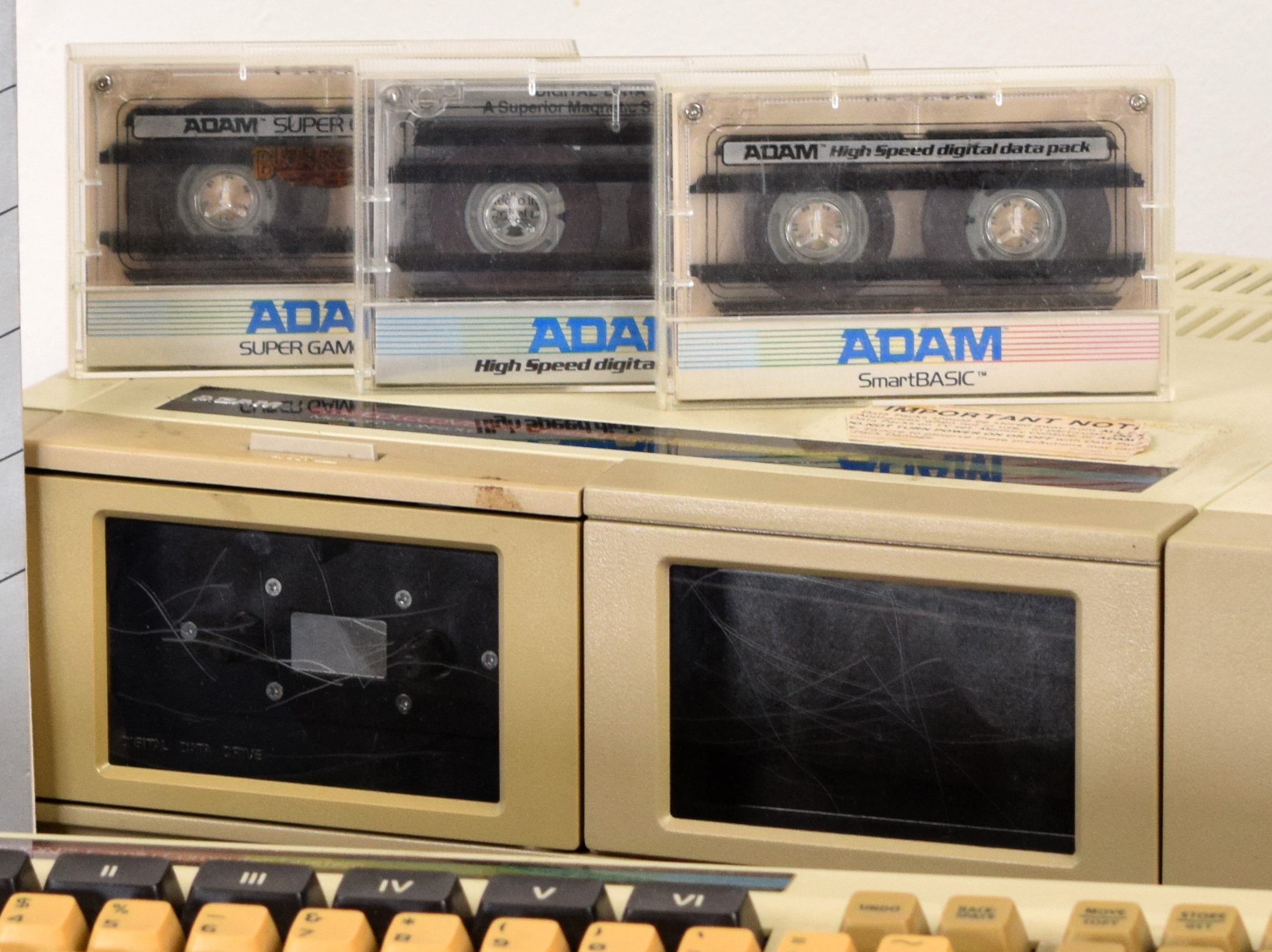
Details of the DDP drive and tapes from the system above. A single DDP drive is installed in this machine, the drive bay on the right is empty.

A unique feature of the Adam was its use of modified cassette tapes for storage, the Digital Data Pack (DDP). In contrast to the many similar systems used on other computers of the era, which used unmodified tape mechanisms, the DDP system used a custom mechanism that ran the tape over ten times as fast, 20 inches (51 cm) per second rather than a normal cassette's 1.875 inches (4.76 cm) per second. The system could also rewind and fast forward under program control, an uncommon feature at the time, at a speed of 80 inches (200 cm) per second.

This high-speed transport allowed it to transfer data much more rapidly than conventional cassettes. The practical data rate was around 1.4 kbytes per second, compared to 300 and 1,200 bits per second (0.12 kbytes second) for conventional cassette systems. This placed the price and performance of the DDP between the slower cassettes and the faster but more expensive floppy disk systems like the Disk II at around 13 to 15 kbytes per second.

Although the tapes themselves were conventional, the cassette case had different locations for the write-protect tab that prevented the use of normal cassettes in the Adam, and prevented the Adam tapes from being overwritten in normal cassette decks - this also prevented them from being copied in normal tape decks which would see them as write-protected. Tapes held a maximum of 256 kB, organized into 256 1 kB blocks. Blocks $00 to $7F were written to one track, and $80 to $FF on a second. The high-speed rewind allowed the entire tape to be used without having to be manually flipped over; when the end of one track was reached the system rapidly rewound it to the start and started reading the second track.

There were two different formats for the tapes, HE and GW. The GW format was intended for software distribution, including SuperBASIC. It was formatted with blocks $00 and $80 at the start of the cassette, and would read the entire file into memory at boot time. In this respect, they were similar to conventional cassettes being used in other systems. As the maximum program size was 64k, and generally would be smaller, only a fraction of the tape would be needed and generally would load rapidly, without the need to rewind to use the second track. For instance, a 32 kB game would fit entirely on track one and load in around 20 seconds. The operating system did not include any code for writing to a GW tape, which provided some level of copy protection as they could only be duplicated using duplicator decks that ignored the write-protect tabs.

The second format, HE, could be read or written to and was used for user data storage like BASIC programs. It had a file directory located in the middle of the tape, and when an HE tape was loaded, the system would forward to this section. When the user wanted to read or write a file, the operating system would read the directory, find the appropriate location on the tape, and then fast forward or rewind to that location. This made the system similar to DECtape in that it offered a more disk-like experience and didn't require the user to manually control the deck to find the appropriate location for a particular file. However, the operating system lacked a way to format a DDP, meaning you had to purchase "blank" DDPs pre-formatted in HE format. In this format, block $00 and $80 were located just past the directory, so the blocks at the start of the tape were $40 and $C0.

The system shipped with one DDP drive, and a second could be connected internally in a spare slot on the left side of the case. Floppy drives were also available and could be connected externally using the AdamNet connectors. When booted, the EOS operating system would look for a valid boot media in floppy 1, then 2, then DDP 1 and 2.

=== Operating systems ===
The built-in 32 kB ROM contained both the SmartWriter software and a basic operating system known as EOS, for Elementary Operating System. In modern terms, EOS would be known as a software library, not an operating system, as it is not in control of the hardware. User programs could call EOS to provide standardized functionality, but the system as a whole was directed by that program, not EOS. Although EOS was supplied on ROM, it did not run from ROM. Instead, if the boot sequence used EOS, it was copied into RAM at locations $D390 to $FFFF, the upper portion of the memory map. The program was then free to overwrite sections it did not use, which could be used, for instance, to store program code in this area and thereby free up more RAM in other parts of memory.

The system also included the ColecoVision's operating system, OS_7. This was a much simpler set of routines mostly dedicated to graphics and sound, but also containing code for handling interrupts and similar tasks.

== Software ==
The Adam had a large software library from the start. It was derived from the ColecoVision and is compatible with the ColecoVision's software and accessories; in addition, the popular CP/M operating system was available as an option. Its price gave a complete system: a computer with 64 KB of RAM, a tape drive for a proprietary medium called Digital Data Packs, a letter-quality daisy wheel printer, a typewriter application, and a word processor called SmartWriter, along with two DDPs for SmartBASIC and the Buck Rogers: Planet of Zoom Super Game.

The SmartWriter electronic typewriter loaded when the system was turned on. In this mode, the system operated just like a typewriter, printing letters as soon as the user typed them. Pressing the Escape/WP key put SmartWriter into word processor mode, which functioned similarly to a modern word processor.

The IBM PCjr sold for $669 but included no peripherals, and although the popular Commodore 64 sold for around $200, its price was not much lower after the purchase of a printer, tape or disk drive, and software.

== SmartBASIC ==
Unlike other home computers at the time, the Adam did not have its BASIC interpreter stored in ROM. Instead, it featured a built-in electronic typewriter and word processor, SmartWriter, as well as the Elementary Operating System (EOS) OS kernel and the 8 KB OS-7 ColecoVision operating system. The SmartBASIC interpreter was delivered on a Digital Data Pack tape cassette; this version of BASIC was designed to be mostly compatible with Applesoft BASIC. The interpreter was developed by Randall Hyde of Lazer Microsystems.

Software developers who received technical information from Coleco had to agree to an extremely restrictive license. Coleco demanded the right to inspect and demand changes in their software, forced them to destroy inventories of software if Coleco revoked the license, and prohibited them from publicly criticizing Coleco in any way.

A less expensive version of the Adam plugged into a ColecoVision, which delivered on one of ColecoVision's launch commitments that owners would one day be able to upgrade their game system to a fully featured computer system.

== Technical issues ==
Many early Adams were defective. An author of the computer's manual reported receiving "300 calls on Christmas week" from owners with problems, saying that some callers were on their fourth or fifth Adam. A defective computer could at the time only be repaired by mailing it to Coleco in Connecticut. Despite improving product quality and the Honeywell repair partnership, the company could not improve the computer's poor reputation. Problems included:

- The Adam generates a surge of electromagnetic energy on startup, which can erase the contents of any removable media left in or near the drive. Making this problem worse, some of the Coleco manuals instructed the user to put the tape in the drive before turning the computer on. A sticker on later Adams warned users to not turn the power on or off with tapes in the drive.
- Since Coleco made the unusual decision of using the printer to supply power to the entire Adam system, if the printer's power supply failed or the printer was missing, none of the system worked. Amstrad CPC and PC designs of the era had a similar set up with the power supply in the monitor.
- Once put into Word Processor mode, SmartWriter could not get back into the typewriter mode without the system being rebooted. However, booting to the word processor took less than a second.
- The Adam's Digital Data Pack drives, although faster and of higher capacity than the audio cassette drives used for competing computers, were less reliable and still not as fast as a floppy disk drive. At the time of Adam's design, tape drives were still a popular storage medium for home users, but by the time of its release, floppy disks had dropped in cost and in some markets were the preferred medium. Coleco eventually shipped a 160 KB 5¼ inch disk drive for the Adam.

== Software ==
ColecoVision software that was not built-in was mostly on ROM cartridges, with AdamCalc, Personal Checkbook, and SmartFiler programs also being on tape.

- Adam Banner
- AdamCalc
- Business Pack I
- CP/M 2.2 and Assembler
- Data Calculator
- Home Budget Planning
- Personal Accountant
- Personal Checkbook
- Power Print
- Savings and Loan
- SmartFiler
- SmartLetters & Forms
- SmartLOGO
- Turbo Load
- Update for Coleco AdamLink Modem

== Add-ons ==
- 160 KB 5¼ inch disk drive The Adam could use two of these.
- 64 KB RAM memory card.
- 300 BAUD modem.
- Atari 2600 console emulator.
- 80-column card, which needed a serial terminal card that could drive a composite monochrome monitor.

== Specifications ==
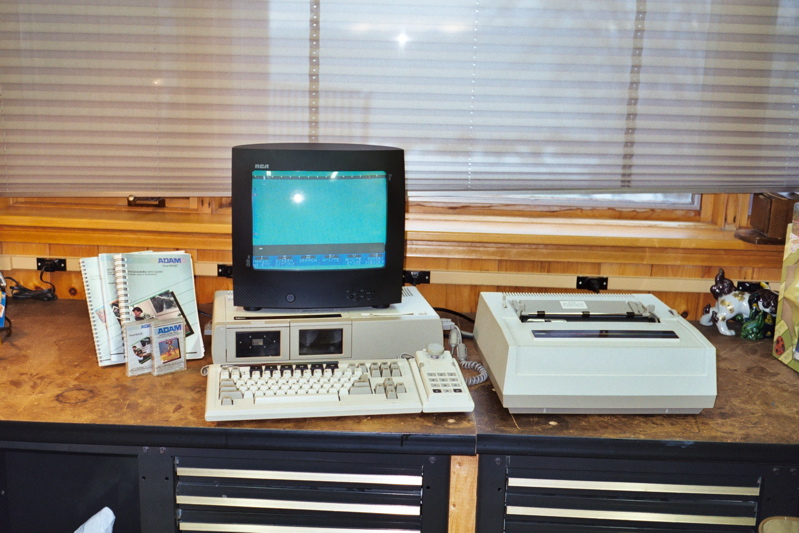
The Coleco Adam, in word processing mode

- CPU: Zilog Z80 @ 3.58 MHz
- Support processors: three Motorola 6801 processors at 1 MHz (memory & I/O, tape, and keyboard control)
- Memory: 64 KB RAM, 16 KB video RAM; 32 KB ROM
- Expansion: 3 internal slots, 1 cartridge slot, and a 62.5 kbit/s half-duplex serial bus called AdamNet. Both the stand-alone and expansion-module versions also have an external expansion port of the same type as the ColecoVision expansion port, on the right hand side.
- Secondary storage: Digital Data Pack tape cassette, 256 KB
- Graphics: Texas Instruments TMS9928A (a close relative of the TMS9918 in the TI-99/4A)
  - 256 × 192 resolution
  - 32 monochrome sprites, max. 4 per scanline
- Sound: Texas Instruments SN76489AN (a rebranded version of the TMS9919 in the TI-99/4A)
  - 3 voices
  - white noise
