= AOZ =

AOZ may refer to:

- Uab Meto language (ISO 639 language code aoz), an Austronesian language of the Timorese
- Antifašističkim odborom žena (AOZ; Serbo-Croatian: Antifascist Organization of Women), original name of the Women's Antifascist Front of Yugoslavia
- Aoz Roon, a fictional character from the Brian Aldiss Helliconia trilogy

== See also ==
- A0Z, a postal code in Canada for Newfoundland and Labrador
- AOS (disambiguation)
