= Adaptive Execution Office =

DARPA office

The Adaptive Execution Office (AEO) was one of two new DARPA offices created in 2009 by director Regina Dugan. AEO focuses on technology transition, technology assessment, rapid productivity and adaptive systems. It is now operating as ACO-T, the Adaptive Capabilities Office — Transition.
