= Echoes of Silence (song) =

Song by the Weeknd

from the album Echoes of Silence
- Released: December 21, 2011
- Genre: Lo-fi
- Length: 4:02
- Label: XO
- Songwriters: Abel Tesfaye; Carlo Montagnese
- Producer: Illangelo

Music video
- "Echoes of Silence" on YouTube

Echoes of Silence is a song by the Canadian singer-songwriter the Weeknd, and serves as the ninth track from his third mixtape of the same name (2011). It was released through XO on December 21, 2011, alongside the mixtape. In 2012, the song was remastered and released commercially on the Weeknd's compilation album, Trilogy (2012). The song was written by the Weeknd alongside its producer, Illangelo.

== Composition and lyrics ==
Kerry Doole of Billboard described the song as a "haunting ballad," writing that the song displays both the Weeknd at his most vulnerable and his emotional expressiveness, while in a track by track review in 2011, Billboard said the song could be the Weeknd's "Someone Like You", saying the mixtape ends with him "lonely and gorgeously rendered". The Fader described the song as a "relatively lo-fi piano dirge".

== Music video ==
For the mixtape's tenth anniversary, the Weeknd released a music video for "Echoes of Silence" on December 21, 2021. The video was directed by the Japanese illustrator Hajime Sorayama, who was heavily involved in the mixtape's promotional merchandise following its re-release in 2021. Billboard reported that the Weeknd made the video as a gift to his older fans, and described it as a "futuristic" music video, with Adrian Spinelli of Uproxx describing it as a "post-apocalyptic Romeo and Juliet story", with robots wanting to connect with each other as the world around them crumbles. Spinelli wrote that the visual felt like "I, Robot crossed with Wall-E." The Fader noted that the robots featured in the video are a signature style of Sorayama's, which are chrome-finished.
