= EOS (8-bit operating system) =

Elementary Operating System
- Developer: Coleco Industries, Inc.
- Written in: Z80 Assembly language
- Working state: Discontinued, historic
- Initial release: 1983; 42 years ago
- Latest release: EOS-7
- Available in: English
- Platforms: Coleco Adam
- Default user interface: Text user interface
- License: Proprietary software

EOS is the built-in operating system of the Coleco Adam. There are bindings in high-level programming languages like BASIC.

== Overview ==
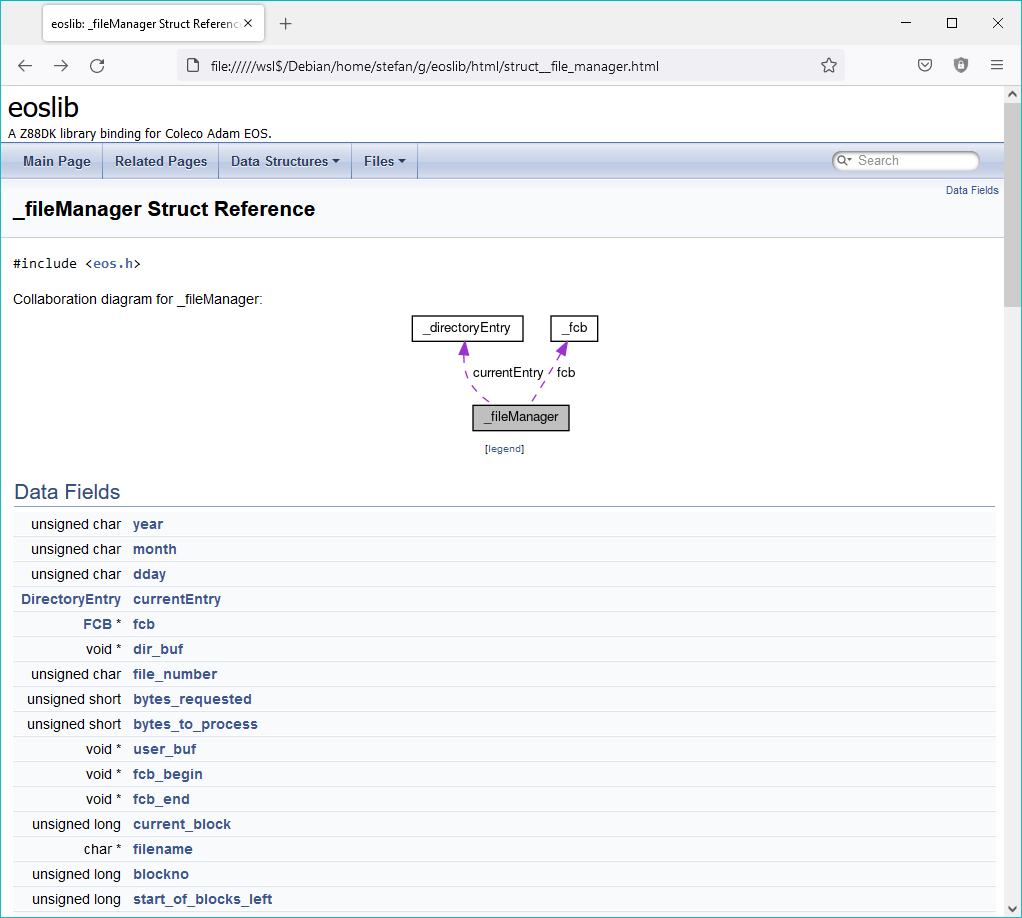
EOS-API with Doxygen

The functions are grouped into categories as follows.

=== Executive calls ===
- eos_init
- eos_hard_init
- eos_hard_reset_net
- eos_delay_after_hard_reset
- eos_synchronize_clocks
- eos_scan_for_devices
- eos_relocate_pcb
- eos_soft_init
- eos_exit_to_smartwriter
- eos_switch_memory_banks

=== Console Output ===
- eos_console_init
- eos_console_display_regular
- eos_console_display_special

=== Printer Interface ===
- eos_print_character
- eos_print_buffer
- eos_printer_status
- eos_start_print_character
- eos_end_print_character

=== Keyboard Interface ===
- eos_keyboard_status
- eos_read_keyboard
- eos_start_read_keyboard
- eos_end_read_keyboard

=== File Operations ===
- eos_file_manager_init
- eos_check_directory_for_file
- eos_find_file_1
- eos_find_file_2
- eos_find_file_in_fcb
- eos_check_file_mode
- eos_make_file
- eos_update_file_in_directory
- eos_open_file
- eos_close_file
- eos_read_file
- eos_write_file
- eos_trim_file
- eos_initialize_directory
- eos_reset_file
- eos_get_date
- eos_put_date
- eos_delete_file
- eos_rename_file

=== Device Operations ===
- eos_find_pcb
- eos_find_dcb
- eos_request_device_status
- eos_get_device_status
- eos_soft_reset_device
- eos_soft_reset_keyboard
- eos_soft_reset_printer
- eos_read_block
- eos_read_one_block
- eos_start_read_one_block
- eos_end_read_one_block
- eos_write_block
- eos_write_one_block
- eos_start_write_one_block
- eos_end_write_one_block
- eos_start_read_character_device
- eos_end_read_character_device
- eos_read_character_device
- eos_start_write_character_device
- eos_end_write_character_device
- eos_write_character_device

=== Video RAM Management ===
- eos_set_vdp_ports
- eos_set_vram_table_address
- eos_load_ascii_in_vdp
- eos_put_ascii_in_vdp
- eos_write_vram
- eos_read_vram
- eos_put_vram
- eos_get_vram
- eos_write_vdp_register
- eos_read_vdp_register
- eos_fill_vram
- eos_calculate_pattern_position
- eos_point_to_pattern_position
- eos_write_sprite_table

=== Game Controllers ===
- eos_read_game_controller
- eos_update_spinner

=== Sound Routines ===
- eos_sound_init
- eos_sound_off
- eos_start_sound
- eos_play_sound
- eos_end_sound

=== Subroutines ===
- eos_decrement_low_nibble
- eos_decrement_high_nibble
- eos_move_high_nibble_to_low_nibble
- eos_add_a_to_hl
