= Cisco Eos =

Cisco Eos Icon

Cisco Eos (Entertainment Operating System) was a software platform for Media & Entertainment (M&E) companies developed by the Cisco Media Solutions Group.

Unlike the Canon EOS product, Cisco says that "Eos" is not an acronym, but is pronounced as a word (i.e., EE-oss)

Eos is reported to be focused on helping M&E companies connect with online fans experiencing the disruptive technology known as the digitization of content.

== Overview ==
Cisco Eos is a hosted Software as a service (SaaS) platform that integrates features from multiple point solutions that enable M&E companies to "create, manage, and grow online communities" built around branded entertainment content.

Eos supports all entertainment genres and incorporates social networking, content management, site administration, and audience analytics features into a single operating environment, using CMS similar to Joomla! or WordPress.

=== Leadership ===
Cisco Eos is developed by the Cisco Media Solutions Group, led by Cisco employee Dan Scheinman.

== History ==
Cisco concerns manufacturing network devices. In 2003, Cisco acquired Linksys and its line of home networking products. Cisco acquired Scientific Atlanta in 2006 and Pure Digital (the maker of Flip Video cameras) in 2009.

Eos was launched as a homegrown addition to Cisco’s Consumer portfolio in January 2009 at the Consumer Electronics Show (CES).

At CES 2010, Cisco announced Eos 2.0. Eos 2.0 includes Facebook Connect integration, migration tools for companies with existing sites and communities, and public APIs for third party developers to expand and use the platform. Eos 2.0 also features member group management to enhance fan engagement and monetization.

=== Closure ===
In April 2011 it was announced that Cisco will be closing down the EOS team.

== Customers ==
The first customer announced for Eos was Warner Music Group. The first two Atlantic Records sites powered by Cisco Eos were Laura Izibor and Sean Paul. Michael Nash, executive VP of digital strategy and development at WMG, said that they chose to partner with Cisco, because "we are not a technology company". According to Warner, with sites powered by Cisco Eos, the average unique user spends roughly 8.4 minutes on an artist site; this level of engagement is more than 25 percent higher than on non-Eos sites.

Additional customers announced at CES 2010 include Tenth Street Entertainment and Travel Channel. It has been stated that "According to Allen Kovac, founder and CEO, The Eleven Seven Music Group/Tenth Street Entertainment, the relationship with Cisco and the Cisco Eos platform allows the company to expand its online presence... " Adam Sutherland, VP of strategy and business development at Travel Channel, said, "The Eos platform allows us to provide tools for our community to contribute, comment and rate content."

In March 2010, Dogwoof became the first Cisco Eos customer in the U.K. Anna Godas, co-founder of Dogwoof, said "today's film industry requires Dogwoof to play a much more interactive role with both the audience and filmmakers ." In May 2010, LOCOG became the second Eos customer in the U.K. and the first in the sports vertical.

== Partner program ==
Cisco announced its Eos Partner Program at CES 2010. Initial partners include Hot Studio, The Wonder Factory, HCL, and Infosys.

== Disadvantages ==
Eos is more expensive than most of its competitors. All data is stored on Cisco servers which creates potential problems if the site has to be transferred.

== See also ==
- Cisco Systems
