= Cummins Aeos =

Aeos

Overview
- Type: Semi truck tractor unit
- Manufacturer: Cummins
- Assembly: Roush Industries
- Designer: Cummins

Body and chassis
- Class: Class 7
- Body style: Day cab
- Chassis: 2 axle

Powertrain
- Electric motor: 2 asynchronous motors
- Transmission: Single-stage reducer
- Propulsion: Electric
- Battery: 140 kWh
- Electric range: 161 km (100 mi)
- Plug-in charging: AC

Dimensions
- Curb weight: 8,165 kg (18,000 lb)

The Cummins Aeos is a concept electric-powered semi-truck tractor unit, an Urban Hauler Tractor, designed by Cummins. The vehicle is named after Aeos, the flying horse, one of four, of Greek mythology that pulled the chariot of the god Helios across the sky; and the Sun with it. It is the first fully electric heavy-duty truck revealed to the public, and the first electric model from Cummins. The aerodynamic semi truck body was designed by Cummins partner Roush Industries, while Cummins focused on the battery and driveline systems.

== Specifications ==
The Aeos is an 18,000 pounds (8,200 kg) short-haul day-cab two-axle Class 7 tractor unit (prime-mover). It is to have a 140 kWh battery pack that will allow a range of 100 miles (160 km) when hauling the maximum load of 44,000 pounds (20,000 kg). The Li-ion battery is to have a 1-hour recharge time. Additional battery packs could extend the range to 300 miles (480 km). It is equipped with regenerative braking and low rolling resistance tires to maximize the range. An option for a range extender engine (the Cummins B4.5 or B6.7 motors) could be added for additional range. The big rig truck would have a gross vehicle weight rating of 75,000 pounds (34,000 kg). Solar panels can be equipped onto the trailer to increase range.

== Production ==
Production was slated for 2019, with OEM production partners, and not by Cummins itself. Cummins was said to provide battery and driveline systems to its production partners. As of March 2021, there is no mention of this vehicle on the Cummins website.
