= 3.67 m Advanced Electro Optical System Telescope =

U.S. Air Force optical telescope in Hawaii

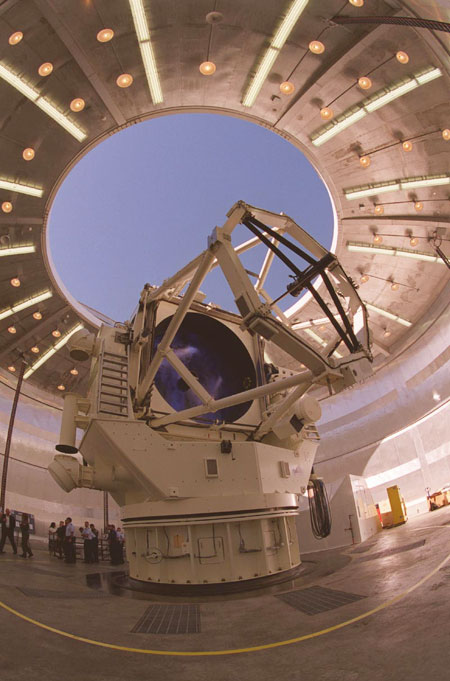
- Alternative names: Advanced Electro-Optical System
- Location(s): Haleakalā Observatory, Haleakalā, Maui County, Hawaii
- Coordinates: 20°42′30″N 156°15′25″W
- Diameter: 3.67 m (12 ft 0 in)
- Location within Hawaii
- Related media on Commons

The 3.67 m Advanced Electro Optical System Telescope is a Department of Defense telescope at Haleakala Observatory. The telescope is part of the Maui Space Surveillance Complex (MSSC), which in turn is part of the Air Force Maui Optical and Supercomputing Site (AMOS).

The 3.67-meter telescope, known as the Advanced Electro-Optical System (AEOS), owned by the Department of Defense, is the United States' largest optical telescope designed for tracking satellites. The 75-ton AEOS telescope points and tracks very accurately, yet is fast enough to track both low-Earth satellites and ballistic missiles. It can slew at nearly 20 degrees per second. It is an f/200 instrument and has an extremely narrow field of view. AEOS can be used simultaneously by many groups or institutions because its light can be channeled through a series of mirrors to seven independent Coudé focus rooms below the telescope. Employing sophisticated sensors that include an adaptive optics system, radiometer, spectrograph, and long-wave infrared imager, the telescope tracks man-made objects in deep space and performs space object identification data collection.

AEOS is equipped with an adaptive optics system, the heart of which is a 941-actuator deformable mirror that can change its shape to remove the atmosphere's distorting effects. Scientists are expected to get near-diffraction-limited images of space objects.

== See also ==
- Air Force Maui Optical and Supercomputing observatory
- List of largest optical reflecting telescopes
