= EO =

Eo or EO may refer to:

== Businesses and organizations ==
- Education Otherwise, a home education organization
- Elevorganisasjonen, a Norwegian student organization
- Entrepreneurs' Organization, a nonprofit network
- Evangelische Omroep, a public broadcaster in the Netherlands
- Executive Outcomes, a South African military company
- Express One International, an airline
- Hewa Bora Airways (IATA code EO), a defunct airline in the Democratic Republic of the Congo

== Language ==
- Eo (constructed language)
- Esperanto (ISO code EO), a constructed language
- eo (digraph), represents a single or two vowels in some languages
- Eo (hangul) vowel in Korean Hangul

== Science and technology ==
=== Computing ===
- EO Personal Communicator, an early tablet computer produced by AT&T subsidiary EO, Inc.
- Eight Ones, a character code
- A line of tablet computers made by TabletKiosk

=== Other uses in science and technology ===
- "eo-" (derived from "Eos", meaning "dawn"), used to describe many early animals in the fossil record
  - Eoarchean, the first era of the Archean Eon
- Earth observation
- Electro-optics
- Eosinophilic oesophagitis, or Eosinophilic esophagitis, an allergic inflammatory condition of the esophagus
- Ethylene oxide, a chemical compound
- Extremal optimization, a type of optimization heuristic inspired by self-organized criticality

== Other uses ==
- Eastern Orthodoxy, a major Christian branch
  - Eastern Orthodox Church
- EO (film), a 2022 film
- EO (rapper), a rapper from London
- Eo (river), a river in Spain
- Eo (instrument), a Korean percussion instrument
- East Otago, part of New Zealand's South Island
- Captain EO, a 3D film
- Equal opportunity, a term related to civil rights
- Equipment Operator (US Navy), a Seabee occupational rating in the U.S. Navy
- Executive Officer, a person responsible for the running of an organization
- Executive order (United States), a directive issued by the President of the United States
- Hyundai EO, as a Hyundai Elexio short name for the Chinese EV market
- National roads in Greece, whose road numbers begin with "EO" (Greek: Εθνική Οδός)
