= Haleakalā Observatory =

Astronomical observatory on Maui Island, Hawaii, USA

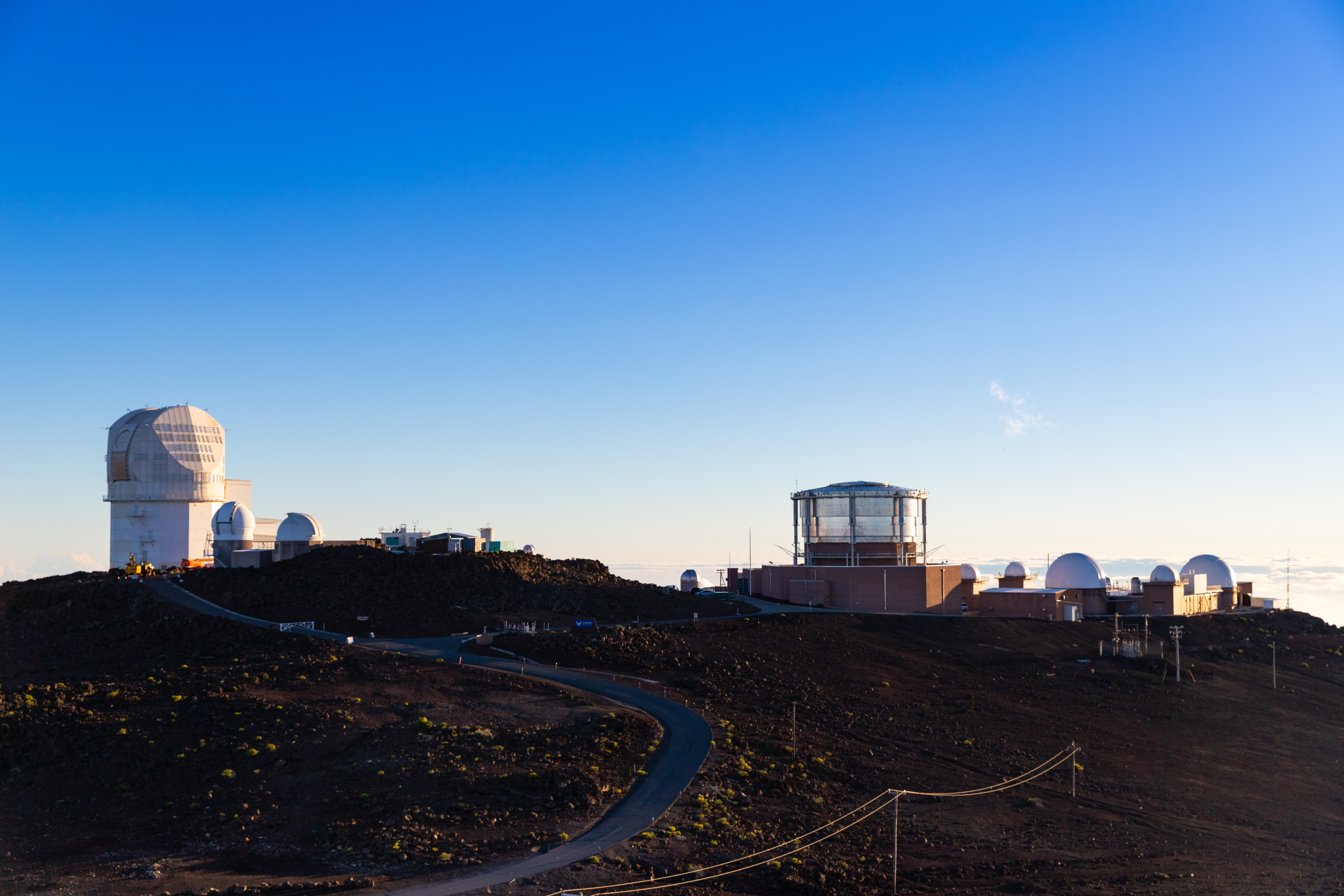
- Haleakalā Observatory with DKIST (left) and AEOS Telescope (right)
- Alternative names: Haleakala Observatory
- Organization: Institute for Astronomy
- Location: Haleakalā, Hawaii, United States
- Coordinates: 20°42′30″N 156°15′26″W
- Altitude: 3,052 m (10,013 ft)
- Established: 1961
- Website: about.ifa.hawaii.edu/facility/haleakala-observatories/
- Telescopes: ATLAS–HKO observatory; Daniel K. Inouye Solar Telescope; Faulkes Telescope North; Maui Space Surveillance Complex; Pan-STARRS
- Location within Hawaii
- Related media on Commons

The Haleakalā Observatory, also known as the Haleakalā High Altitude Observatory Site, is Hawaii's first astronomical research observatory. It is located on the island of Maui and is owned by the Institute for Astronomy of the University of Hawaiʻi, which operates some of the facilities on the site and leases portions to other organizations. Tenants include the Air Force Research Laboratory (AFRL) and the Las Cumbres Observatory Global Telescope Network (LCOGTN). At over 3,050 meters (10,010 ft) in elevation, the summit of Haleakalā is above one third of the Earth's troposphere and has excellent astronomical seeing conditions. Under very clear conditions, the complex is visible from Makakilo on the island of Oahu, over 200km away.

== Facilities ==
=== Mees Solar Observatory ===
The Mees Solar Observatory (MSO) is named after Kenneth Mees and dedicated in 1964. It consists of one dome with multiple instruments sharing a common mount.

=== Pan-STARRS ===
The Panoramic Survey Telescope and Rapid Response System (Pan-STARRS) is a pair of telescopes plus a computing facility that surveys the sky on a continual basis, providing accurate astrometry and photometry of detected objects. By detecting any differences from previous observations of the same areas of the sky, it has discovered over 5,700 new asteroids, comets, variable stars and other celestial objects. Currently, the 1.8-meter (71 in) PS1 telescope is in operation and the PS2 is in its commissioning phase.

=== Faulkes Telescope North ===
The Faulkes Telescope North, part of the Faulkes Telescope Project, is a 2.0-meter (79 in) reflecting telescope owned and operated by the Las Cumbres Observatory Global Telescope Network. It provides remote access to a research-quality telescope primarily to students in the United Kingdom.

=== TLRS-4 Laser Ranging System ===
The TLRS-4 Laser Ranging System is part of the International Laser Ranging Service (ILRS), which provides satellite laser ranging and lunar laser ranging data. The TLRS-4 replaced an older facility in order to provide continuity of data. The old facility now houses telescopes of the Pan-STARRS project.

=== Zodiacal Light Observatory ===
The Zodiacal Light Observatory currently consists of two instruments. The Scatter-free Observatory for Limb Active Regions and Coronae (SOLARC or SOLAR-C) telescope is a 0.5-meter (20 in) off-axis reflecting coronagraph that is used to study the Sun's corona. The Day-Night Seeing Monitor Telescope System (DNSM) makes telescope-independent observations of perturbations in the atmosphere above Haleakala.

=== Maui Space Surveillance Complex ===
The Air Force Office of Scientific Research (AFOSR) of the Air Force Research Laboratory (AFRL) operates the Maui Space Surveillance Complex (MSSC), which is part of the Air Force Maui Optical and Supercomputing Site (AMOS). Located at the MSSC are the 3.67-meter (144 in) Advanced Electro Optical System Telescope (AEOS), the Maui Space Surveillance System (MSSS), and the Ground-based Electro-Optical Deep Space Surveillance (GEODSS). The MSSS uses a number of optical assets, including a 1.6-meter (63 in) telescope, two 1.2-meter (47 in) telescopes on a common mount, a 0.8-meter (31 in) beam director/tracker, and a 0.6-meter (24 in) laser beam director. The GEODSS uses two 1.0-meter (39 in) telescopes and one 0.38-meter (15 in) telescope.

=== Daniel K. Inouye Solar Telescope ===
The Daniel K. Inouye Solar Telescope (DKIST) is a 4.0-meter (160 in) solar telescope of the National Solar Observatory.

=== Future facilities ===
- The AFRL has plans to build a mirror re-coating facility adjacent to the AEOS building.

=== Former facilities ===
- A Baker-Nunn telescope operated from 1957 to 1976 as part of Project Space Track.
- The Lunar Ranging Experiment (LURE) Observatory operated from 1974 until 2004. The Pan-STARRS PS1 now resides in the south dome of the LURE facility and the PS2 is being built in the north dome.
- The University of Chicago Enrico Fermi Institute operated the Haleakala Cosmic Ray Neutron Monitor Station from 1991 to 2007.
- The Haleakala Gamma Ray Observatory was a six-mirror Imaging Atmospheric Cherenkov Telescope on an equatorial mount. It began operating in 1981 and was upgraded in 1988.
- The Multicolor Active Galactic Nuclei Monitoring (MAGNUM) was a 2.0-meter (79 in) near infrared telescope operated by the University of Tokyo. It was housed in the LURE facility's north dome from 1998 to 2008.
- Observations of airglow were made from a platform near the middle of the site in the 1960s and 1970s. The platform is now used for temporary projects.
- The Near-Earth Asteroid Tracking (NEAT) program operated from 2000 to 2007 using one of the MSSS 1.2-meter telescopes.

=== Non-astronomical facilities ===
- The Federal Aviation Administration operates a facility immediately to the west of the observatory site.
- The Department of Energy also operates a facility immediately to the west of the observatory site.
- A small building on the site is used by the Haleakalā Amateur Astronomers.

== Gallery ==
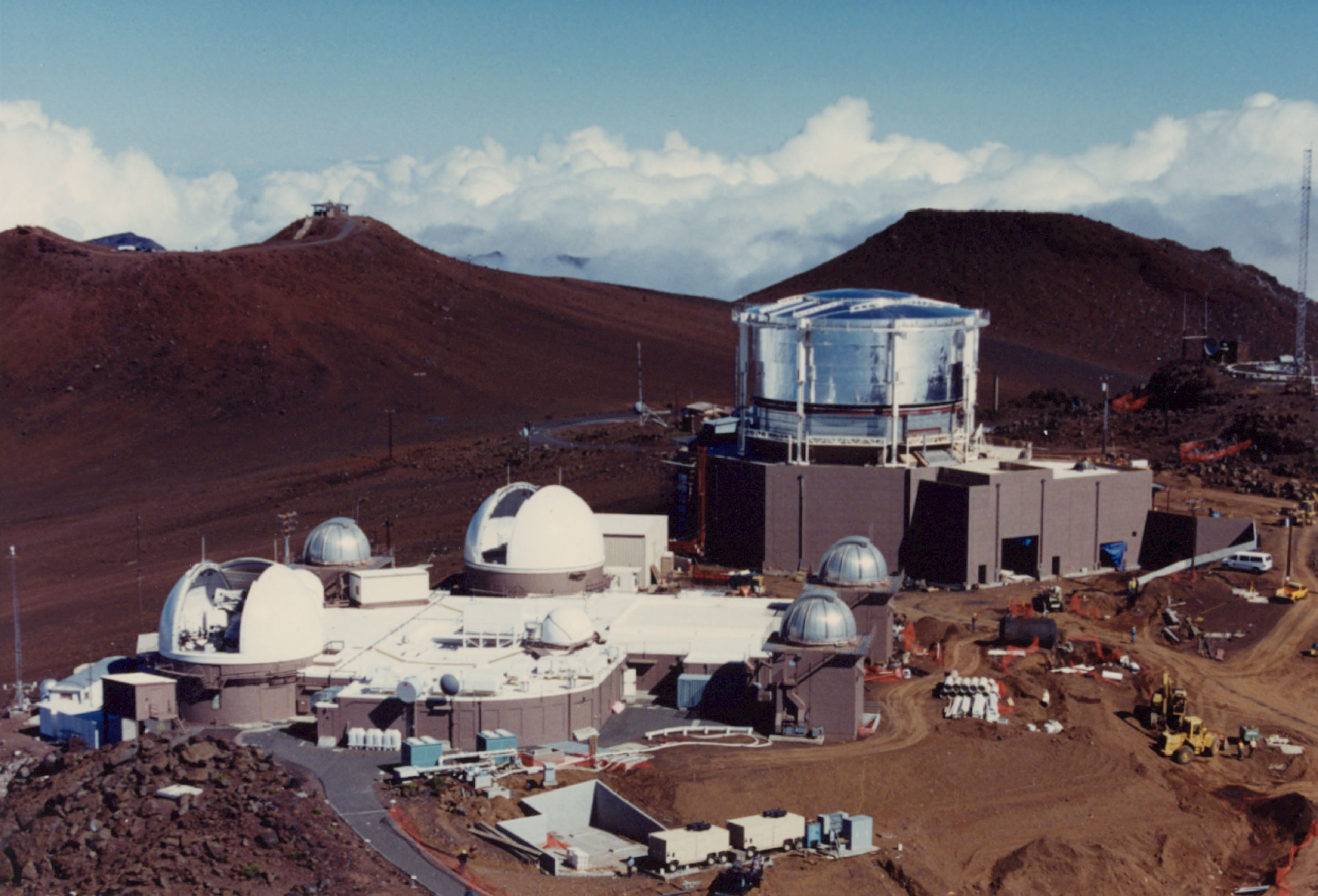
Air Force facilities from the west

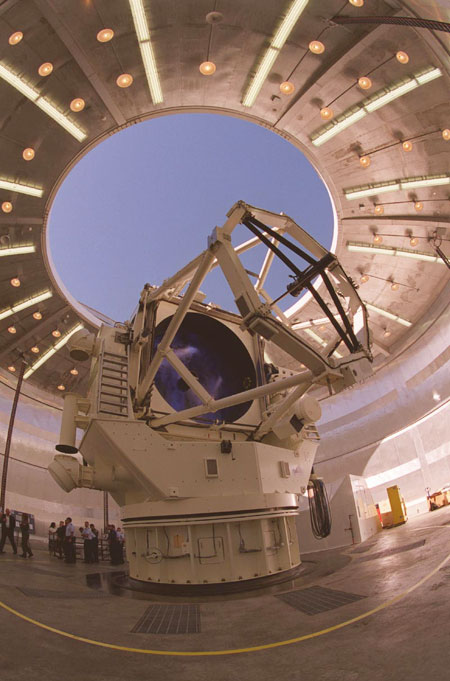
AEOS telescope

== See also ==
- Mauna Kea Observatories
- Mauna Loa Solar Observatory
- List of astronomical observatories
