= National Register of Historic Places listings in Owyhee County, Idaho =

Location of Owyhee County in Idaho

This is a list of the National Register of Historic Places listings in Owyhee County, Idaho.

This is intended to be a complete list of the properties and districts on the National Register of Historic Places in Owyhee County, Idaho, United States. Latitude and longitude coordinates are provided for many National Register properties and districts; these locations may be seen together in a map.

There are 14 properties and districts listed on the National Register in the county. More may be added; properties and districts nationwide are added to the Register weekly.

This National Park Service list is complete through NPS recent listings posted May 1, 2026.

== Current listings ==
	Name on the Register	Image	Date listed	Location	City or town	Description
1	Bernard's Ferry	Bernard's Ferry	May 22, 1978 (#78001090)	North of Murphy off State Highway 78; 43°23′05″N 116°39′53″W	Murphy	
2	Bruneau Episcopal Church	Bruneau Episcopal Church	November 17, 1982 (#82000356)	Off State Highway 51; 42°52′50″N 115°48′03″W	Bruneau	
3	Camas and Pole Creeks Archeological District	Camas and Pole Creeks Archeological District	May 28, 1986 (#86001203)	Address Restricted	Wagon Box Basin	
4	Camp Lyon Site		December 27, 1972 (#72000444)	1 mile east of U.S. Route 95; 43°08′15″N 117°00′57″W	Reynolds	
5	Camp Three Forks		December 15, 1972 (#72000445)	South of Silver City; 42°42′36″N 117°00′45″W	Silver City	
6	Delamar Historic District	Delamar Historic District	May 13, 1976 (#76000679)	6 miles west of Silver City; 43°01′29″N 116°50′31″W	Silver City	A mining ghost town
7	Guffey Butte – Black Butte Archeological District	Guffey Butte – Black Butte Archeological District	October 10, 1978 (#78001038)	Along approximately 34 miles (55 km) of the Snake River in Canyon, Ada, Owyhee, and Elmore counties 43°11′02″N 116°22′46″W	Grand View	
8	James E. and Emma Gusman Ranch		December 9, 1999 (#99001477)	South Mountain Rd. 42°55′41″N 117°00′00″W	Jordan Valley, Oregon, vicinity	
9	Noble Horse Barn	Noble Horse Barn	August 7, 1991 (#91000989)	Reynolds Creek 12 miles southwest of Murphy; 43°13′04″N 116°45′13″W	Murphy	
10	Our Lady, Queen of Heaven Church	Our Lady, Queen of Heaven Church	November 28, 1980 (#80001333)	Oreana Loop Rd. 43°02′25″N 116°23′41″W	Oreana	
11	Owyhee County Courthouse	Owyhee County Courthouse	November 17, 1982 (#82000357)	State Highway 78; 43°13′01″N 116°33′04″W	Murphy	
12	Poison Creek Stage Station	Poison Creek Stage Station	May 22, 1978 (#78001089)	South of Homedale off Jump Creek Rd. 43°30′08″N 116°56′18″W	Homedale	
13	Silver City Historic District	Silver City Historic District	May 19, 1972 (#72000446)	Silver City and its environs 43°01′00″N 116°43′57″W	Silver City	
14	Wickahoney Post Office and Stage Station	Wickahoney Post Office and Stage Station	May 27, 1982 (#82002514)	Wickahoney Creek; 42°27′22″N 115°59′02″W	Wickahoney	

== See also ==
- List of National Historic Landmarks in Idaho
- National Register of Historic Places listings in Idaho
