= Silver City Historic District (Idaho) =

Historic district in Idaho, United States

- U.S. National Register of Historic Places
- U.S. Historic district
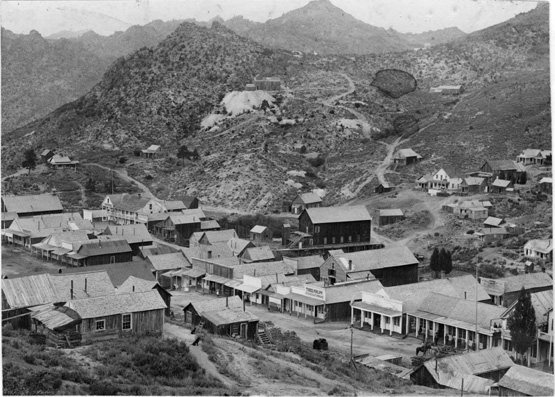
- Silver City in 1892

- Location within Idaho
- Location: Owyhee County, Idaho; United States
- Nearest city: Jordan Valley, Oregon
- Coordinates: 43°01′01″N 116°43′59″W
- Area: 10,240 acres (41.4 km^{2})
- NRHP reference No.: 72000446
- Added to NRHP: May 19, 1972

The Silver City Historic District is a historically significant mining area in northwestern Owyhee County, Idaho, United States. It includes the abandoned town of Silver City and numerous nearby towns, mines, and mining remains, covering approximately 37 square feet. Along with Silver City, it encompasses the communities of Ruby City, Boonsville, Dewey, and Fairvlew, along with major silver mines on War Eagle Mountain and Florida Mountain.

== See also ==
- National Register of Historic Places listings in Owyhee County, Idaho
