= Owyhee County Courthouse =

- U.S. National Register of Historic Places
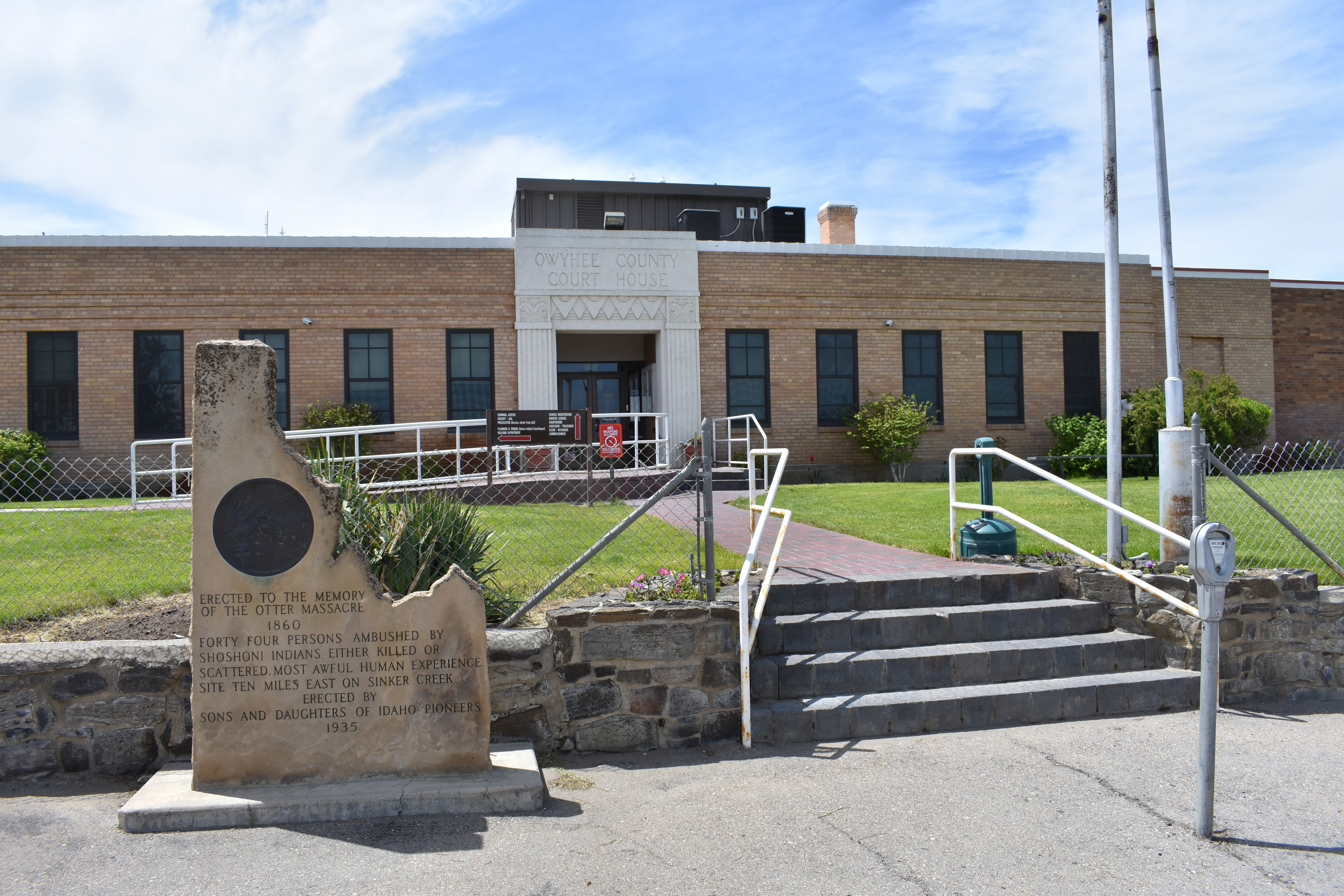
- The Owyhee County Courthouse in 2019

- Location within Idaho Location within the United States
- Location: 20381 State Highway 78, Murphy, Idaho
- Coordinates: 43°13′01″N 116°33′01″W
- Area: less than one acre
- Built: 1936
- Architect: Tourtellotte & Hummel
- Architectural style: Modern Movement, Art deco
- MPS: Tourtellotte and Hummel Architecture TR
- NRHP reference No.: 82000357
- Added to NRHP: November 17, 1982

The Owyhee County Courthouse in Murphy, Idaho, is a 1-story Art Deco building designed by Tourtellotte & Hummel and constructed in 1936. The brick building features a prominent entry with fluted pilasters on either side of a square arch, with foliated sunburst panels that frame an entablature of floral, triangular, and wavelet designs. A panel above the entry reads, "Owyhee County Courthouse." The building was added to the National Register of Historic Places in 1982.

== History ==
Owyhee County was organized in Idaho Territory in 1863, and the county seat was first at Ruby City (1863-1867), then at Silver City (1867-1934), and in 1934 voters moved the county seat to Murphy. The Idaho State Legislature ratified the move in 1999, officially changing the Idaho Code to reflect the relocation from Silver City to Murphy.

In 1936 the county built a new courthouse on what was then a section of State Highway 45, now State Highway 78, at Murphy. A dancehall had been the temporary courthouse, and it burned in 1939.

The Owyhee County Courthouse was renovated and expanded in 1973, with 1-story brick additions at either end of the original structure.

The only parking meter in Owyhee County was installed at the courthouse in the early 1950s.

== See also ==
- Gem County Courthouse
- National Register of Historic Places listings in Owyhee County, Idaho
