= Bernard's Ferry =

- U.S. National Register of Historic Places
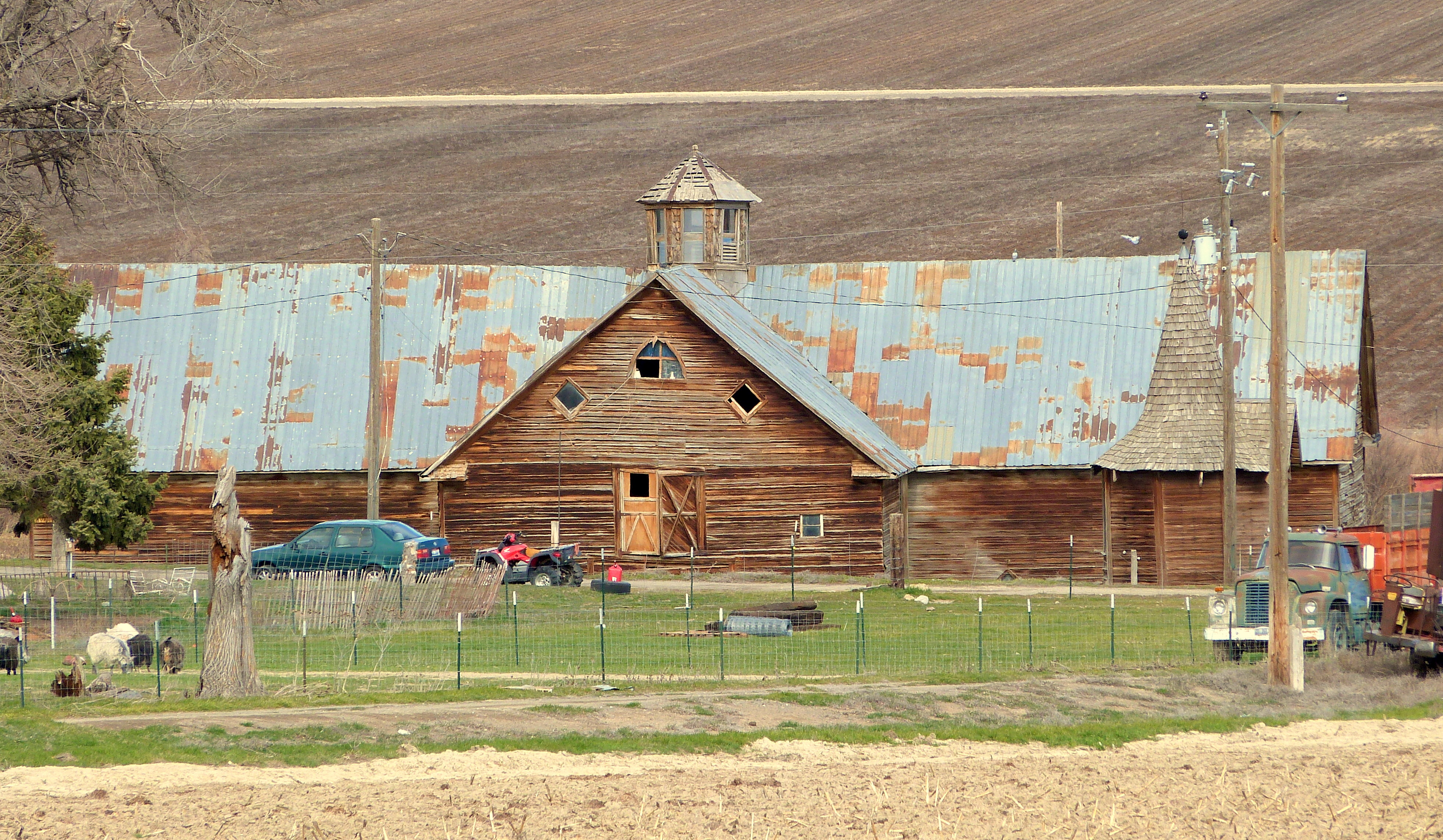
- Bernard's Ferry barn

- Location within Idaho Location within the United States
- Location: North of Murphy, Idaho off State Highway 78
- Coordinates: 43°23′5″N 116°39′49″W
- Area: less than one acre
- Built: 1884
- NRHP reference No.: 78001090
- Added to NRHP: May 22, 1978

Bernard's Ferry is a historic site located on the Snake River north of Murphy off State Highway 78 in Owyhee County, Idaho.

J.C. Bernard began operating a ferry at the site in 1884. He opened a road, utilizing the ferry, between mining town of Silver City and the Oregon Short Line railhead at Caldwell. A hotel and horse barn at this site were built to serve the stagecoach and freight lines which used the road and ferry. Bernard's ventures were successful until a bridge was built at Walter's Ferry in 1920.

The site was listed on the National Register of Historic Places in 1978. The listing includes three contributing buildings, one contributing structure, and one contributing site. The buildings are a horse barn, an octagonal silo, and two outbuildings which are simple gabled stone and frame structures. The barn, a "good late nineteenth century horse barn" was deemed to be "one of the finer stylistic examples of its period in Idaho with its octagonal cupola, gable returns, and diamond windows."
