= The Owyhee Avalanche =

- Type: Weekly newspaper
- Owner(s): Owyhee Publishing
- Publisher: Joe E. Aman
- Managing editor: Jon P. Brown
- Founded: August 19, 1865
- Language: English
- Headquarters: 19 E Idaho Ave, Homedale, Idaho 83628
- Circulation: 1,900
- Website: owyheeavalanche.com

The Owyhee Avalanche is a weekly newspaper in Homedale, Idaho, United States. It was the first paper in the Idaho Territory to publish daily, to have telegraphic service and to print on a steam-powered press. Over a century, the paper has had numerous owners changed the name and relocated to different towns in Owyhee County. The Avalanche has been relaunched at least six times and is descended from or has absorbed other papers including the Tidal Wave, the Nugget, the Leader and the Chronicle.

== History ==
The Owyhee Avalanche was founded in Ruby City, Idaho on August 19, 1865 by J. L. Hardin and brothers John and Joe Wasson. The Wassons bought out Hardin and moved their printing plant to Silver City in 1866. The Wassons sold the paper in 1867 to William John Hill and Henry W. Millard. John McGonigle briefly became the owner in 1868, but resold to Hill and Millard after a few months. The same year, brothers J. S. and Thomas Butler established the Tidal Wave, which failed and was sold after two years to the Avalanche. Hill became the sole owner of the Avalanche in 1870 and he changed the paper's name to the Idaho Avalanche in 1874 when the paper expanded from a weekly to a daily. This made the Avalanche the first daily newspaper in the Idaho Territory. The paper went back to weekly production after two and a half years. In 1876, Hill sold the paper to J. S. Hay. The paper was then sold to Guy Newcomb and Dave Adams in 1880 followed by C. H. Hayes in 1882.

In 1890, the Avalanche printing plant was leased by John Lamb and Lem A. York. A year later the men launched the Owyhee Nugget in De Lamar. In 1897, the Idaho Avalanche was renamed back to the Owyhee Avalanche. The two owners split in 1901. Lamb took the Nugget moved it to Silver City. York ran the Avalanche until 1902. Three years later the Avalanche ceased and the plant was sold to Lamb who absorbed the Avalanche into the Nugget. Later that year the plant was sold again to Jake Horn who relaunched the Avalanche. However, a fire destroyed the plant in 1906 and the paper ceased again. A group of citizens relaunched the Avalanche in 1912. That same year Lamb sold the Nugget to Frank Burrough, who moved it to Bruneau. The Avalanche shuttered for a third time after a few years. Around that time H. B. Jones established the Owyhee Leader in Silver City. Charles A. Hackney bought the Leader from R. W. Magnum in 1921 and soon renamed it to the Avalanche. It ceased in 1932.

In 1931, Charles O. Davis started the Owyhee Chronicle in Homedale. He sold the Chronicle a year later to R. H. Colley. The Nugget was sold to H. W. Gahau followed by Charles Pucoe. In 1939, the Nugget was bought by Rodney and Leona Hawes, who then moved it to Marsing. In 1941, Grace Colley, who succeeded her husband as the Chronicle's owner, passed the paper down to her sons Everett and Kenneth Colley. Over the years ownership bounced between Everett Colley and others briefly. He leased the Chronicle to Elwood Gough in 1952, sold it in 1966 to Tom Mills and then sold it again in 1975 to Joe Aman. In 1965, historian Jim Spencer relaunched the Owyhee Avalanche. The paper faced financial hardship and ceased by 1975. In 1980, the Hawes put the Nugget up for sale, and sold it in 1982 to Mick and Kyle Hodges. In 1985, Aman purchased the Owyhee Nugget from the Hodges and merged it with his Owyhee Chronicle to reform the Owyhee Avalanche.
