= Little Joe Monahan =

American cattle rancher

Joe Monahan
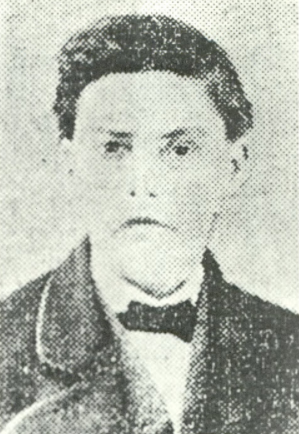
- "Little Joe" Monahan, previously Johanna Monahan, published in a Buffalo newspaper upon their death in 1904
- Born: Johanna Monahan; 1850; Buffalo, New York, U.S.
- Died: 1904 (aged 53–54)
- Occupation: Businessperson

Joe "Little Joe" Monahan (1850–1904), born Johanna Monahan, was an American businessman who worked in various prospecting and cattle industries around Silver City, Idaho, under an assumed masculine name and identity. The revelation of Joe's sex became a sensationalized national news story after his death in 1904. His life was the subject of the 1993 film The Ballad of Little Jo.

== Early life ==
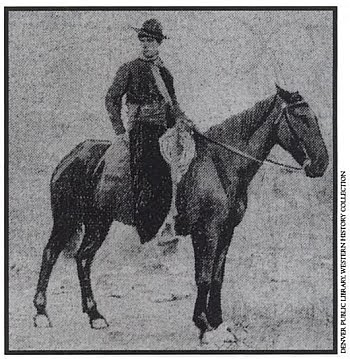
"Little Joe Monahan," born Johanna Monahan, c. 1870s

Monahan is believed to have been born as Johanna Monahan in Buffalo, New York, in 1850, and to have moved to Idaho in 1867. Raised in a foster home from the age of eight, Monahan left for the West at 14 years old. Because his identity was obscured until his death in 1904, the circumstances of his birth are unclear, and census records suggest he may have been born as Mary Manumon, though the family also had a young servant girl, Johanna Burke. Accounts to journalists after his death claimed that Monahan's mother dressed the young child in boy's clothing in early childhood to sell newspapers on the street.

== As Joe Monahan ==
Monahan had spent his early years in Idaho as a cowboy, and briefly lived in Oregon before returning to Owyhee County, where an 1898 directory listed him as a cattle rancher. Monahan was said to have worked in the livery business, then a sawmill, and later saved several thousand dollars in mining, which were stolen in an investment fraud. Monahan voted in an 1880 Republican primary despite women being denied the vote at the time.

Monahan lived on Succor Creek, near Silver City, in a small home with dirt floors, raising pigs and chickens. He is listed in three Idaho census inquiries. All identified Monahan as a male, with one marked with an asterisk with the remark "doubtful sex." Locals remarked that they were aware that Monahan was female, but Monahan never confirmed it when questioned, and the issue was rarely raised. In a letter to the Buffalo police chief seeking next of kin, a local resident remarked that, "He had fought his way through with many of us ... suffered hardship and hunger in early days and never whimpered ... the cowboys treated him with the greatest respect, and he was always welcome to eat and sleep at their camps."

Monahan fell ill in 1903 after a winter cattle drive on the Boise River and died in 1904. At this point, townspeople discovered his sex, which was widely reported in the media of the day including an exposé in the American Journal Examiner.

== Media ==
Monahan's story became a popular story in Western magazines starting in the 1950s. Barbara Lebow wrote a play, Little Joe Monaghan, in 1981. In 1993, a movie, The Ballad of Little Jo, was released, loosely based on Monahan's life story.
