= Ruby City, Idaho =

Ghost town in Idaho, United States

Coordinates: 43°01′34″N 116°43′58″W

Ruby City, Owehee Discrict, Idaho (illustration by A. Waud, c. 1867)

Ruby City is a ghost town in Owyhee County, Idaho, United States. It was located along Jordan Creek about a mile below Silver City.

Ruby City was a mining town settled in November 1863. The town was the first county seat of Owyhee County and was born to serve the rich mines in the vicinity. The Owyhee Avalanche, first newspaper in Owyhee County, started in Ruby City in 1865, but was moved to nearby Silver City just over a year later. The post office, which opened in 1864, closed in 1867. In 1867, the county seat was also moved to Silver City, along with the better buildings and the end was in sight for Ruby City.

Nowadays, only remains of a cemetery mark the town's location.

== In popular culture ==
The 1993 Western film The Ballad of Little Jo was set in Ruby City, Idaho, where Jo Monaghan eventually settles down.

== See also ==
- List of ghost towns in Idaho
