= Ellen Trueblood =

American Mycologist

- Born: August 1, 1911; Boise, Idaho, U.S.
- Died: May 17, 1994 (aged 82)
- Spouses: R. Lynn Michaelson (m. 1929–1936) Ted Trueblood (m. 1936)
- Children: 3

Ellen Trueblood (born Ellen Hinkson; August 1, 1911 – May 17, 1994) was an American mycologist and environmental advocate known for her significant contributions to the field of mycology, particularly in the Southern Idaho region.

== Early life and career ==
Ellen Trueblood was born on August 1, 1911, in Boise, Idaho, to Cyrus Hinkson and Rosella Blunk Hinkson. She attended the Cole School and later Boise High School, where she engaged in journalism by contributing to the student newspaper, The Pepper Box. Following her graduation in 1929, she married R. Lynn Michaelson, the son of the owner of the Caldwell, Idaho News Tribune, launching her career in journalism. Aside from the News Tribune, Ellen Trueblood also wrote for the Boise Capital News, the Nampa Free Press, and various freelance projects.

In 1936, after the birth of her child and subsequent divorce from Michaelson, Ellen Trueblood married Ted Trueblood, with whom she shared a passion for the outdoors and photography. Their shared interests led them to spend their honeymoon in the Idaho wilderness in 1939, sparking Ellen Trueblood's deepening interest in the study and conservation of the natural world. The Truebloods had two sons, Dan and Jack.

== Contributions to mycology ==
During the 1950s, Trueblood went on a series of backcountry trips with her husbands and sons, where she began to learn about and identify mushrooms. Through self-study, foraging, and mycology classes at the University of Idaho, she honed her skills, eventually studying under Dr. Alexander Smith and becoming a leading figure in mycology in the Southern Idaho region. She was especially interested in exploring the diverse Owyhee region, completing surveys of the area and contributing to academic journals.

Trueblood is credited with the discovery of 20 new fungi species, many of which are detailed in her collection of papers, “Notes on Fungi of the Owyhee Region”.

Some of her discoveries include:

- Calvatia booniana, named for Dr. William Judson Boone
- Calvatia packardae, named after Dr. Patricia L. Packard
- Calvatia impolita, found while relieving herself
- Amanita armillariiformis species
- Amanita aurantisquamosa
- Amanita malheurensis
- Hygrophorus ellenae and Rhizopogon ellenae, named by Dr. Smith in her honor
- Leccinum truebloodii, named for her husband

In the 1970s, she helped Smith Kline & French Laboratories research fungi as chemotherapeutic agents. Trueblood was respected, even outside the mycological community. Once, Trueblood was called to a hospital after the intake of six people who had ingested poisonous mushrooms. She was able to use her knowledge to identify the specimen. They were able to give the proper medicine, saving the lives of the people.

== Legacy and recognition ==
Ellen Trueblood's contributions to mycology were widely recognized. She joined the North American Mycological Association (NAMA) in 1960, later becoming the Western Vice-president. For her contributions, she received the NAMA Award for Contributions to Amateur Mycology in 1982 and the 1996 NAMA Memorial Scholarship was given in her name. In 1976, Trueblood founded the Southern Idaho Mycological Association (SIMA), which honored her for "Years of Outstanding Contributions to the Mycology of Idaho" in 1984.

Following the death of her husband in 1982, Trueblood continued to advocate for environmental conservation issues, particularly in wilderness designation. Her extensive collection of 6500 mushroom specimens was donated to the University of Michigan Herbarium. Her papers and photographs are housed at Boise State University where she previously taught.

Ellen Trueblood died in Seattle on May 17, 1994, after battling Alzheimer's disease.
