= Bruneau Episcopal Church =

Historic church in Idaho, United States

- U.S. National Register of Historic Places
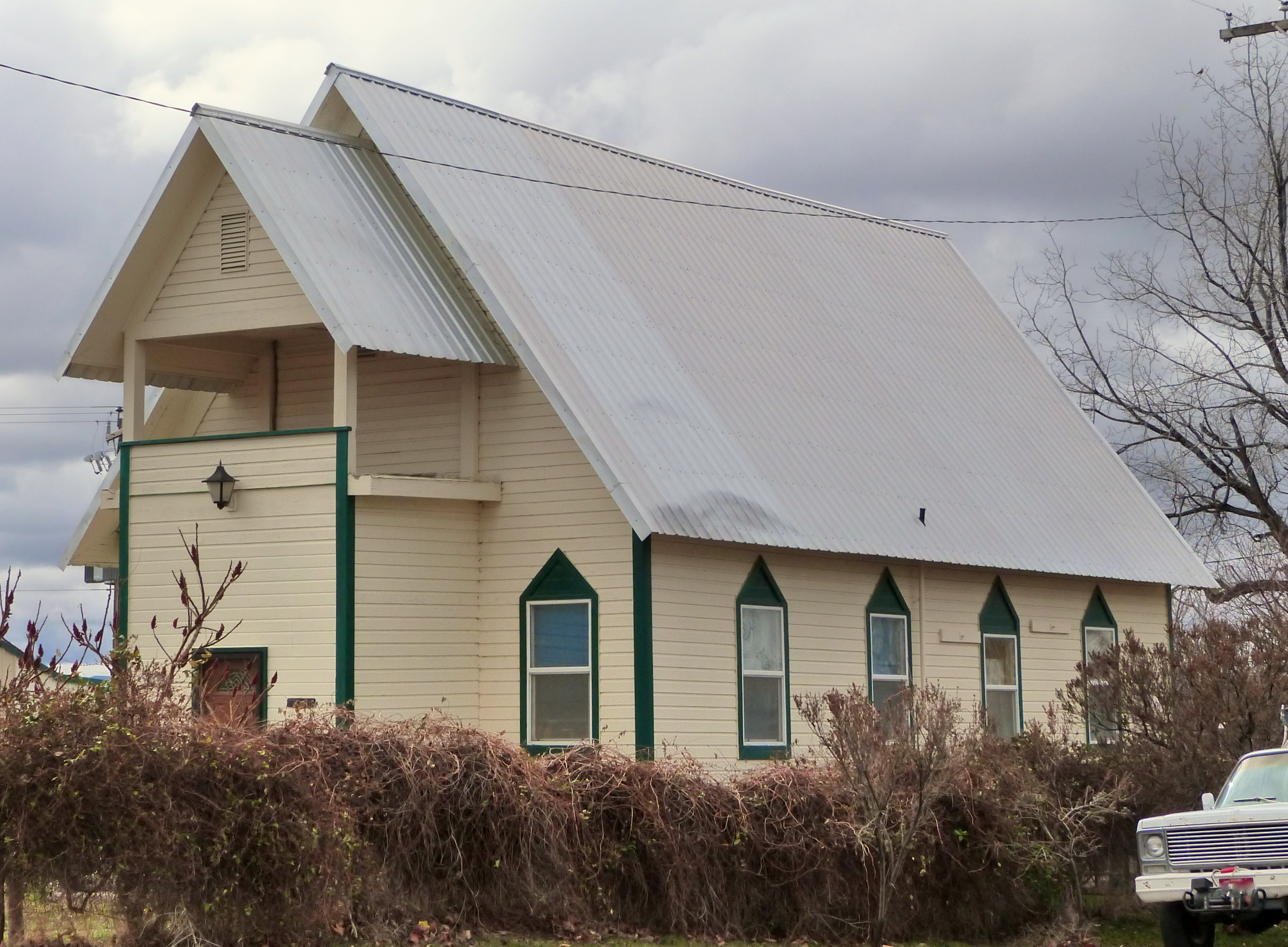

- Location within Idaho Location within the United States
- Location: Off State Highway 51, Bruneau, Idaho
- Coordinates: 42°52′51″N 115°47′51″W
- Area: less than one acre
- Built: 1911
- Architect: Tourtellotte & Hummel
- MPS: Tourtellotte and Hummel Architecture TR
- NRHP reference No.: 82000356
- Added to NRHP: November 17, 1982

The Bruneau Episcopal Church is a historic church located off State Highway 51 on the south side of Bruneau in Owyhee County, Idaho.

It is a shiplap-sided frame building with an outset gable-roofed porch/belfry. It was designed by Tourtellotte & Hummel. Gothic-style is alluded to by lancet-type windows.

The church was built in approximately 1912 at the impetus of the area's women who raised the funds for its construction.

== See also ==
- National Register of Historic Places listings in Owyhee County, Idaho
