= William J. Hill =

Canadian-American newspaper publisher (1840–1918)

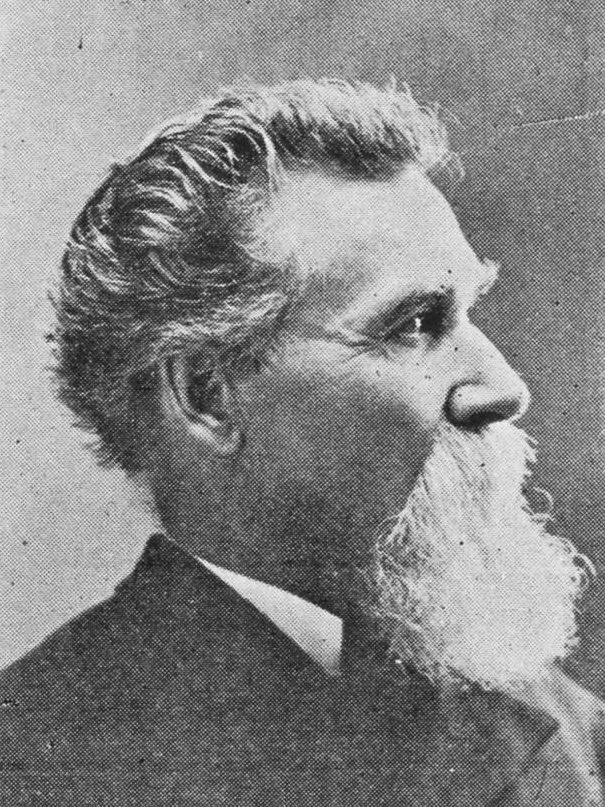
- Hill c. 1915

Member of the California Senate from the 6th district
- In office January 5, 1880 – January 8, 1883
- Preceded by: Thomas Flint
- Succeeded by: Benjamin Knight

Mayor of Salinas
- In office 1898
- In office 1886–1892

Personal details
- Born: March 3, 1840 Prescott, Upper Canada
- Died: February 14, 1918 (aged 77) Salinas, California, U.S.
- Party: Republican
- Other political affiliations: New Constitution (1879); Workingmen's (1879)
- Spouse: Isabella Amelia Peck
- Children: William
- Occupation: Prospector, ferryman, newspaper publisher, politician
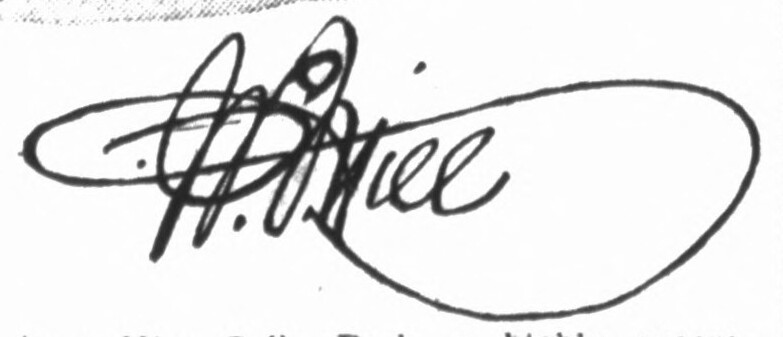
- Signature

William J. Hill (March 3, 1840 – February 14, 1918) was a Canadian American prospector, ferryman, newspaper publisher, and politician. He published the first daily newspaper in Idaho, the Idaho Daily Avalanche, in 1876. He was also the publisher of the California Salinas Index. Hill was a California state senator from 1880 to 1883 and mayor of Salinas, California from 1886 to 1892 and again in 1898.

== Early life ==
Hill was born in Prescott, Upper Canada (now Ontario) in 1840 to John Hill and Elizabeth Smades, the eldest of thirteen children.

John Hill, born in Lochmaben, Dumfries-shire, Scotland, and Elizabeth Smades, born in Prescott, Upper Canada (now Ontario), were married about 1835. John Hill died at the age of 80 by drowning. When Elizabeth Samdes died, she was described in her obituary as an "old pioneer of Augusta" New York.

At 22, Hill travelled to British Columbia, then a British colony, via the Panama Canal, to prospect for gold. This prospecting took him to Alaska and Idaho, where he founded Hill's Ferry on the Owyhee River "at the junction of the Chico road from California, and the Humboldt road from Nevada," which operated from 1865 to 1867.

== Massacre of Indigenous peoples ==
In the 1860s, relations between the Indigenous people of the Owyhee and the settlers was frayed. The U.S. government reneged on its promises regarding Indigenous people of the region and their land, the Paitue people, in their joint treaties. White settlers began invading the area as well as prospectors against the terms of the treaties. This resulted in conflict between the two groups, with several atrocities being committed on both sides.

In 1866, US troops fought with Paiute warriors in what is called the Battle of Owyhee River, with one casualty and one wounded among the US troops. It was reported the 30 Paiute warriors were killed.

Around this time, it was reported, Hill and a group of 150 white settlers massacred 100 Indigenous people, with one death among the settlers. Hill was claimed to have been "shot through the left thigh." For this, Hill gained the sobriquet "Old Hill."

== Political career ==
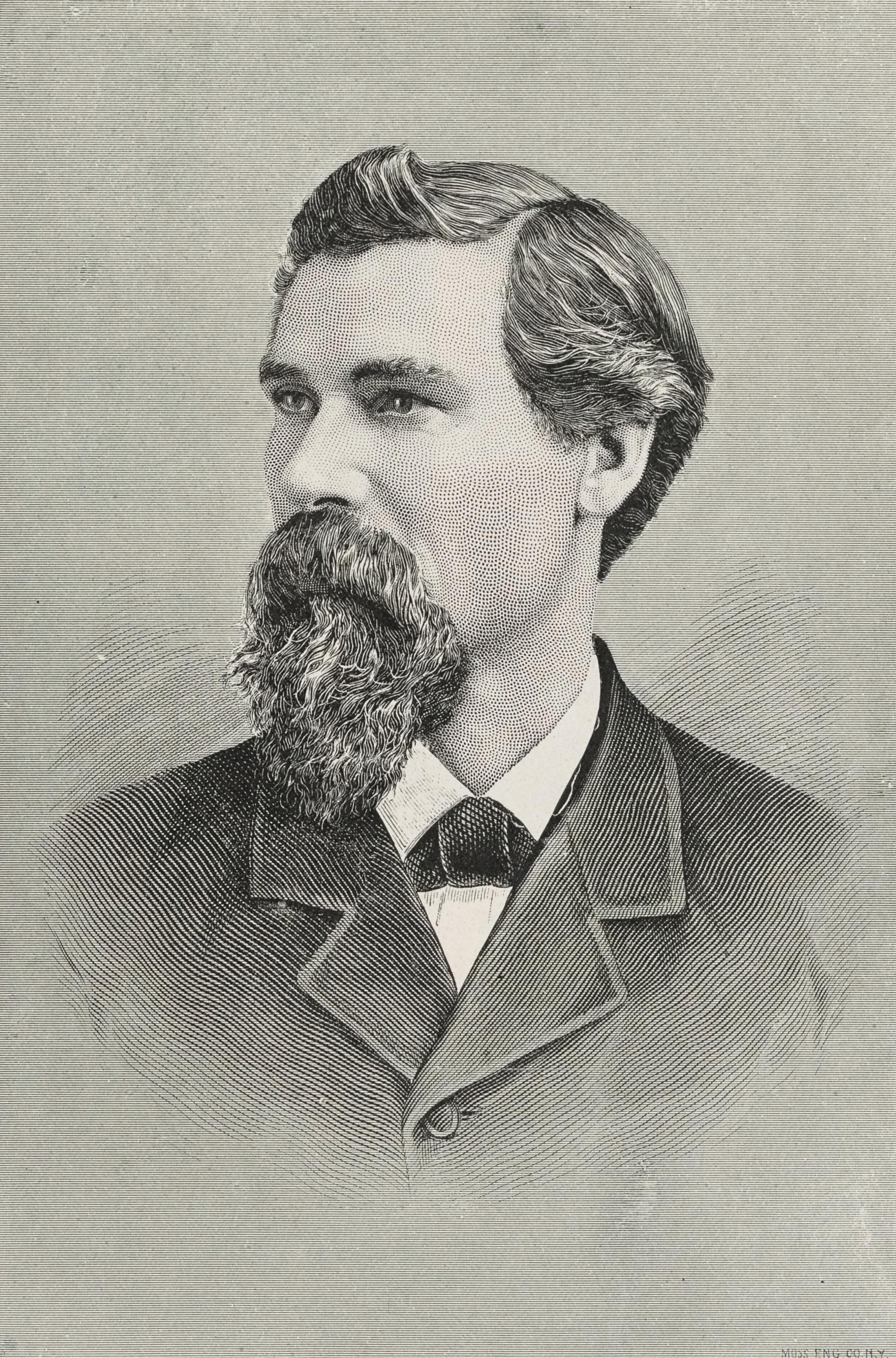
Engraving of Hill c. 1889

Hill began his political career in Silver City, Idaho Territory in the 1870s, where he was elected "County Clerk, Sheriff, and Tax Collector."

Hill was elected to the California State Senate in 1879 on a Republican-New Constitution Fusion ticket (in addition to support from the Workingmen's Party of California), representing Monterrey, San Benito, and Santa Cruz counties in the 23rd (1880) and 24th (1881) sessions. Although the State Senate's official record lists him as a member of the Workingmen's Party, newspaper accounts indicate he remained in the Republican Party during this time.

Hill served three terms as mayor of Salinas, California, USA, in 1886-92 and 1898. He was postmaster at Salinas from 1902 to 1915.

== Newspaper publisher ==
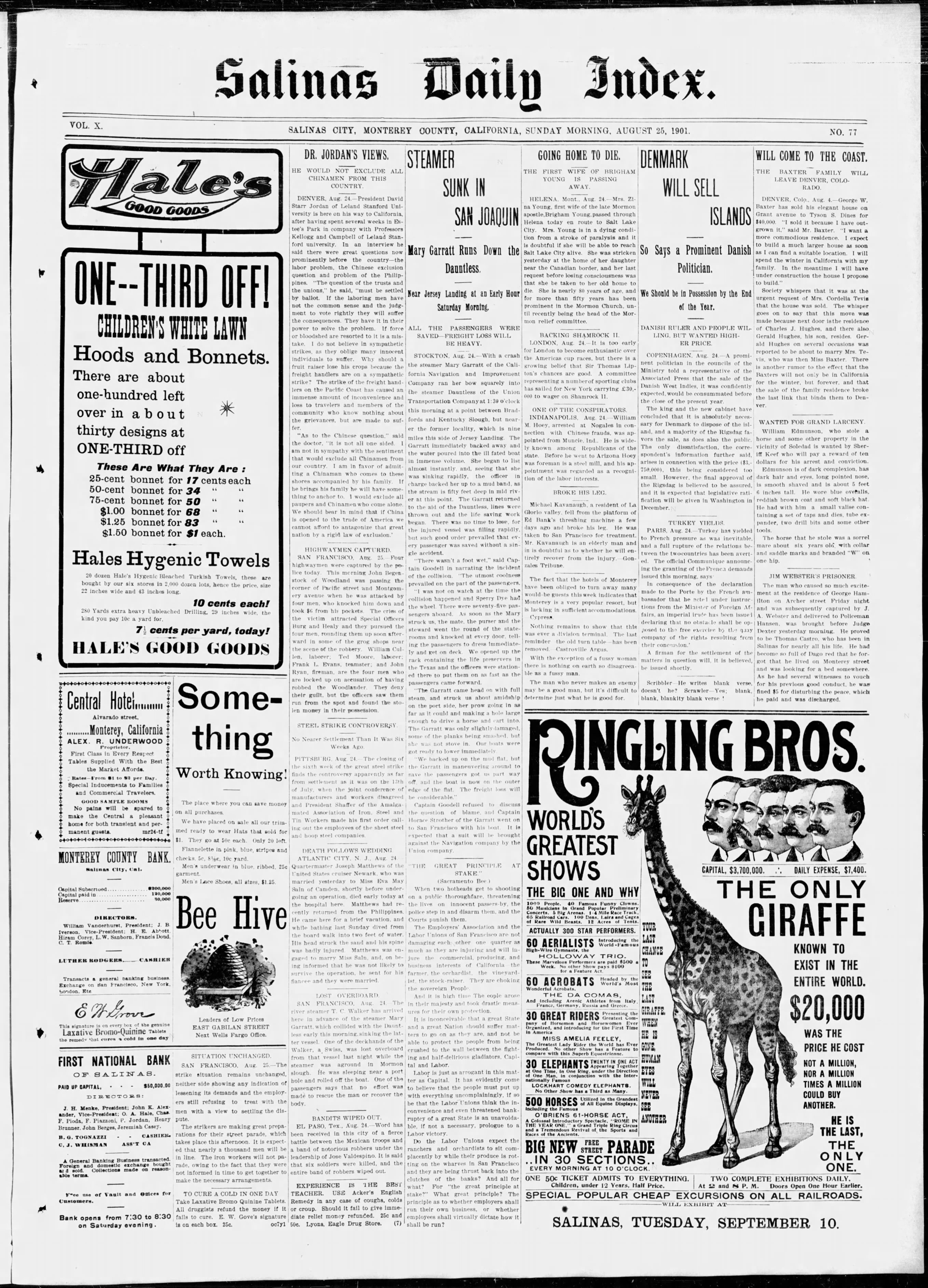
Front page of the Salinas Daily Index for Sunday, August 25, 1901

In 1875, in Silver CIty, Idaho Territory, USA, Hill purchased the Owyhee Avalanche, remaking it the Idaho Daily Avalanche, in 1876, as the first daily newspaper in Idaho. He later turned the paper into a weekly, renamed the Idaho Weekly Avalanche. He sold the paper in 1876, which continued to be published until 1897 as The Idaho Avalanche. The paper continues, published as The Owyhee Avalanche.

In 1876, Hill took over the publication of The Salinas Daily Index. In a retrospective of his work, he is quoted writing at the time,

It having already been announced in these columns that I had purchased [in 1876] the INDEX establishment with the view of making Salinas City my permanent home… I have selected Salinas City as the place to pitch my tent, and have come to stay…I hope to be able to aid materially in developing, building up and promoting the best interests of this city and valley, as well as the county at large.

...

I have now on the way hither, and it will arrive inside of two weeks, about 12,000 pounds of printing material and machinery among which are a handsome little steam engine and a cylinder press. When I get my office fitted up to suit me, which will be in the course of three or four weeks, Salinas City will be able to boast of the best, the most extensive, and complete newspaper, book and job printing establishment in the State south of San Francisco.

The office for the paper was "conveniently located...on the first floor of Ball & Frank's fine brick building, a few steps north of the Abbott House." The paper continues to be published as The Salinas Californian.

In 1885, Hill purchased a weekly publication, The Salinas City Index, at Salinas City, Monterrey County, California, USA, which he continued to publish as The Salinas Weekly Index until 1895.

== Family and death ==
In 1873, he and Arabella Amelia (Belle) Peck married in Silver City, Idaho, USA. They had one child, William Charles Hill, born in 1874.

Hill died of uremia on February 14, 1918, in Salinas.
