= Reynolds, Idaho =

Unincorporated community in the state of Idaho, United States

- Unincorporated community
- Location within Idaho Location within the United States
- Coordinates: 43°12′05″N 116°44′39″W
- Country: United States
- State: Idaho
- County: Owyhee
- Elevation: 3,930 ft (1,200 m)
- Time zone: UTC-7 (Mountain (MST))
  - Summer (DST): UTC-6 (MDT)
- Area codes: 208, 986
- GNIS feature ID: 398039

Reynolds is an unincorporated community in Owyhee County, Idaho, United States. Reynolds is 9.8 miles (15.8 km) west of Murphy.

The Camp Lyon Site, which is listed on the National Register of Historic Places, is located near Reynolds.

== Climate ==
According to the Köppen Climate Classification system, Reynolds has a warm-summer mediterranean climate, abbreviated "Csb" on climate maps. The hottest temperature recorded in Reynolds was 107 °F (41.7 °C) on July 13, 2002, while the coldest temperature recorded was −24 °F (−31.1 °C) on January 22, 1962.

Climate data for Reynolds, Idaho, 1991–2020 normals, extremes 1961–2014
Month	Jan	Feb	Mar	Apr	May	Jun	Jul	Aug	Sep	Oct	Nov	Dec	Year
Record high °F (°C)	62 (17)	70 (21)	78 (26)	87 (31)	97 (36)	102 (39)	107 (42)	105 (41)	98 (37)	93 (34)	77 (25)	63 (17)	107 (42)
Mean maximum °F (°C)	53.8 (12.1)	57.1 (13.9)	67.1 (19.5)	77.3 (25.2)	86.1 (30.1)	94.0 (34.4)	99.3 (37.4)	98.0 (36.7)	91.4 (33.0)	81.7 (27.6)	65.8 (18.8)	54.8 (12.7)	100.2 (37.9)
Mean daily maximum °F (°C)	39.4 (4.1)	43.3 (6.3)	51.7 (10.9)	58.0 (14.4)	67.6 (19.8)	76.2 (24.6)	87.1 (30.6)	85.9 (29.9)	75.7 (24.3)	61.8 (16.6)	47.5 (8.6)	38.7 (3.7)	61.1 (16.2)
Daily mean °F (°C)	30.0 (−1.1)	33.1 (0.6)	39.9 (4.4)	45.0 (7.2)	53.6 (12.0)	60.8 (16.0)	70.1 (21.2)	68.7 (20.4)	59.6 (15.3)	47.5 (8.6)	36.0 (2.2)	29.2 (−1.6)	47.8 (8.8)
Mean daily minimum °F (°C)	20.5 (−6.4)	23.0 (−5.0)	28.0 (−2.2)	32.1 (0.1)	39.6 (4.2)	45.4 (7.4)	53.1 (11.7)	51.6 (10.9)	43.5 (6.4)	33.1 (0.6)	24.6 (−4.1)	19.8 (−6.8)	34.5 (1.4)
Mean minimum °F (°C)	4.7 (−15.2)	7.6 (−13.6)	17.1 (−8.3)	21.5 (−5.8)	27.3 (−2.6)	34.3 (1.3)	41.6 (5.3)	40.9 (4.9)	29.8 (−1.2)	19.8 (−6.8)	10.0 (−12.2)	2.3 (−16.5)	−2.6 (−19.2)
Record low °F (°C)	−24 (−31)	−13 (−25)	−2 (−19)	12 (−11)	20 (−7)	27 (−3)	32 (0)	32 (0)	19 (−7)	11 (−12)	−7 (−22)	−22 (−30)	−24 (−31)
Average precipitation inches (mm)	1.13 (29)	0.82 (21)	1.03 (26)	0.91 (23)	1.44 (37)	0.81 (21)	0.33 (8.4)	0.27 (6.9)	0.35 (8.9)	0.69 (18)	0.95 (24)	1.18 (30)	9.91 (253.2)
Average precipitation days (≥ 0.01 in)	10.6	8.5	9.7	9.3	9.4	6.6	3.8	2.2	2.8	5.6	9.3	11.0	88.8
Source 1: NOAA
Source 2: National Weather Service (mean maxima/minima 1981–2010)
