= Claytonia, Idaho =

Unincorporated community in the state of Idaho, United States

- Unincorporated community
- Location within the state of Idaho Claytonia, Idaho (the United States)
- Coordinates: 43°34′03″N 116°49′59″W
- Country: United States
- State: Idaho
- County: Owyhee
- Elevation: 2,254 ft (687 m)
- Time zone: UTC-7 (Mountain (MST))
  - Summer (DST): UTC-6 (MDT)
- ZIP codes: 83639
- Area codes: 208, 986
- GNIS feature ID: 396299

Claytonia is an unincorporated community in Owyhee County in the southwestern part of the U.S. state of Idaho.

The community is located less than 2 mi (3.2 km) northwest of Marsing and 13 mi (21 km) west of Nampa. The Snake River flows east of the settlement.

== History ==
Claytonia was named for an early resident.

Irrigation was brought to the area in 1913, and settlement followed. Many stores were opened in the area, though only the store in Claytonia "stayed open for a decent amount of time".

A post office operated in Claytonia from 1914 to 1918.

Claytonia was a station along the "Homedale, Idaho" branch of the Union Pacific Railroad. The line is now abandoned. The railway operated a gravel pit in Claytonia, with the gravel used for track construction. The gravel pit was abandoned, and later reclaimed as a recreational area filled with ground and ditch water, and called Claytonia Pond. The pond is used as a fish habitat, and contains catfish, bluegill, and largemouth bass.
