= Niles Fulwyler =

United States Army general

Niles J. Fulwyler
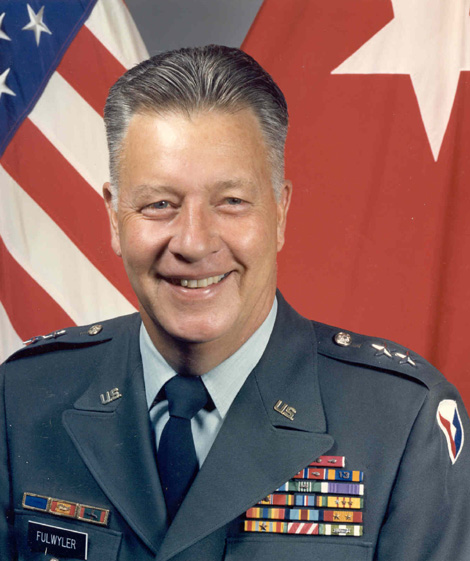
- Born: 13 November 1928; Homedale, Idaho
- Died: 11 January 2014 (aged 85); Meridian, Idaho
- Burial place: Idaho State Veterans Cemetery
- Military career
- Allegiance: United States of America
- Branch: United States Army
- Service years: 1952–1986
- Rank: Major General
- Conflicts: Vietnam War: Operation Apache Snow; Easter Offensive
- Awards: Defense Distinguished Service Medal; Army Distinguished Service Medal; Legion of Merit; Distinguished Flying Cross; Bronze Star Medal; Air Medal; Defense Meritorious Service Medal; Purple Heart

Niles J. Fulwyler (13 November 1928 – 11 January 2014) was a United States Army major general who served as Commanding General of the White Sands Missile Range from 1982 to 1986.

== Biography ==
Niles J. Fulwyler was born on a ranch in Homedale, Idaho, on 13 November 1928, the son of Niles and Mary Fulwyler. His father died in 1936, and his mother married Clarence Hone, and the family moved to Bellefontaine, Ohio. He entered Bowling Green State University, from which he received a Bachelor of Science degree in Political Science in 1952. He served with the ROTC there, becoming a cadet battalion commander in 1952. He was one of three cadets that year to receive Regular Army commissions; another 33 cadets in that year received reserve commissions.

On graduation, Fulwyler joined the United States Army, and was commissioned as a second lieutenant in the field artillery, and served with the United States Army's first guided missile units. He attended the Field Artillery School and Infantry School, and in 1962 was selected to attend the American University in Washington, D.C., from which he earned a Master of Arts degree in International Relations in 1964.

Fulwyler attended the United States Army Command and General Staff College, and served as a staff officer, first with the United Nations Command in Korea, and then with the Department of the Army in Washington, D.C. He attended the United States Army War College, and then joined the 101st Airborne Division for a combat tour in South Vietnam as an artillery battalion commander during the Vietnam War. He was wounded in the fighting in the A Shau Valley. During a second tour of South Vietnam in 1972 he served as a staff officer with the South Vietnamese III Corps. As such, he helped coordinate United States air support that helped turn the tide of the North Vietnamese Easter Offensive.

After the conclusion of his second tour of Vietnam, Fulwyler returned to Washington, D.C., where he served in the Office of the Chief of Staff of the Army, and then the Office of the Assistant Secretary of Defense, where he was involved in discussions with the Soviet Union on reducing forces in Europe. He then served with the Foreign Service Institute. He was Chief of the Nuclear Activities Branch at Supreme Headquarters Allied Powers Europe, and Director of the Nuclear and Chemical Directorate in the Office of the Deputy Chief of Staff of the Army for Operations and Plans.

On 24 September 1982, Fulwyler became the 16th Commander of the White Sands Missile Range. He established a launch complex at Mountain Home, Idaho. He took a particular interest in the history of the Range. He directed the restoration of the White Sands V-2 Launching Site, and acquired funding from the Department of Energy and the Army for the National Park Service to completely restore the McDonald Ranch House,. where the plutonium hemispheres for the pit of the Trinity nuclear test bomb were assembled. He also led volunteers in cleaning up Burn Lake in Las Cruces, New Mexico, and laying sod for the Albert Johnson Memorial Park there.

Fulwyler retired from the Army in 1986, and moved to Santa Fe, New Mexico, where he became a consultant to the Los Alamos National Laboratory. He returned to Idaho in 2001 to be closer to his family. He died of natural causes at his home in Meridian, Idaho, on 11 January 2014, and was buried in the Idaho State Veterans Cemetery with full military honors. He was survived by his nephews and nieces.

Fulwyler's decorations included the Defense Distinguished Service Medal, the Army Distinguished Service Medal, the Legion of Merit, the Distinguished Flying Cross, the Bronze Star Medal, the Air Medal, the Defense Meritorious Service Medal and the Purple Heart Medal. He was inducted into the White Sands Missile Range Hall of Fame in 1996. In June 2014, the Headquarters Building at the White Sands Missile Range was named in his honor. A scholarship was established in his name at Bowling Green State University for undergraduates serving in the ROTC.
