= David Chung (actor) =

Korean-American actor

- Born: September 6, 1946; Seoul, Korea
- Died: April 14, 2006 (age 59); Topanga, California, U.S.

David Chung (September 6, 1946 – April 14, 2006) was a Korean-American actor. He was nominated for an Independent Spirit Award for his performance in the 1993 film The Ballad of Little Jo.

== Filmography ==
Year	Title	Role	Notes
1984	Repo Man	Sheriff	
1984	Ninja III: The Domination	Black Ninja	
1985	Missing in Action 2: The Beginning	Dou Chou	
1986	Out of Bounds	Detective #3	
1987	Walker	Lui	
1989	Criminal Act	Sailor	
1993	The Ballad of Little Jo	Tinman Wong	
1996	Color of a Brisk and Leaping Day	Mr. Lee	
1997	Paradise Road	The Interpreter	
1997	Cold Night Into Dawn	Huang	
2000	Rave	Sung-Un	
2001	Falling Like This	Officer at Station, Dead End	
