= Noble Horse Barn =

- U.S. National Register of Historic Places
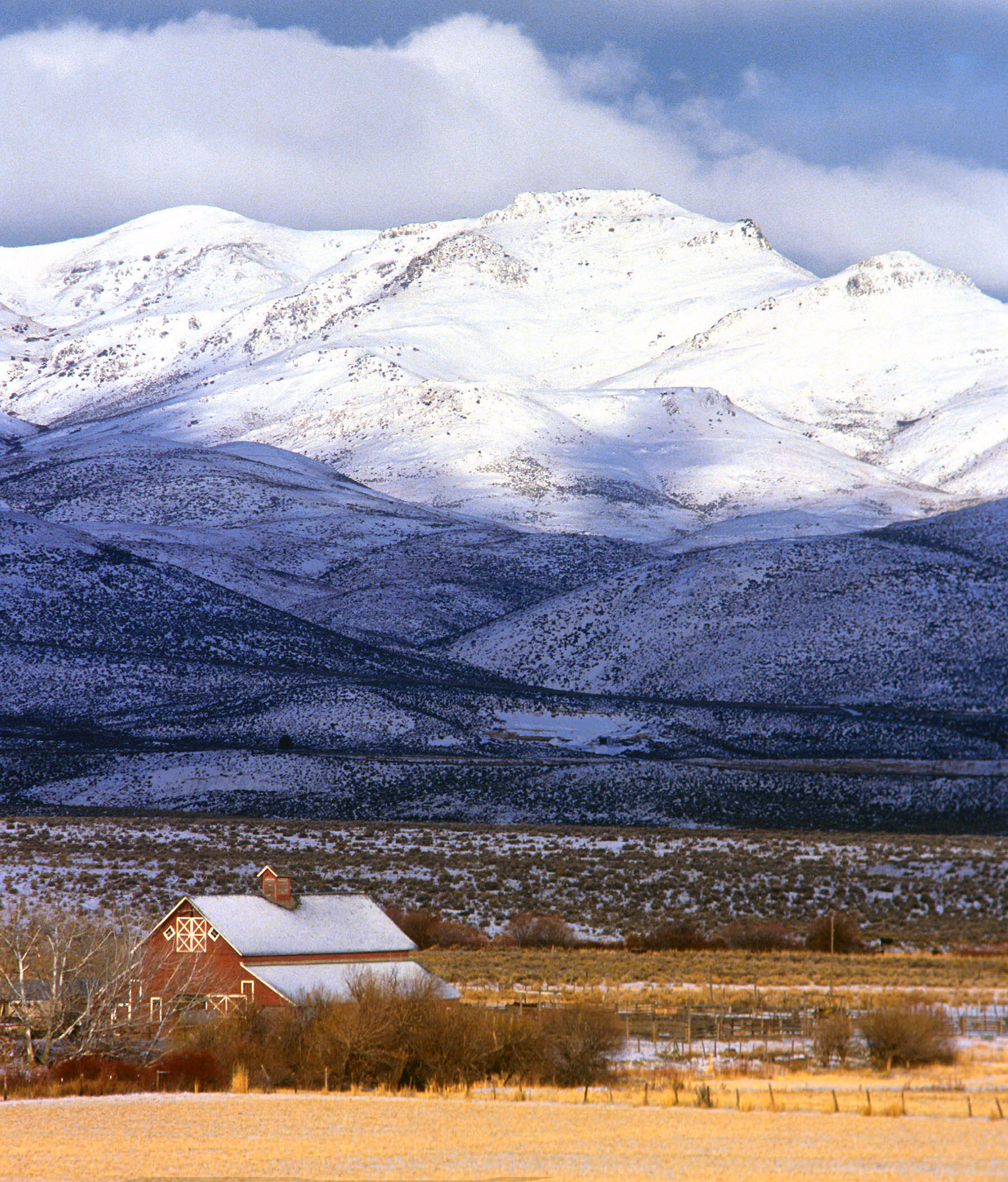

- Location within Idaho Location within the United States
- Location: Reynolds Creek 12 miles southwest of Murphy, Idaho
- Coordinates: 43°13′3″N 116°45′7″W
- Area: less than one acre
- Built: c.1898
- Architectural style: Horse barn
- NRHP reference No.: 91000989
- Added to NRHP: August 7, 1991

The Noble Horse Barn, also known as Bass Barn, in the area of Murphy, Idaho was built before 1898. It was listed on the National Register of Historic Places in 1991.

It is a two-story horse barn with a gable-roofed central block braced by shed-roof lean-to's on either side. It is 65 by 75 feet (20 m × 23 m) in plan and 65 feet (20 m) high.
