= McDonald Ranch House =

Historic house in New Mexico, United States

- U.S. National Register of Historic Places
- U.S. National Historic Landmark District – Contributing property
- NM State Register of Cultural Properties
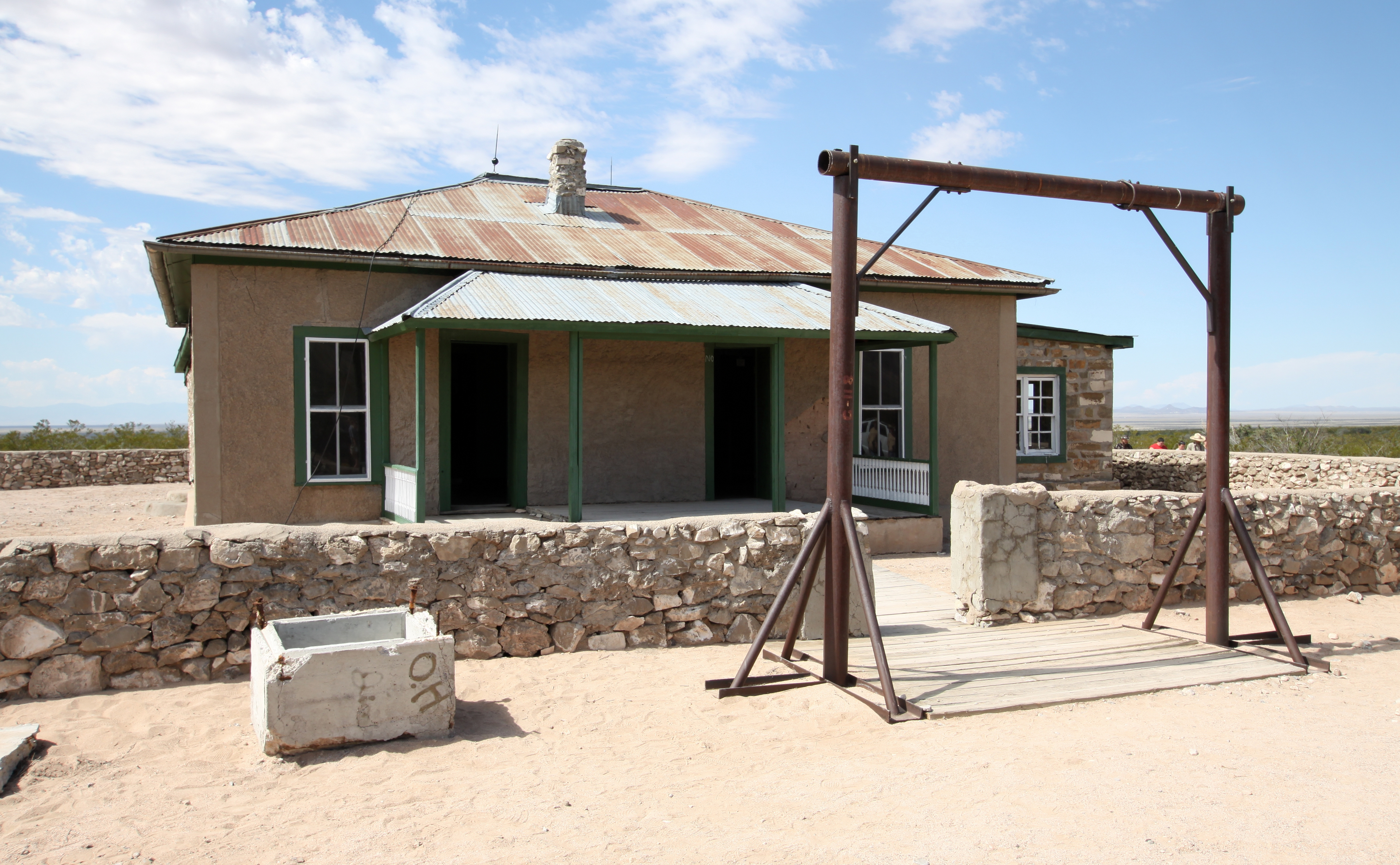
- The McDonald-Schmidt Ranch House. The concrete box at the foot of the stone wall is the remnant of a 1984 time capsule, buried for 25 years on the completion of the home's restoration.

- Location within New Mexico Location within the United States
- Location: White Sands Missile Range
- Nearest city: San Antonio, New Mexico
- Coordinates: 33°39′2.66″N 106°27′37.28″W
- Built: 1913
- Part of: Trinity Site (ID66000493)
- NRHP reference No.: 66000493
- NMSRCP No.: 30

Significant dates
- Added to NRHP: October 15, 1966
- Designated NHLDCP: December 21, 1965
- Designated NMSRCP: December 20, 1968

The McDonald Ranch House in the Oscura Mountains of Socorro County, New Mexico, was the location of assembly of the world's first nuclear weapon. The active components of the Trinity test "gadget", a plutonium Fat Man-type bomb similar to that later dropped on Nagasaki, Japan, were assembled there on July 13, 1945. The completed bomb was winched up the test tower the following day and detonated on July 16, 1945, as the Trinity nuclear test.

The McDonald Ranch House was built in 1913 by Franz Schmidt, a German immigrant, and acquired by the McDonald family in the 1930s. The ranch was vacated by the McDonald family under protest in 1942, when the United States Army took over the land as part of the Alamogordo Bombing and Gunnery Range to use in training bomber crews during World War II.

The family hoped that the ranch would be returned after the war, but it was not, and in 1970, the Army announced that it would be kept permanently. The McDonald Ranch House was empty and deteriorating until 1982, when it was stabilized by the Army. In 1984 it was restored by the National Park Service to appear as it did on July 12, 1945. The site is now open to visitors twice a year, on the first Saturday in April and the third Saturday in October.

== Early history ==
The George McDonald Ranch House sits within an 85-by-85-foot (26 by 26 m) low stone wall. The house was built in 1913 by Franz Schmidt, a German immigrant, whose old house a mile away burned down in 1912. An addition was constructed on the north side by the McDonald family, who had moved into the area in the late 1870s or early 1880s, and acquired the ranch house in the 1930s.

The ranch house is a one-story, 1,750-square-foot (163 m^{2}) building. It is built of adobe, which was plastered and painted. An ice house is located on the west side, along with an underground cistern which stored rain water running off the roof. At one time, the north addition contained a toilet and bathtub, which drained into a septic tank northwest of the house. There is a large, divided water storage tank and a Chicago Aermotor windmill east of the house. The scientists and support people used the north tank as a swimming pool during the summer of 1945. South of the windmill are the remains of a bunkhouse and a barn which was part garage. Further to the east are corrals and holding pens. The buildings and fixtures east of the house have been stabilized to prevent further deterioration.

The ranch was vacated by the McDonald family under protest in 1942, when the Alamogordo Bombing and Gunnery Range took over the land to use in training bomber crews during World War II. Area lands were condemned and ranchers simply told to leave. The occupants were given the option of going to court or accepting a settlement, but had to leave in either case. The McDonalds chose to go to court, and were awarded about $60,000 for their patented land.

== Manhattan Project ==
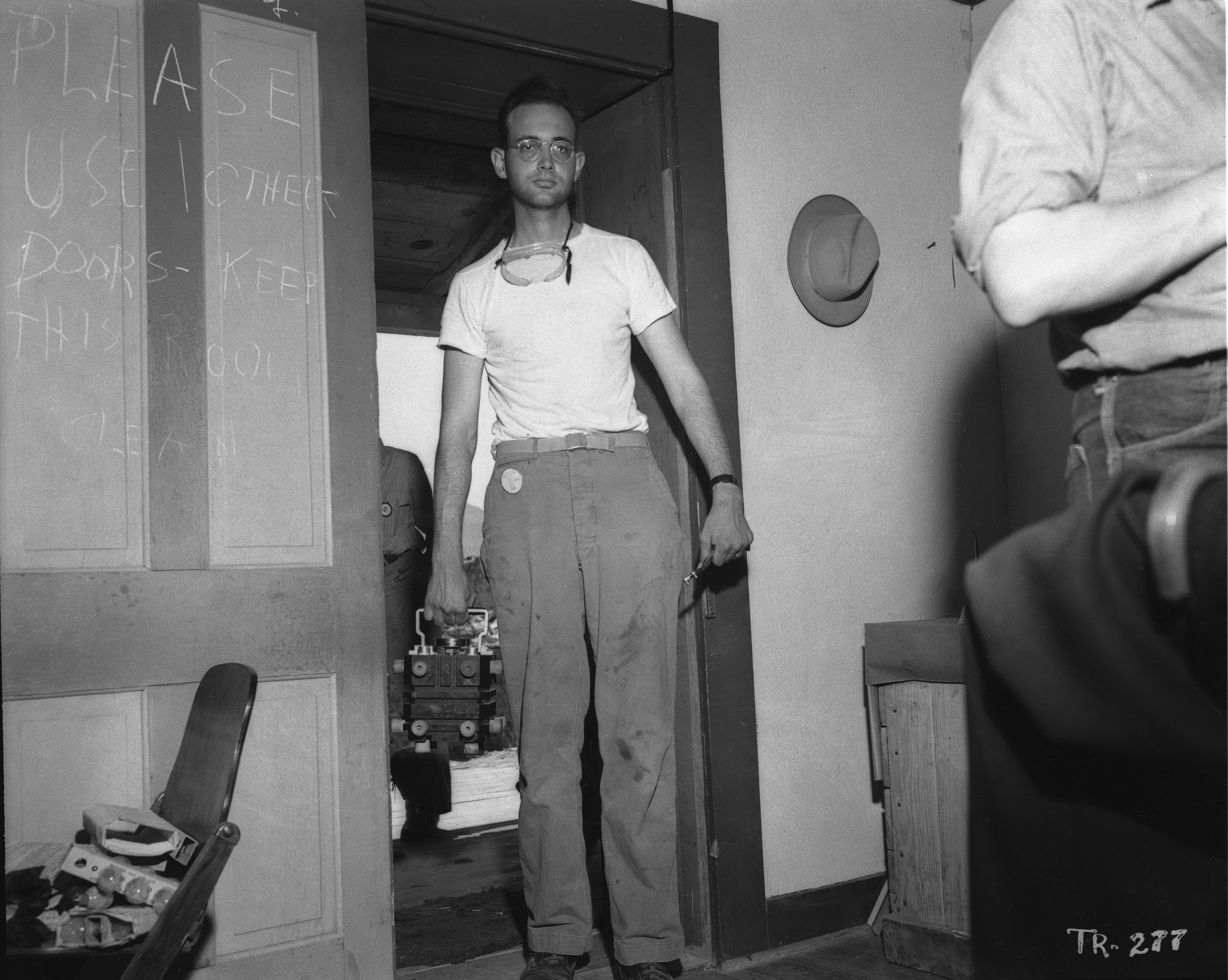
Sergeant Herbert Lehr, whose informal dress reflects the McDonald House's sweltering conditions in July 1945, delivered the plutonium core for the bomb in a shock-mounted carrying case

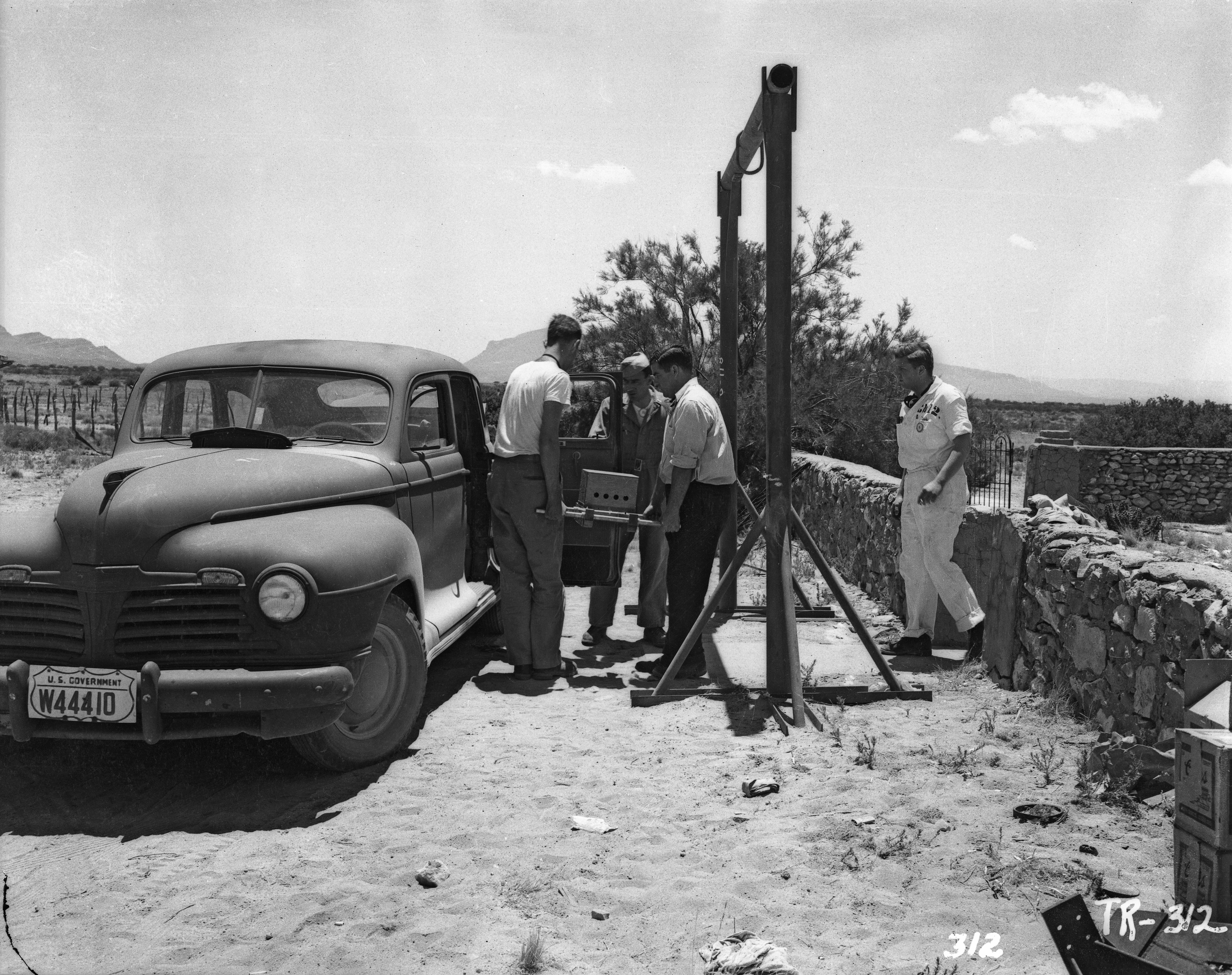
Components are loaded at the old McDonald Ranch for transport to the test site

The house stood empty until the Manhattan Project support personnel arrived in early 1945. The northeast room (the master bedroom) was designated the assembly room. Workbenches and tables were installed. To keep dust and sand out of instruments and tools, the windows were covered with plastic. Tape was used to fasten the edges of the plastic and to seal doors and cracks in the walls.

The plutonium hemispheres for the pit of the Trinity nuclear test "gadget" (bomb) were delivered to the McDonald Ranch House on July 11, 1945. Brigadier General Thomas F. Farrell, the deputy director of the Manhattan Project, signed for them, and handed them over to Louis Slotin, the head of the Pit Assembly Team. The active components of the bomb were assembled in the assembly room on July 13, 1945, The bomb was winched up the test tower the following day. The Trinity test occurred on July 16, 1945. A plutonium Fat Man-type bomb was detonated, similar to the bomb later dropped on Nagasaki.

The explosion only 2 miles (3.2 km) away blew most of the home's windows out but did not significantly damage the structure; years of rain water intrusion through the roof were responsible for decades of subsequent deterioration. The barn roof was bowed inward by the blast and some of its roofing was blown away; it collapsed some time thereafter.

== 1960s–1980s ==
On December 21, 1965, the Trinity Site was declared a National Historic Landmark district, and, on October 15, 1966, the McDonald House was listed on the National Register of Historic Places.

The McDonalds had expected that the ranch would be returned after the war, but this did not occur. In the 1970s the Army announced that the land would not be returned. Dave McDonald and his niece, Mary McDonald, staged an armed reoccupation of the ranch in protest in 1982.

The house stood empty and deteriorating until 1982. White Sands Missile Range commander United States Army Major General Niles J. Fulwyler, who had directed the restoration of the White Sands V-2 Launching Site, ordered the structure stabilized to prevent any further damage. Shortly after, Fulwyler acquired funding from the Department of Energy and the Army for the National Park Service to completely restore the house to the way it appeared on July 12, 1945. Work was completed in 1984.

Fulwyler buried a 25-year time capsule describing the restoration. It was opened during an open house on October 3, 2009. Its artifacts are now on display inside the home. On the back of a photograph of himself Fulwyler wrote:

Greetings to you of 2009. When I came to White Sands Missile Range in 1982 I took as my command project the restoration of the MacDonald Ranch House. It was my great privilege to be the catalyst for this restoration, ably assisted by Mr. Al Johnson, who died shortly after its dedication. This is a most historic structure, in a most historic area. I hope you and succeeding generations appreciate what we have done. Take care of it. It is part of our heritage.

== Access ==
For many years the site was open on the first Saturday in April and October. Admission is free. There is a display on the Schmidt family in the house during each open house. In 2014, the White Sands Missile Range announced that due to budgetary constraints, the site would only be open once a year, on the first Saturday in April. In 2015, this decision was reversed, and two events were scheduled, in April and October. As of 2022, the site is now open to visitors twice a year, on the first Saturday in April and the third Saturday in October.
