= Ted Trueblood =

American outdoor writer and conservationist (1913–1982)

- Born: Cecil Whittaker Trueblood; June 25, 1913; Boise, Idaho, U.S.
- Died: September 12, 1982 (aged 69); Nampa, Idaho, U.S.
- Education: College of Idaho; University of Idaho (no degree)
- Occupations: Journalist; author; conservationist
- Years active: 1942–1982

Cecil Whittaker "Ted" Trueblood (1913–1982) was an American outdoor writer and conservationist. From 1941 to 1982, he served as an editor and writer for the Field & Stream magazine.

== Early life and education ==
Trueblood was born in Boise, Idaho, on June 25, 1913, and was raised on his family farm near Homedale, Idaho. Trueblood graduated from Wilder High School in 1931. Drawn to writing about the outdoors, he published his first article in National Sportsman magazine in 1931. He attended both the College of Idaho and the University of Idaho, but left before earning his degree.

== Career ==
In 1936, he became a reporter for the Boise Capital News. In 1937, he became a reporter for the Deseret News in Salt Lake City. From there, he began writing articles for Field & Stream. He returned to Idaho in 1939 and married Ellen Michaelson. Together they had two sons, Dan and Jack. After struggling as a freelance writer, Trueblood took a public relations position with the Idaho Department of Fish and Game. He later became fishing editor of Field & Stream in 1941 and moved to New York City. In 1947, he moved back to Idaho in order to "fish, hunt, and write about it." From his home in Nampa, he remained an associate editor and contributor to Field & Stream, and continued writing articles for the magazine throughout his life. In addition to his magazine work, he also wrote several books about the outdoors, including The Angler's Handbook (1949), The Fishing Handbook (1951), On Hunting (1953), The Hunter's Handbook (1954), How to Catch More Fish (1955), Camping Handbook (1955), and The Ted Trueblood Hunting Treasury (1978).

Trueblood also worked as a conservation leader. In 1936, he helped to organize the Idaho Wildlife Federation, the state's major conservation group in the mid-twentieth century. Trueblood often helped the Federation fight many of its conservation battles. One of their most significant victories, in the 1950s, was the successful campaign to protect Idaho's salmon and steelhead trout by stopping the construction of Nez Perce Dam on the Snake River, which would have blocked the migration of fish up the undammed Salmon River. Trueblood advocated for the creation of the River of No Return Wilderness in central Idaho, and worked to oppose the anti-environmental "Sagebrush Rebellion" in 1980. His conservation work was honored with several awards, including a 1975 Conservation Service Award from the U.S. Department of the Interior and the 1975 Outdoorsman of the Year award from the Outdoor Writers of America.

Trueblood died at the age of 69 on September 12, 1982, from a self-inflicted gunshot wound to the head after experiencing a painful and terminal form of bone cancer.

His life of conservation leadership is commemorated by the Idaho Department of Fish and Game's Ted Trueblood Wildlife Area, near Grandview. In 1991, the newly organized Boise chapter of Trout Unlimited named itself the "Ted Trueblood Chapter."

His papers are housed in the Albertsons Library at Boise State University.
