= Dewey, Idaho =

- Ghost town
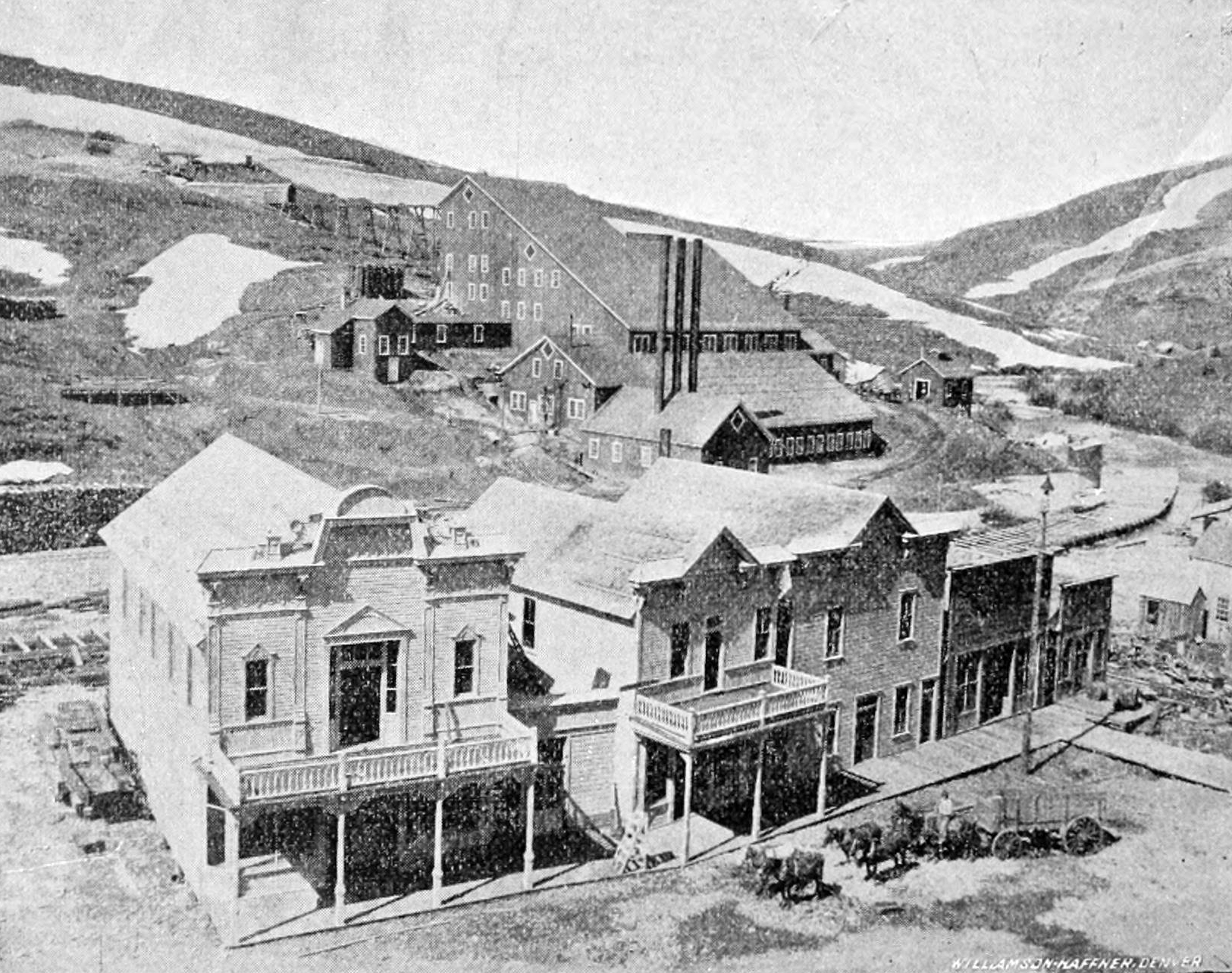
- Dewey in 1898

- Location within Idaho Location within the United States
- Coordinates: 43°02′25″N 116°45′44″W
- Country: United States
- State: Idaho
- County: Owyhee
- Elevation: 6,010 ft (1,830 m)
- Time zone: UTC-7 (Mountain (MST))
  - Summer (DST): UTC-6 (MDT)
- GNIS feature ID: 397625

Dewey is a ghost town in Owyhee County, Idaho, United States.

== History ==
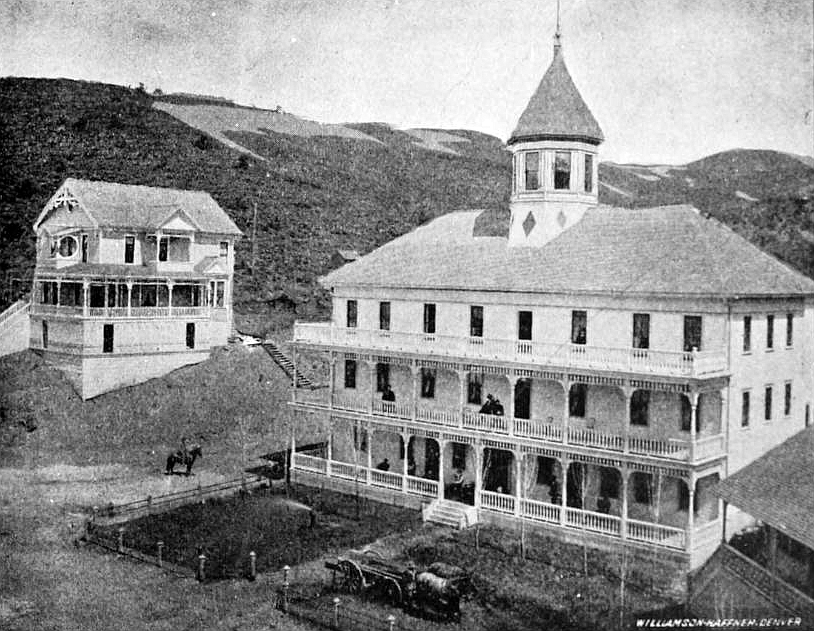
The Superintendent's Residence (left) and Hotel Dewey, 1898

The town was settled in 1863 and named "Booneville", after its first inhabitant, Captain Boone. Booneville was at first very prosperous, but then fell into decay.

In 1896, the property at Booneville and its hotel were purchased by Colonel W.H. Dewey, superintendent of the Florida Mountain Mining Company. Dewey's company erected a mill, and a mine was located nearby. The town had a butcher shop, general store, steam laundry, livery stable and barn, and a large hotel, the Hotel Dewey. "Nothing had been neglected in the way of making the town complete as to conveniences for its inhabitants".

A post office was established in 1897, and was named "Dewey".

Within a few years, there was a decline in mining, and the hotel had burned down. The town was soon abandoned.

All that remains of Dewey is a large cement powerplant building, and the mine dump.
