= The Ballad of Little Jo =

1993 film by Maggie Greenwald

- Theatrical release poster
- Directed by: Maggie Greenwald
- Written by: Maggie Greenwald
- Produced by: Fred Berner; Brenda Goodman
- Starring: Suzy Amis; Bo Hopkins; Ian McKellen; David Chung; René Auberjonois; Carrie Snodgress
- Cinematography: Declan Quinn
- Edited by: Keith Reamer
- Music by: David Mansfield
- Production company: PolyGram Filmed Entertainment
- Distributed by: Fine Line Features
- Release date: August 20, 1993
- Running time: 121 minutes
- Country: United States
- Language: English
- Budget: $4 million
- Box office: $543,091

The Ballad of Little Jo is a 1993 American Western drama film written and directed by Maggie Greenwald. It is inspired by the real-life story of Joe Monaghan, who lived as a man in the late 19th century despite being born anatomically female. It stars Suzy Amis as Monaghan, with Bo Hopkins, Ian McKellen, David Chung, René Auberjonois, and Carrie Snodgress in supporting roles.

The film was theatrically released in the United States on August 20, 1993, by Fine Line Features. It received positive reviews from critics, but performed poorly at the box office. For their performances, Amis and Chung earned Independent Spirit Award nominations for Best Female Lead and Best Supporting Male, respectively.

== Plot ==
Eastern society girl Josephine Monaghan falls in love with her family's photographer and bears their illegitimate son. Shamed, her father Amos disowns Josephine, forcing her out of his home. She leaves her newborn under the care of her sister. While on the road, peddler Streight Hollander offers her transportation, but then tries to sell her to soldiers, who want to rape her. Her dress ruined, she buys men's clothing, cuts her hair short, and scars her face with a straight razor before heading West disguised as a man.

At Ruby City, Lyle Hogg explains that the "rubies" for which the burgeoning mining camp is named are actually garnets, which "ain't worth much at all", so Jo tries her hand at prospecting for gold. Percy, who nurses a deep suspicion of women, and thinks Jo is a greenhorn, saves her from an armed altercation with Frank Badger who disdains Eastern "dudes". Percy teaches her how to survive in the rough frontier, starting with a job in the livery.

Later, after Jack Wilkins quits, Jo accepts a job from Frank herding sheep in the mountains, which requires her to learn how to shoot to fend off coyotes. After surviving Winter and returning to town in the spring, Percy gives Jo a letter from Jo's sister, which Percy had opened and read, discovering that he is a she. Percy calls her a whore and tries to rape her, but Jo pulls her pistol, recalling how Percy had badly abused a prostitute named Elvira. Percy blackmails Jo, claiming he will not share her secret if she finances his journey out of the territory.

Jo eventually saves enough money to buy her own homestead. One day in town, Jo comes across a mob, which includes Frank, about to lynch a Chinese laborer. Jo intervenes, and the "chinaman", Tinman Wong, goes to live with Jo to help with the homestead. After only three days, Tinman discovers the truth about her, and in doing so, reveals he is far more intelligent than he has pretended to be—he, too, has been masquerading for his own safety. The two begin a love affair, and she learns his real name is Tien Ma.

Eastern speculators form the Western Cattle Company to buy up all the land in the area, and they kill anyone who does not comply, including a Russian family who Jo had guided to their new homestead. At her home, miles from anyone else, Jo dons a dress once again in a feeble effort to step back into a more traditionally feminine role. Tinman argues that it will be impossible for her to go back being a society woman, urging her to keep the homestead. Jo is not swayed, and meets with the representative from the cattle company, Henry Grey, to tell him she will sell. As Henry prepares the papers, Jo watches his wife Beatrice, who, through the warped glass, is visually reminiscent of Jo when she was a woman of society. Jo confronts Henry, asking if his wife knows how many people he has killed, and changes her mind, refusing to sell. Three of Grey's masked gunmen intercept Frank and Jo, who are heading into town to vote in the upcoming Ruby City elections. Frank shoots one, but another shoots Frank in the shoulder, forcing Jo to kill the other two.

Many years later, after Tinman Wong's death, Jo collapses while fetching water, and dies. While preparing Jo for interment, the undertaker discovers Little Jo was a woman. Townsfolk rush from Addie's Saloon over to the undertaker's to inspect her corpse, and they stand around the preparation table in shock – Mrs. Addie cracks a smile and begins laughing. They redress Jo in her men's clothing and tie Jo's dead body to her horse so that Miss J. B. Tyler can take a photograph for the newspaper. Angry at the deception, Frank ransacks Jo's home, finding letters from her sister, and the photograph that had been taken thirty years prior as a beautiful young society girl.

The two photos, before-and-after, are published on the front page of the Rocky Mountain Gazette with the headline, "RANCHER JO WAS A WOMAN!"

== Cast ==
- Suzy Amis as Josephine "Jo" Monaghan
- Bo Hopkins as Frank Badger
- Ian McKellen as Percy Corcoran
- David Chung as Tinman Wong
- Anthony Heald as Henry Grey
- Heather Graham as Mary Addie
- Ruth Maleczech as Shopkeeper
- Melissa Leo as Beatrice Grey
- Sam Robards as Jasper Hill
- René Auberjonois as Streight Hollander
- Carrie Snodgress as Ruth Badger
- Olinda Turturro as Elvira
- Cathy Haase as Mrs. Addie
- Michael Ruud as Russian Father
- Robert Erickson as Jack Wilkins

== Production ==
Maggie Greenwald completed the screenplay in early 1991, after learning about the life of Monaghan. Six months before filming, Suzy Amis began training with a body builder and movement and vocal coaches, while taking sheepherding, shooting, and horse riding lessons.

Principal photography began on September 22, 1992 in Montana. A production office was set up in Red Lodge, Montana, on the edge of the Custer National Forest, and the art department was housed in an airplane hangar. Several actors and animal wranglers were cast from Montana and nearby states.

== Reception ==
=== Critical response ===
On the review aggregator website Rotten Tomatoes, 77% of 53 critics' reviews are positive, with an average rating of 6.8/10. The website's consensus reads: "It sometimes moseys when it should have galloped, but The Ballad of Little Jo entertainingly upends genre formula while simultaneously highlighting its strengths."

Emanuel Levy of Variety stated, "Greenwald is so committed to a feminist agenda that her treatment leaves out a good deal of the humor and suspense inherent in the story. […] Fortunately, Greenwald's casting and direction of the actors are more successful." Levy highlighted Amis' portrayal of Jo, opining that "what makes The Ballad of Little Jo worthy is Amis' full-bodied performance in what may be her most challenging role to date."

Stephen Holden of The New York Times wrote, "It's not hard to view The Ballad of Little Jo as an allegorical critique of sex and power and men's-club values in America. In its disdain for those values, the film is as focused and cool-headed as the remarkable character whose story it tells." Holden also praised Amis' portrayal of Jo, noting that "the film is illuminated by Ms. Amis's haunting performance."

Peter Rainer of the Los Angeles Times described the film as "a severely de-romanticized view of the Old West and the women who labored—in more ways than one—on its frontiers." Rainer also wrote, "The film ends as more of a dirge than a ballad. But occasionally it casts a forlorn spell. The meaning of Jo Monaghan's life may not really emerge in this film but its mystery lingers."

Roger Ebert gave the film 3 out of 4 stars and stated, "The writer and director, Maggie Greenwald, wisely avoids an old-fashioned plot, and concerns herself more with the daily texture of life in the West." Ebert also noted that "it is rather rough and crude, but it's in the spirit of the film, in which men of poor breeding lived and worked together in desperate poverty of mind and body."

=== Controversy ===
The film has been criticized for reinforcing a feminized image of Asian males in American mass media.

=== Accolades ===
Year	Award	Category	Recipient	Result	Ref.
1994	9th Independent Spirit Awards	Best Female Lead	Suzy Amis	Nominated	
1994	9th Independent Spirit Awards	Best Supporting Male	David Chung	Nominated	

== Stage musical ==
A stage musical adaptation by Mike Reid and Sarah Schlesinger premiered at Chicago's Steppenwolf Theatre Company on September 24, 2000. The show was directed by Tina Landau, with Judy Kuhn starring as the title character, alongside Rondi Reed, Jose Llana, David New, and Jessica Boevers.

The first musical by Steppenwolf, The Ballad of Little Jo was chosen as the initial production of its 25th anniversary season. However, the show was not terribly well received by critics.
