= Homedale, Idaho =

- City
- Location of Homedale in Owyhee County, Idaho.
- Coordinates: 43°37′18″N 116°56′13″W
- Country: United States
- State: Idaho
- County: Owyhee

Area
  - Total: 1.42 sq mi (3.69 km^{2})
  - Land: 1.41 sq mi (3.66 km^{2})
  - Water: 0.012 sq mi (0.03 km^{2})
- Elevation: 2,241 ft (683 m)

Population (2020)
  - Total: 2,881
  - Density: 1,926.3/sq mi (743.75/km^{2})
- Time zone: UTC-7 (Mountain (MST))
  - Summer (DST): UTC-6 (MDT)
- ZIP code: 83628
- Area codes: 208, 986
- FIPS code: 16-38170
- GNIS feature ID: 2410782
- Website: cityofhomedale.org

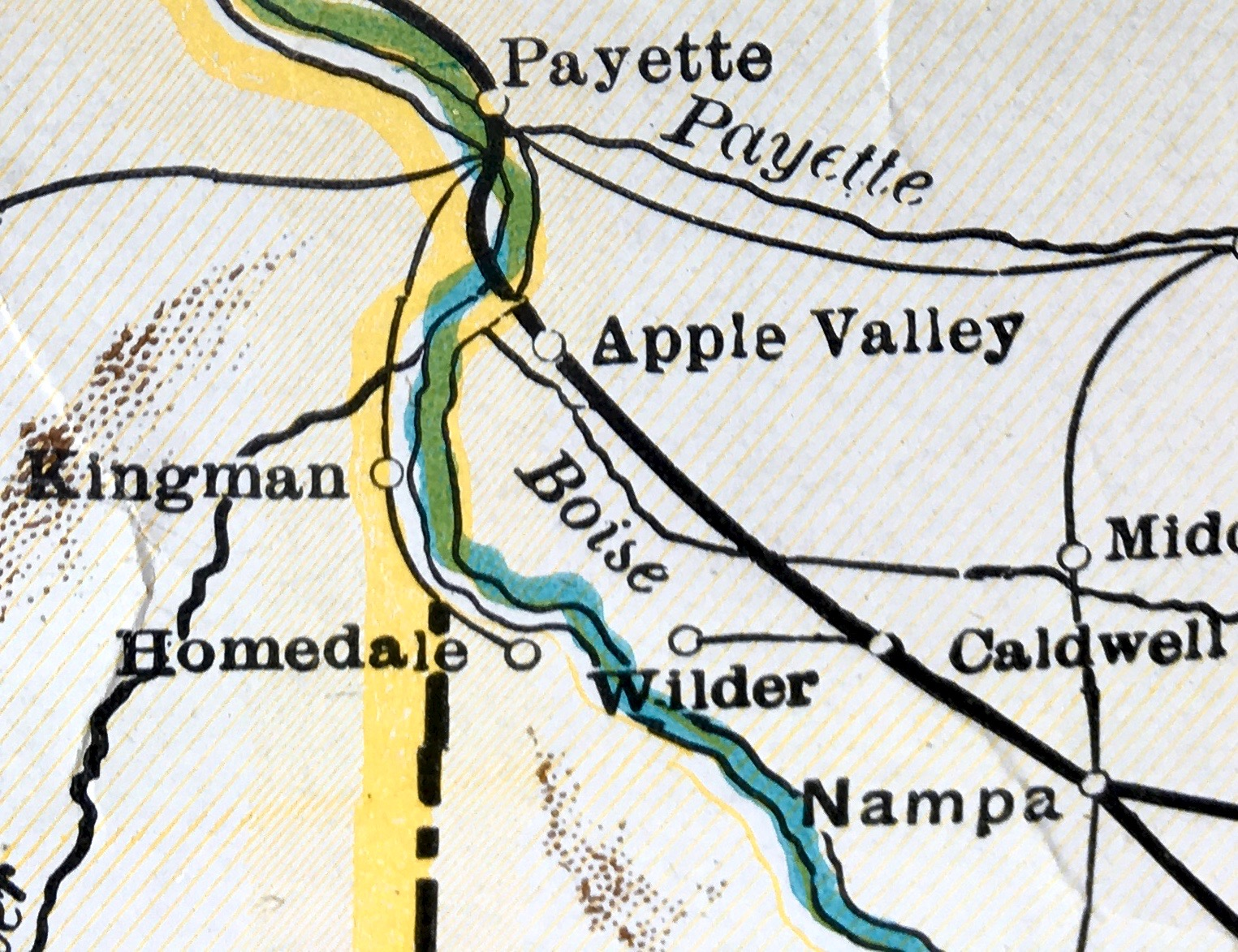
Branch RR route in 1930

Homedale is a city in Owyhee County Idaho. As of the 2020 census, Homedale had a population of 2,881. The town name was chosen by drawing names from a hat during a community picnic. Homedale is part of the Boise metropolitan area. It was, at one time, the terminus of a branch of the Oregon Short Line Railroad.

== History ==
Homedale was first settled by Jacob Mussell in the late 19th century. In 1898 Jacob Mussell built a ferry boat to help settlers cross the Snake River making Homedale more accessible. By 1914 Homedale had a mayor, a council, a schoolhouse, and a railroad though it wouldn't be an official city until 1920. In 1914 Austrians were lured to Homedale and promised good farming ground. When they arrived in Homedale they found the land undeveloped though they still had to buy the land. Today there still is an Austrian Town in Homedale. Basque culture is also deeply rooted in Homedale.

== Geography ==
Homedale is on the Snake River, which is the border with Canyon County.

According to the United States Census Bureau, the city has a total area of 1.47 square miles (3.81 km^{2}), all of it land.

== Demographics ==
Historical population
Census	Pop.	Note	%±
1930	225		—
1940	857		280.9%
1950	1,411		64.6%
1960	1,381		−2.1%
1970	1,411		2.2%
1980	2,078		47.3%
1990	1,963		−5.5%
2000	2,528		28.8%
2010	2,633		4.2%
2020	2,881		9.4%
2019 (est.)	2,720		3.3%
U.S. Decennial Census

=== 2020 census ===
As of the 2020 census, Homedale had a population of 2,881. The median age was 33.1 years. 29.4% of residents were under the age of 18 and 14.7% of residents were 65 years of age or older. For every 100 females, there were 99.4 males, and for every 100 females age 18 and over, there were 94.9 males.

There were 952 households in Homedale, of which 42.3% had children under the age of 18 living in them. Of all households, 45.8% were married-couple households, 19.5% were households with a male householder and no spouse or partner present, and 24.6% were households with a female householder and no spouse or partner present. About 21.4% of all households were made up of individuals and 10.2% had someone living alone who was 65 years of age or older.

There were 997 housing units, of which 4.5% were vacant. The homeowner vacancy rate was 2.0% and the rental vacancy rate was 1.5%. 0.0% of residents lived in urban areas, while 100.0% lived in rural areas.

Racial composition as of the 2020 census
Race	Number	Percent
White	1,804	62.6%
Black or African American	6	0.2%
American Indian and Alaska Native	38	1.3%
Asian	9	0.3%
Native Hawaiian and Other Pacific Islander	2	0.1%
Some other race	621	21.6%
Two or more races	401	13.9%
Hispanic or Latino (of any race)	1,157	40.2%

=== 2010 census ===
As of the census of 2010, there were 2,633 people, 877 households, and 609 families living in the city. The population density was 1,791.2 inhabitants per square mile (691.6/km^{2}). There were 960 housing units at an average density of 653.1 per square mile (252.2/km^{2}). The racial makeup of the city was 63.1% White, 0.2% African American, 1.3% Native American, 1.0% Asian, 31.3% from other races, and 3.2% from two or more races. Hispanic or Latino of any race were 43.0% of the population.

There were 877 households, of which 43.9% had children under the age of 18 living with them, 48.2% were married couples living together, 14.3% had a female householder with no husband present, 7.0% had a male householder with no wife present, and 30.6% were non-families. 25.2% of all households were made up of individuals, and 12.9% had someone living alone who was 65 years of age or older. The average household size was 2.96 and the average family size was 3.58.

The median age in the city was 31.9 years. 33.5% of residents were under the age of 18; 8.7% were between the ages of 18 and 24; 25.2% were from 25 to 44; 19% were from 45 to 64; and 13.5% were 65 years of age or older. The gender makeup of the city was 49.9% male and 50.1% female.

=== 2000 census ===
As of the census of 2000, there were 2,528 people, 842 households, and 595 families living in the city. The population density was 2,859.5 inhabitants per square mile (1,104.1/km^{2}). There were 933 housing units at an average density of 1,055.3 per square mile (407.5/km^{2}). The racial makeup of the city was 63.77% White, 0.20% African American, 0.99% Native American, 0.71% Asian, 0.08% Pacific Islander, 30.58% from other races, and 3.68% from two or more races. Hispanic or Latino of any race were 39.24% of the population.

There were 842 households, out of which 42.3% had children under the age of 18 living with them, 54.3% were married couples living together, 12.4% had a female householder with no husband present, and 29.3% were non-families. 26.6% of all households were made up of individuals, and 14.7% had someone living alone who was 65 years of age or older. The average household size was 2.95 and the average family size was 3.66.

In the city, the population was spread out, with 36.0% under the age of 18, 8.8% from 18 to 24, 25.0% from 25 to 44, 16.2% from 45 to 64, and 14.0% who were 65 years of age or older. The median age was 29 years. For every 100 females, there were 96.7 males. For every 100 females age 18 and over, there were 92.7 males.

The median income for a household in the city was $24,196, and the median income for a family was $27,500. Males had a median income of $22,740 versus $19,722 for females. The per capita income for the city was $10,986. About 17.8% of families and 20.3% of the population were below the poverty line, including 24.9% of those under age 18 and 13.1% of those age 65 or over.

== Highways ==
The city is served by U.S. Route 95, the primary north–south highway for the state. State Highway 19 heads westward for five miles (8 km) and enters Oregon to become Oregon Route 201, which turns northward to Ontario.

== Climate ==
According to the Köppen climate classification, Homedale has a cold semi arid climate (BSk).

Climate data for Homedale, Idaho, 1991–2020 normals, extremes 1990–present
Month	Jan	Feb	Mar	Apr	May	Jun	Jul	Aug	Sep	Oct	Nov	Dec	Year
Record high °F (°C)	62 (17)	69 (21)	82 (28)	90 (32)	100 (38)	107 (42)	112 (44)	109 (43)	104 (40)	94 (34)	82 (28)	66 (19)	112 (44)
Mean maximum °F (°C)	53.5 (11.9)	61.0 (16.1)	71.0 (21.7)	82.0 (27.8)	91.3 (32.9)	98.5 (36.9)	104.1 (40.1)	102.8 (39.3)	95.8 (35.4)	84.4 (29.1)	65.7 (18.7)	56.1 (13.4)	104.8 (40.4)
Mean daily maximum °F (°C)	37.9 (3.3)	45.7 (7.6)	56.5 (13.6)	63.7 (17.6)	73.0 (22.8)	81.4 (27.4)	92.3 (33.5)	91.1 (32.8)	80.5 (26.9)	65.7 (18.7)	49.5 (9.7)	38.7 (3.7)	64.7 (18.1)
Daily mean °F (°C)	30.4 (−0.9)	36.3 (2.4)	44.3 (6.8)	50.6 (10.3)	59.9 (15.5)	67.0 (19.4)	75.7 (24.3)	73.2 (22.9)	63.3 (17.4)	50.7 (10.4)	39.0 (3.9)	30.9 (−0.6)	51.8 (11.0)
Mean daily minimum °F (°C)	22.9 (−5.1)	26.8 (−2.9)	32.0 (0.0)	37.4 (3.0)	46.8 (8.2)	52.7 (11.5)	59.1 (15.1)	55.4 (13.0)	46.0 (7.8)	35.7 (2.1)	28.5 (−1.9)	23.1 (−4.9)	38.9 (3.8)
Mean minimum °F (°C)	6.1 (−14.4)	12.4 (−10.9)	17.6 (−8.0)	22.2 (−5.4)	31.4 (−0.3)	39.5 (4.2)	46.2 (7.9)	43.1 (6.2)	33.0 (0.6)	21.1 (−6.1)	12.5 (−10.8)	6.9 (−13.9)	1.3 (−17.1)
Record low °F (°C)	−17 (−27)	3 (−16)	11 (−12)	13 (−11)	22 (−6)	33 (1)	35 (2)	32 (0)	19 (−7)	8 (−13)	−3 (−19)	−15 (−26)	−17 (−27)
Average precipitation inches (mm)	1.45 (37)	0.85 (22)	0.94 (24)	0.87 (22)	1.30 (33)	0.81 (21)	0.30 (7.6)	0.22 (5.6)	0.41 (10)	0.75 (19)	0.98 (25)	1.18 (30)	10.06 (256.2)
Average precipitation days (≥ 0.01 in)	6.1	4.0	5.0	6.2	4.3	4.4	1.1	1.3	1.1	3.8	4.7	5.3	47.3
Source 1: NOAA
Source 2: National Weather Service

== Education ==
The school district is Homedale Joint School District 370.

- Homedale Elementary School, grades K–4.
- Homedale Middle School, grades 5–8.
- Homedale High School, grades 9–12.

== Newspaper ==
- The Owyhee Avalanche

== Annual events ==
- Txoko Ona Basque dance
- July 4 Demolition Derby
- Owyhee County Fair and Rodeo (first full week in August)
- Conner Landa Memorial Softball Tournament (July)

== Notable people ==
- Niles Fulwyler, United States Army major general
- Ralph D. Townsend, military officer
- Ted Trueblood, outdoor writer and conservationist
- Fred Wood, member of the Idaho House of Representatives
- Scott Matlock, Los Angeles Chargers football player

== See also ==
- List of cities in Idaho
