= Murphy, Idaho =

Census-designated place in and county seat of Owyhee County, Idaho, United States

- Census-designated place
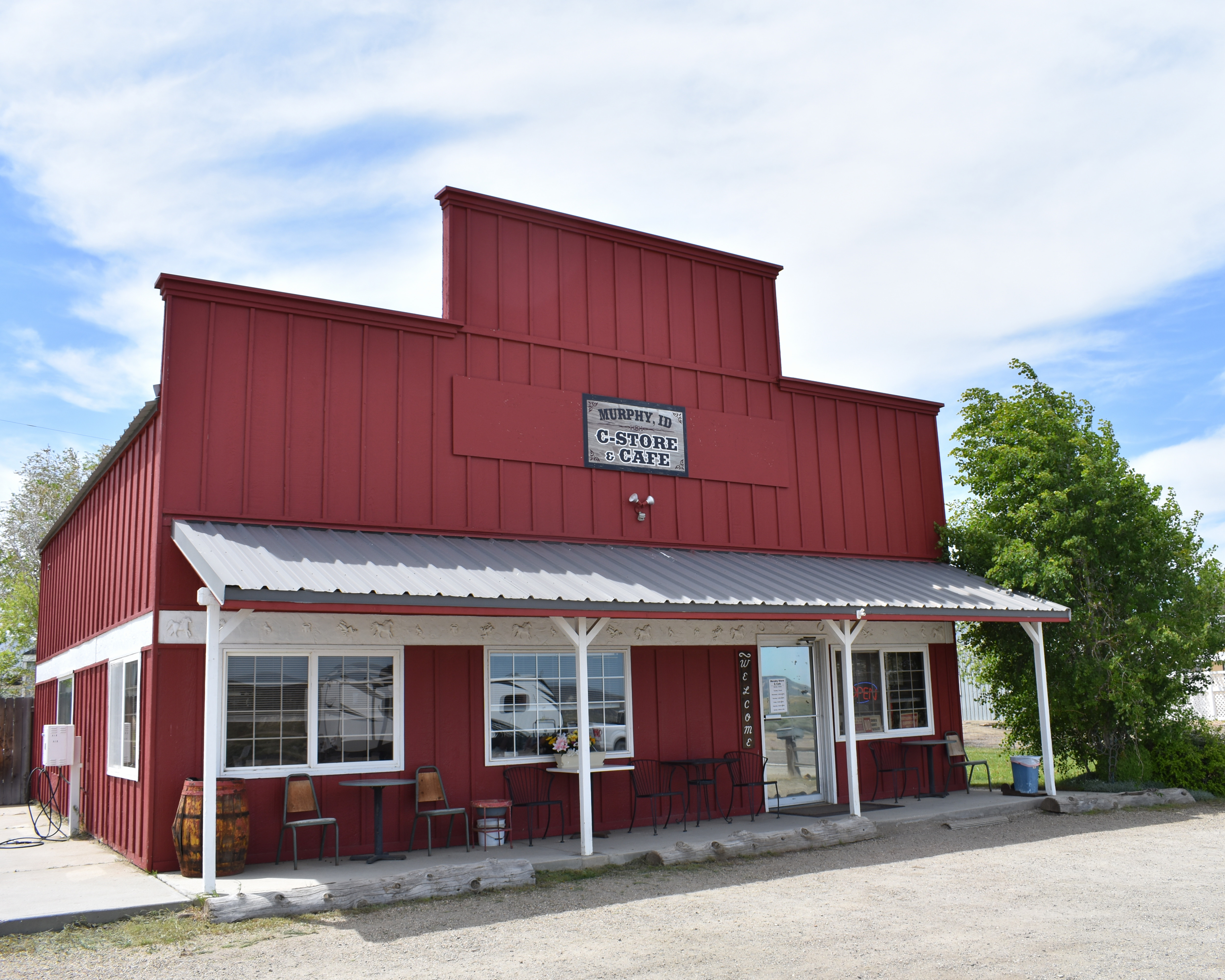
- The Murphy General Store and Cafe, May 2019

- Location of Murphy in Owyhee County, Idaho.

- Locationof Murphy Murphy, Idaho (the United States)
- Coordinates: 43°12′44″N 116°32′55″W
- Country: United States
- State: Idaho
- County: Owyhee

Area
  - Total: 3.839 sq mi (9.94 km^{2})
  - Land: 3.839 sq mi (9.94 km^{2})
  - Water: 0 sq mi (0 km^{2})
- Elevation: 2,871 ft (875 m)

Population (2020)
  - Total: 96
  - Density: 25/sq mi (9.7/km^{2})
- Time zone: UTC-7 (Mountain (MST))
  - Summer (DST): UTC-6 (MDT)
- ZIP codes: 83650
- Area codes: 208, 986
- FIPS code: 16-55720
- GNIS feature ID: 2585580

Murphy is a census-designated place in and the county seat of Owyhee County, Idaho, United States. It is among the smallest of county seats nationwide, with a population as of the 2020 census of 96. Murphy is part of the Boise City–Nampa, Idaho Metropolitan Statistical Area. Murphy is also located within the census-designated place bearing its name. Murphy is home to the Owyhee County Historical Museum and Library.

== History ==
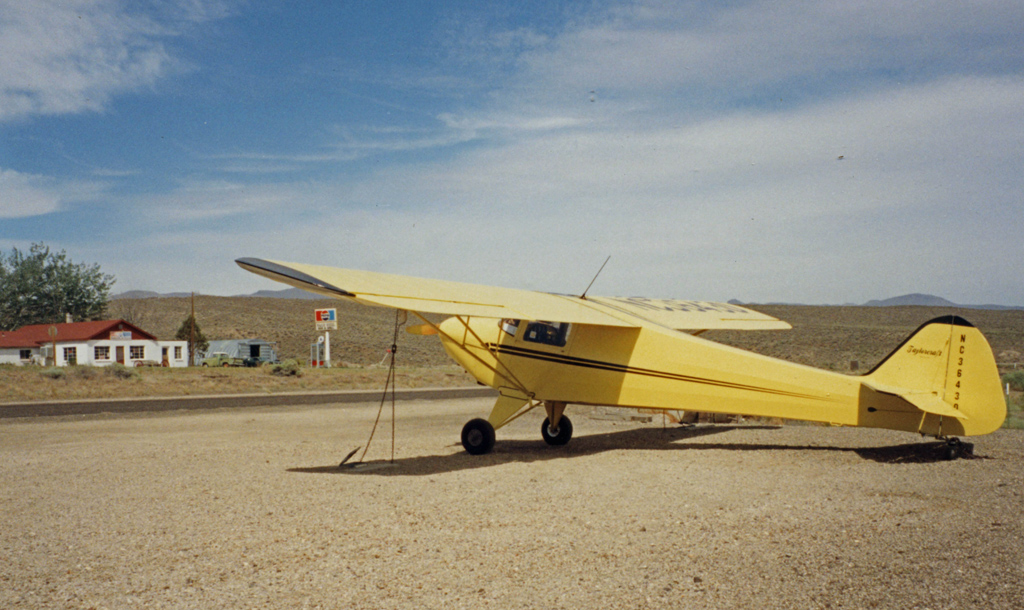
View looking northwest from Murphy airport toward Route 78

Murphy developed around a railhead of the Boise, Nampa and Owyhee Railroad, built in 1899 by Colonel William H. Dewey. Dewey had planned to extend the railroad to Silver City, but when mining operations in the Owyhee Mountains became unproductive, the line was not continued past Murphy. The railroad operated until 1947.

By a narrow margin, Owyhee County voters selected Murphy as county seat in 1934, succeeding Silver City (which was located in the Owyhee Mountains and had been in decline; it is now defunct). Although the county seat was moved to Murphy after the vote, and a new Owyhee County Courthouse was constructed in 1936, the Idaho State Legislature did not ratify the change of county seat until 1999. The error in the Idaho Code, discovered by county prosecutor G. Edward Yarbrough, was finally corrected by Senate Bill 1009.

The community likely was named after Cornelius "Con" Murphy, a crew boss with the Boise, Nampa and Owyhee Railroad and foreman during construction of the Guffey Bridge in 1897. Another source for the name may have been Pat Murphy, a Silver City mining engineer and friend of railroad owner Dewey.

Murphy's population was estimated at 100 in 1909, and was 50 in 1960.

== Demographics ==
Historical population
Census	Pop.	Note	%±
1900	80		—
1910	102		27.5%
1920	150		47.1%
1930	75		−50.0%
1950	50		—
1960	50		0.0%
1970	100		100.0%
1980	150		50.0%
1990	150		0.0%
2010	97		—
2020	96		−1.0%

== Geography ==
Murphy is located 25 miles (40 km) south of Nampa.

=== Climate ===
According to the Köppen climate classification, Murphy has a cold semi arid climate (BSk).

Climate data for Murphy, Idaho, 1991–2020 normals, extremes 2003–present
Month	Jan	Feb	Mar	Apr	May	Jun	Jul	Aug	Sep	Oct	Nov	Dec	Year
Record high °F (°C)	60 (16)	65 (18)	74 (23)	83 (28)	94 (34)	103 (39)	104 (40)	103 (39)	103 (39)	88 (31)	76 (24)	62 (17)	104 (40)
Mean maximum °F (°C)	53.4 (11.9)	58.4 (14.7)	67.8 (19.9)	77.1 (25.1)	86.1 (30.1)	93.6 (34.2)	99.0 (37.2)	97.4 (36.3)	91.1 (32.8)	79.3 (26.3)	67.1 (19.5)	56.0 (13.3)	99.9 (37.7)
Mean daily maximum °F (°C)	39.5 (4.2)	43.6 (6.4)	52.3 (11.3)	58.7 (14.8)	68.2 (20.1)	76.9 (24.9)	87.7 (30.9)	86.1 (30.1)	76.3 (24.6)	62.1 (16.7)	47.2 (8.4)	38.2 (3.4)	61.4 (16.3)
Daily mean °F (°C)	30.7 (−0.7)	33.9 (1.1)	40.7 (4.8)	45.6 (7.6)	54.2 (12.3)	61.6 (16.4)	70.9 (21.6)	69.5 (20.8)	60.2 (15.7)	48.1 (8.9)	36.4 (2.4)	29.4 (−1.4)	48.4 (9.1)
Mean daily minimum °F (°C)	21.8 (−5.7)	24.3 (−4.3)	29.0 (−1.7)	32.5 (0.3)	40.2 (4.6)	46.3 (7.9)	54.1 (12.3)	53.0 (11.7)	44.0 (6.7)	34.2 (1.2)	25.5 (−3.6)	20.5 (−6.4)	35.5 (1.9)
Mean minimum °F (°C)	4.8 (−15.1)	10.7 (−11.8)	17.3 (−8.2)	20.4 (−6.4)	26.3 (−3.2)	35.1 (1.7)	43.8 (6.6)	42.0 (5.6)	32.2 (0.1)	19.7 (−6.8)	11.0 (−11.7)	1.9 (−16.7)	−1.9 (−18.8)
Record low °F (°C)	−16 (−27)	−3 (−19)	10 (−12)	14 (−10)	20 (−7)	31 (−1)	40 (4)	35 (2)	25 (−4)	4 (−16)	−4 (−20)	−10 (−23)	−16 (−27)
Average precipitation inches (mm)	1.24 (31)	0.83 (21)	1.12 (28)	0.98 (25)	1.40 (36)	1.10 (28)	0.33 (8.4)	0.30 (7.6)	0.56 (14)	0.74 (19)	1.30 (33)	1.40 (36)	11.30 (287)
Average precipitation days (≥ 0.01 in)	9.4	9.2	10.1	8.4	9.7	7.2	3.0	2.8	3.8	5.4	9.1	10.9	89.0
Source 1: NOAA
Source 2: National Weather Service (mean maxima/minima 2006–2020)

== Airstrip ==
Murphy's airstrip is situated immediately northeast of the community, without a control tower. Its 2,500-foot (760 m) asphalt runway is oriented NW-SE (12/30), parallel with State Highway 78. The elevation drops 60 feet (18 m) in the northwest (30) direction, from 2,855 to 2,795 feet.

== Education ==
The school district is Melba Joint School District 136.

== See also ==
- List of census-designated places in Idaho
