= Owyhee County, Idaho =

County in Idaho, United States

- County
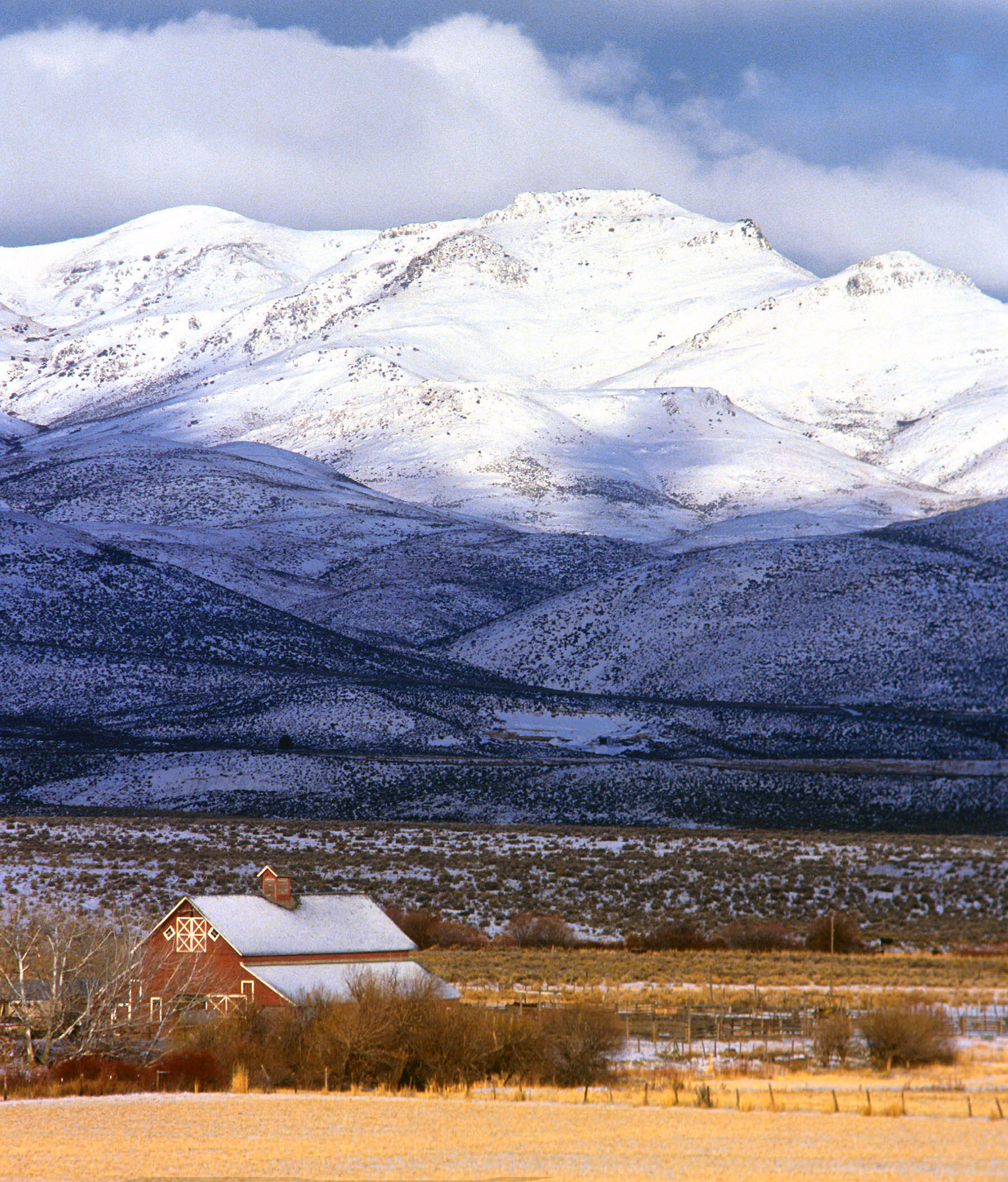
- Reynolds Creek Experimental Watershed in the Owyhee Mountains about 50 miles southwest of Boise.

- Seal

- Location within the U.S. state of Idaho
- Coordinates: 42°34′N 116°10′W
- Country: United States
- State: Idaho
- Founded: December 31, 1863
- Named for: lost Hawaiian trappers
- Seat: Murphy
- Largest city: Homedale

Area
  - Total: 7,697 sq mi (19,940 km^{2})
  - Land: 7,666 sq mi (19,850 km^{2})
  - Water: 31 sq mi (80 km^{2}) 0.4%

Population (2020)
  - Total: 11,913
  - Estimate (2025): 12,661 ▲
  - Density: 1.554/sq mi (0.6000/km^{2})
- Time zone: UTC−7 (Mountain)
  - Summer (DST): UTC−6 (MDT)
- Congressional district: 1st
- Website: owyheecounty.net

Owyhee County (/oʊˈwaɪ.hiː/ oh-WYE-hee) is a county in the southwestern corner of the U.S. state of Idaho. As of the 2020 census, the population was 11,913. The county seat is Murphy, and its largest city is Homedale. In area it is the second-largest county in Idaho, behind Idaho County. Owyhee County is part of the Boise metropolitan area and contains slightly more than half of the Duck Valley Indian Reservation, which extends over the Nevada border, into Elko County. The majority of the federally recognized Shoshone-Paiute Tribe that is associated with this reservation lives on the Nevada side; its tribal center is in Owyhee, Nevada.

== History ==
This area was the territory of Western Shoshone, Northern Paiute, and Bannock peoples and their ancestors for thousands of years prior to the arrival of European settlers. Settler interests in securing land and resources spurred conflict and led to the indigenous peoples being forced onto reservations.

On December 31, 1863, Owyhee County became the first county organized by the Idaho Territory Legislature. While Boise, Idaho, Nez Perce, and Shoshone counties were organized under the laws of Washington Territory, they were not recognized by the Idaho Territory until February 1864. The original county seat at Ruby City was moved to nearby Silver City in 1867.

Owyhee County's original boundary was the portion of Idaho Territory south of the Snake River and west of the Rocky Mountains. Less than a month after the creation of Owyhee County, Oneida County was formed in January 1864 from the eastern portion of the county. The formation of Cassia County in 1879 took further territory in the east.

Owyhee County's history is closely linked to the mining boom that dominated Idaho Territory in the second half of the 19th century. Silver City and Ruby City developed as boom towns. At its height in the 1880s, Owyhee County was among the most populous places in Idaho. Today it is among the least populous, at 1.4 persons per square mile (0.54 persons/km^{2}).

Because of pressure from miners and settlers, the federal government made a treaty in 1877 with the Western Shoshone to cede land, and established what is now known as the Duck Valley Indian Reservation in this county and across the border in Elko County, Nevada. The reservation was expanded in 1886 to accommodate people of the Northern Paiute. In the 20th century, the tribes combined and are federally recognized as a single government; the majority of the people live on the Nevada side of the reservation.

There were two railroad lines extending into Owyhee County, the first was the Boise Nampa & Owyhee Railroad which built starting in 1896 from Nampa, Idaho south towards Melba, Idaho and eventually across the Snake River into Owyhee County in 1897, whereupon it crossed Rabbit Creek before arriving in Murphy, Idaho. The first train into Murphy occurred in 1899. The Boise, Nampa & Owyhee Railroad was acquired by the Idaho Northern Railroad in 1907; the line was taken over by the Oregon Short Line Railroad in 1913 following their purchase of the Idaho Northern Railroad, after which it became known as the Murphy Branch line. Daily passenger service to Murphy was discontinued in 1942. By 1947, shipping animals out of Murphy was no longer profitable for the railroad. The Murphy portion of the line was abandoned in 1947. In the 1950s, trucks and highways became the dominant mode of transportation. The last train left Melba in 1994, and all rails were torn out in that same year.

The second railroad line was the Oregon Shortline Railroad which built south from Nyssa Oregon beginning in 1911, passing through Adrian Oregon the line ended after 25 miles in Homedale Idaho, in 1922 it was extended Marsing Idaho to accommodate additional agricultural traffic. In 1970, the Marsing and Homedale depots were closed by Union Pacific. In 1987, with declining carload, Union Pacific offered the line for sale but no buyers were found. Following the closure of the lumber mill in Homedale in the early 1990s, the Homedale branch (now reduced to the status of an "industrial lead") generated a total of 49 carloads in 1995 and 42 in 1996. In 1997, Union Pacific filed for permission to abandon the Idaho portion of the line and received no formal protest, the tracks were ripped up the following year.

Owyhee County gained its present boundaries in 1930 after an election approved moving a portion of it near Glenns Ferry and King Hill to neighboring Elmore County. In 1934, the county seat was moved from the nearly abandoned Silver City to its present location in Murphy. In the 21st century, both Silver City and Ruby City are ghost towns, remnant of the mining boom.

== Etymology ==
The name "Owyhee" derives from an early anglicization of the Hawaiian term "Hawaii". When James Cook encountered what he named the Sandwich Islands (now the Hawaiian Islands) in 1778, he found them inhabited by Native Hawaiians, whom the Anglo-Americans referred to as "Owyhees". Noted for their hardy physique and maritime skills, numerous Native Hawaiians were hired as crew members aboard European and American vessels. Many Native Hawaiians sailed to the American Northwest coast and found employment along the Columbia River, where they joined trapping expeditions or worked at some of the fur trading posts.

In 1819, three Native Hawaiians joined Donald Mackenzie's Snake expedition, which went out annually into the Snake country for the North West Company, a Montreal-based organization of Canadian fur traders. The three Hawaiians left the main party during the winter of 1819–1820 to explore the then unknown terrain of what since has been called the Owyhee River and mountains. They disappeared and were presumed dead; no further information regarding their whereabouts has been found. In memory of these Native Hawaiians, British fur trappers started to call the region "Owyhee" and the name stuck.

== Geography ==
According to the U.S. Census Bureau, the county has a total area of 7,697 square miles (19,940 km^{2}), of which 7,666 square miles (19,850 km^{2}) is land and 31 square miles (80 km^{2}) (0.4%) is water. It is the second-largest county in Idaho by area.

Nearly all of the county is high intermountain desert, with plentiful sagebrush and basalt canyons. The Owyhee Mountains in the west dominate the landscape, with Hayden Peak reaching 8,403 feet (2,561 m) above sea level. The lowest elevation is at the county's northwest corner, where the Snake River is just above 2,000 feet (610 m) at the Oregon border. The Snake forms most of the county's northern border from Oregon to just west of Glenns Ferry in Elmore County. A tributary of the Snake is the Bruneau River, which flows north from Nevada through the eastern section of the county. The Owyhee River starts in the southwestern part of the county and flows westward into Oregon; it eventually enters the Snake at the state border, south of Nyssa.

=== Adjacent counties ===
- Canyon County – north
- Ada County – north
- Elmore County – north
- Twin Falls County – east
- Elko County, Nevada – south/Pacific Time Border
- Humboldt County, Nevada – southwest/Pacific Time Border
- Malheur County, Oregon – west

=== National protected areas ===
- Big Jacks Creek Wilderness
- Bruneau - Jarbidge Rivers Wilderness
- Deer Flat National Wildlife Refuge (part)
- Little Jacks Creek Wilderness
- North Fork Owyhee Wilderness
- Owyhee River Wilderness
- Pole Creek Wilderness
- Snake River Birds of Prey National Conservation Area (part)

== Demographics ==
Historical population
Census	Pop.	Note	%±
1870	1,713		—
1880	1,426		−16.8%
1890	2,021		41.7%
1900	3,804		88.2%
1910	4,044		6.3%
1920	4,694		16.1%
1930	4,103		−12.6%
1940	5,652		37.8%
1950	6,307		11.6%
1960	6,375		1.1%
1970	6,422		0.7%
1980	8,272		28.8%
1990	8,392		1.5%
2000	10,644		26.8%
2010	11,526		8.3%
2020	11,913		3.4%
2025 (est.)	12,661	▲	6.3%
U.S. Decennial Census; 1790–1960 1900–1990; 1990–2000 2010, 2020

=== Racial and ethnic composition ===
Owyhee County, Idaho – Racial and ethnic composition Note: the US Census treats Hispanic/Latino as an ethnic category. This table excludes Latinos from the racial categories and assigns them to a separate category. Hispanics/Latinos may be of any race.
Race / Ethnicity (NH = Non-Hispanic)	Pop 1980	Pop 1990	Pop 2000	Pop 2010	Pop 2020	% 1980	% 1990	% 2000	% 2010	% 2020
White alone (NH)	6,826	6,644	7,635	7,867	8,060	82.52%	79.17%	71.73%	68.25%	67.66%
Black or African American alone (NH)	47	22	7	18	28	0.57%	0.26%	0.07%	0.16%	0.24%
Native American or Alaska Native alone (NH)	272	240	309	432	374	3.29%	2.86%	2.90%	3.75%	3.14%
Asian alone (NH)	80	72	50	56	42	0.97%	0.86%	0.47%	0.49%	0.35%
Native Hawaiian or Pacific Islander alone (NH)	x	x	5	1	8	x	x	0.05%	0.01%	0.07%
Other race alone (NH)	6	6	20	14	68	0.07%	0.07%	0.19%	0.12%	0.57%
Mixed race or Multiracial (NH)	x	x	159	159	418	x	x	1.49%	1.38%	3.51%
Hispanic or Latino (any race)	1,041	1,408	2,459	2,979	2,915	12.58%	16.78%	23.10%	25.85%	24.47%
Total	8,272	8,392	10,644	11,526	11,913	100.00%	100.00%	100.00%	100.00%	100.00%

=== 2020 census ===
As of the 2020 census, the county had a population of 11,913. The median age was 38.8 years. 26.8% of residents were under the age of 18 and 17.9% of residents were 65 years of age or older. For every 100 females there were 104.8 males, and for every 100 females age 18 and over there were 103.7 males age 18 and over.

The racial makeup of the county was 72.9% White, 0.3% Black or African American, 3.5% American Indian and Alaska Native, 0.4% Asian, 0.1% Native Hawaiian and Pacific Islander, 12.2% from some other race, and 10.7% from two or more races. Hispanic or Latino residents of any race comprised 24.5% of the population.

0.0% of residents lived in urban areas, while 100.0% lived in rural areas.

There were 4,232 households in the county, of which 34.6% had children under the age of 18 living with them and 18.8% had a female householder with no spouse or partner present. About 22.7% of all households were made up of individuals and 11.3% had someone living alone who was 65 years of age or older.

There were 4,719 housing units, of which 10.3% were vacant. Among occupied housing units, 72.4% were owner-occupied and 27.6% were renter-occupied. The homeowner vacancy rate was 1.3% and the rental vacancy rate was 4.7%.

=== 2010 census ===
As of the 2010 U.S. census, there were 11,526 people, 4,076 households, and 2,954 families living in the county. The population density was 1.5 inhabitants per square mile (0.58/km^{2}). There were 4,781 housing units at an average density of 0.6 units per square mile (0.23 units/km^{2}). The racial makeup of the county was 76.0% white, 4.3% American Indian, 0.5% Asian, 0.2% black or African American, 16.6% from other races, and 2.4% from two or more races. Those of Hispanic or Latino origin made up 25.8% of the population. In terms of ancestry, 19.6% were American, 13.8% were German, 9.5% were English, and 9.4% were Irish.

Of the 4,076 households, 36.9% had children under the age of 18 living with them, 57.3% were married couples living together, 9.6% had a female householder with no husband present, 27.5% were non-families, and 23.0% of all households were made up of individuals. The average household size was 2.79 and the average family size was 3.29. The median age was 36.0 years.

The median income for a household in the county was $33,441 and the median income for a family was $36,405. Males had a median income of $31,404 versus $29,167 for females. The per capita income for the county was $17,373. About 18.0% of families and 22.2% of the population were below the poverty line, including 33.9% of those under age 18 and 10.8% of those age 65 or over.

=== 2000 census ===
As of the 2000 U.S. census, there were 10,644 people, 3,710 households, and 2,756 families living in the county. The population density was 1.4 person per square mile (0.54 person/km^{2}). There were 4,452 housing units at an average density of 1 units per square mile (0.39 units/km^{2}). The racial makeup of the county was 76.87% White, 0.15% Black or African American, 3.21% Native American, 0.47% Asian, 0.08% Pacific Islander, 16.50% from other races, and 2.72% from two or more races. 23.10% of the population were Hispanic or Latino of any race. 14.3% were of American, 12.5% German, 10.4% English, and 8.1% Irish ancestry.

There were 3,710 households, out of which 37.80% had children under the age of 18 living with them, 61.20% were married couples living together, 8.70% had a female householder with no husband present, and 25.70% were non-families. 21.80% of all households were made up of individuals, and 9.50% had someone living alone who was 65 years of age or older. The average household size was 2.85 and the average family size was 3.35.

In the county, the population was spread out, with 31.90% under the age of 18, 8.50% from 18 to 24, 26.50% from 25 to 44, 20.90% from 45 to 64, and 12.10% who were 65 years of age or older. The median age was 33 years. For every 100 females, there were 109.00 males. For every 100 females age 18 and over, there were 107.60 males.

The median income for a household in the county was $28,339, and the median income for a family was $32,856. Males had a median income of $25,146 versus $20,718 for females. The per capita income for the county was $13,405. About 14.20% of families and 16.90% of the population were below the poverty line, including 20.80% of those under age 18 and 12.10% of those age 65 or over.

== Media ==
- The Owyhee Avalanche County newspaper

== Communities ==
=== Cities ===
- Grand View
- Homedale
- Marsing

=== Census-designated places ===
- Bruneau
- Murphy

=== Unincorporated communities ===
- Claytonia
- Murphy Hot Springs
- Oreana
- Reynolds
- Riddle

=== Ghost towns ===
- De Lamar
- Dewey
- Dickshooter
- Grasmere
- Ruby City
- Silver City
- Wickahoney

== Politics ==
Although Owyhee County was amongst the most Democratic in the state in its early history, it has like most of Idaho gradually turned overwhelmingly Republican. In no presidential election since 1940 has the county selected the Democratic candidate, and no Democrat since Jimmy Carter in 1976 has won more than one-third of the county's vote.

United States presidential election results for Owyhee County, Idaho
Year	Republican		Democratic		Third party(ies)	
Year	No.	%	No.	%	No.	%
1892	337	49.34%	0	0.00%	346	50.66%
1896	97	7.84%	1,140	92.16%	0	0.00%
1900	584	39.78%	884	60.22%	0	0.00%
1904	663	55.02%	393	32.61%	149	12.37%
1908	604	45.07%	650	48.51%	86	6.42%
1912	515	33.84%	567	37.25%	440	28.91%
1916	594	40.44%	775	52.76%	100	6.81%
1920	971	65.34%	515	34.66%	0	0.00%
1924	564	36.53%	309	20.01%	671	43.46%
1928	918	62.20%	533	36.11%	25	1.69%
1932	583	36.21%	959	59.57%	68	4.22%
1936	500	28.94%	1,106	64.00%	122	7.06%
1940	1,031	46.76%	1,160	52.61%	14	0.63%
1944	983	54.04%	824	45.30%	12	0.66%
1948	969	50.03%	925	47.75%	43	2.22%
1952	1,813	70.41%	759	29.48%	3	0.12%
1956	1,468	62.95%	864	37.05%	0	0.00%
1960	1,500	57.06%	1,129	42.94%	0	0.00%
1964	1,216	51.01%	1,168	48.99%	0	0.00%
1968	1,385	59.62%	562	24.19%	376	16.19%
1972	1,630	70.14%	463	19.92%	231	9.94%
1976	1,519	57.52%	1,054	39.91%	68	2.57%
1980	2,257	71.88%	732	23.31%	151	4.81%
1984	2,141	77.71%	574	20.83%	40	1.45%
1988	1,707	64.81%	848	32.19%	79	3.00%
1992	1,469	47.82%	686	22.33%	917	29.85%
1996	2,033	61.18%	895	26.93%	395	11.89%
2000	2,450	76.85%	623	19.54%	115	3.61%
2004	2,859	79.64%	685	19.08%	46	1.28%
2008	3,024	74.52%	944	23.26%	90	2.22%
2012	2,794	75.03%	833	22.37%	97	2.60%
2016	3,052	77.76%	591	15.06%	282	7.18%
2020	3,819	80.52%	816	17.20%	108	2.28%
2024	4,101	82.85%	756	15.27%	93	1.88%

== Education ==
School districts include:

- Bruneau-Grand View Joint School District 365
- Castleford School District 417
- Glenns Ferry Joint School District 192
- Homedale Joint School District 370
- Marsing Joint School District 363
- Melba Joint School District 136
- Pleasant Valley Elementary School District 364
- Three Creek Joint Elementary School District 416

Residents in a portion of the county are in the area (but not the taxation zone) for College of Western Idaho. In the remainder, it is in the area (but not the taxation zone) for College of Southern Idaho.

== Healthcare ==
The county is served by the Southwest Idaho Health District.

== Gallery ==
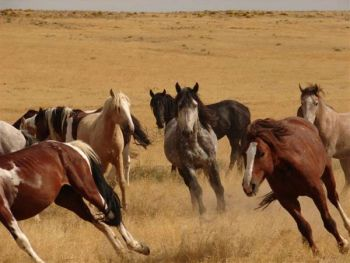
Wild Horses of Saylor Creek

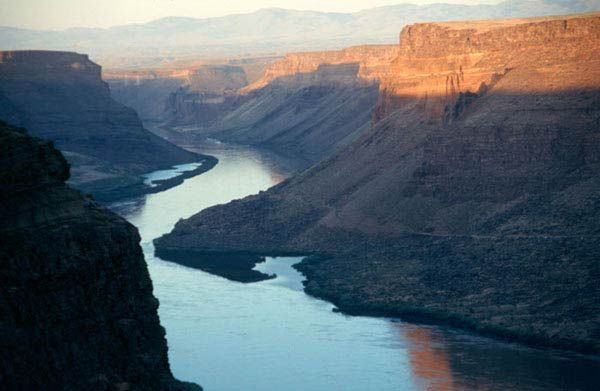
Snake River Birds of Prey National Conservation Area

== See also ==
- National Register of Historic Places listings in Owyhee County, Idaho
- List of counties in Idaho
