= Silver City, Idaho =

- Ghost town
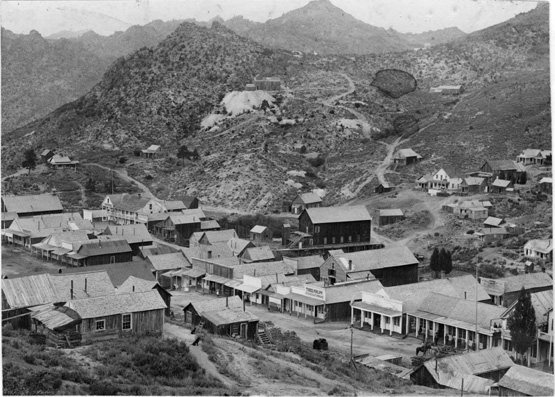
- Silver City in 1892

- Location within Idaho Location within the United States
- Coordinates: 43°01′01″N 116°43′59″W
- Country: United States
- State: Idaho
- County: Owyhee
- Elevation: 6,168 ft (1,880 m)
- Time zone: UTC-7 (Mountain (MST))
  - Summer (DST): UTC-6 (MDT)
- GNIS feature ID: 398130

Silver City is a ghost town in northwestern Owyhee County, Idaho, United States, that is listed on the National Register of Historic Places (NRHP). At its height in the 1880s, it was a gold and silver mining town with a population of around 2,500 and approximately 75 businesses.

== Description ==
Silver City served as county seat of Owyhee County from 1867 to 1934. Today, the town has about 70 standing buildings, all of which are privately owned. Many of the owners are third- or fourth-generation descendants of the original miners. There are a handful of small businesses, but no gas or service stations. The property is now owned by the federal government, overseen by the Bureau of Land Management.

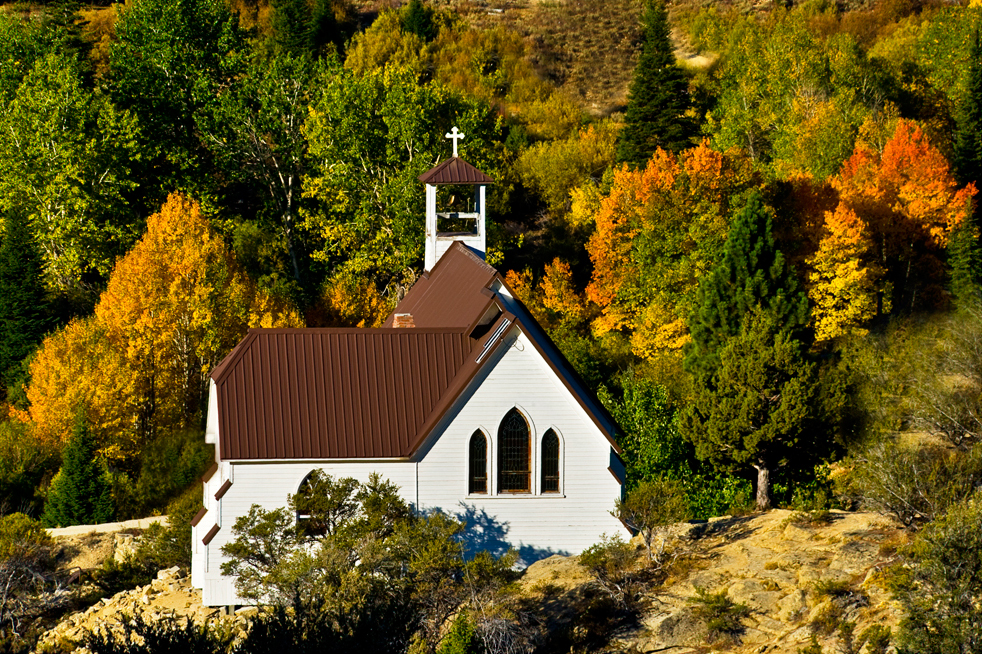
Our Lady of Tears, Silver City, 2010

Silver City was founded in 1864 soon after silver was discovered at nearby War Eagle Mountain (elev. 8,065 ft (2,458 m)). The settlement grew quickly and was soon considered one of the major cities in Idaho Territory. The first daily newspaper and telegraph office in Idaho Territory were established in Silver City. The town was also among the first places in present-day Idaho to receive electric and telephone service. Along with Idaho City in the Boise Basin, these mining areas accelerated the growth of the capital city of Boise as a staging and supply point.

The placer and quartz vein mines became depleted around the time Idaho became a state in 1890. Due in part to its extremely remote location, Silver City began a slow decline but was never completely abandoned. Small-scale mining continued off and on until World War II; the last mine to be operated all year round in Silver City was the "Potossi," managed by Ned Williams. By the 1940s, there was only one permanent resident, Willie Hawes (1876–1968), who was born in town and was its mayor, police chief, fire chief, postman, etc.

The Idaho Hotel in Silver City was restored and re-opened for tourists in 1972. It relies on the use of propane refrigerators and stoves in order to supply cold drinks and snacks or a complete meal to guests during the summer months. The rooms are fitted with indoor plumbing and furnished with antiques, making it a tourist destination.

In 1972, the townsite and its environs were listed on the National Register of Historic Places as a historic district, the Silver City Historic District, with a total area of 10,240 acres (16.0 sq mi; 41.4 km^{2}).

Historical population
Census	Pop.	Note	%±
1870	960		—
1880	593		−38.2%
1890	583		−1.7%
1900	976		67.4%
1910	650		−33.4%
1920	630		−3.1%
1930	183		−71.0%
1940	165		−9.8%
1950	110		−33.3%

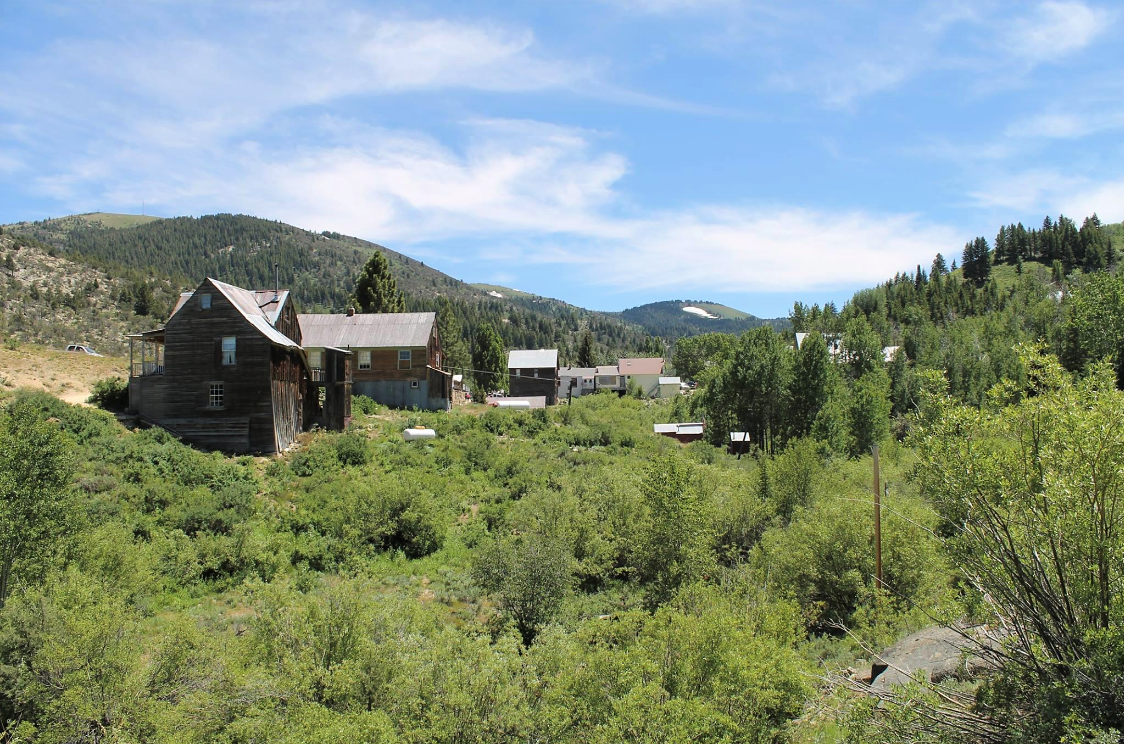
Silver City in 2016

== Geography ==
Silver City is located at an elevation of 6,179 feet (1,883 m) above sea level. It is located 25 miles (40 km) southwest of Murphy (elev. 2,820 feet (860 m)), the current county seat, via a dirt road.

== See also ==
- List of ghost towns in Idaho
- National Register of Historic Places listings in Owyhee County, Idaho
