= Trinity (nuclear test) =

First detonation of a nuclear weapon

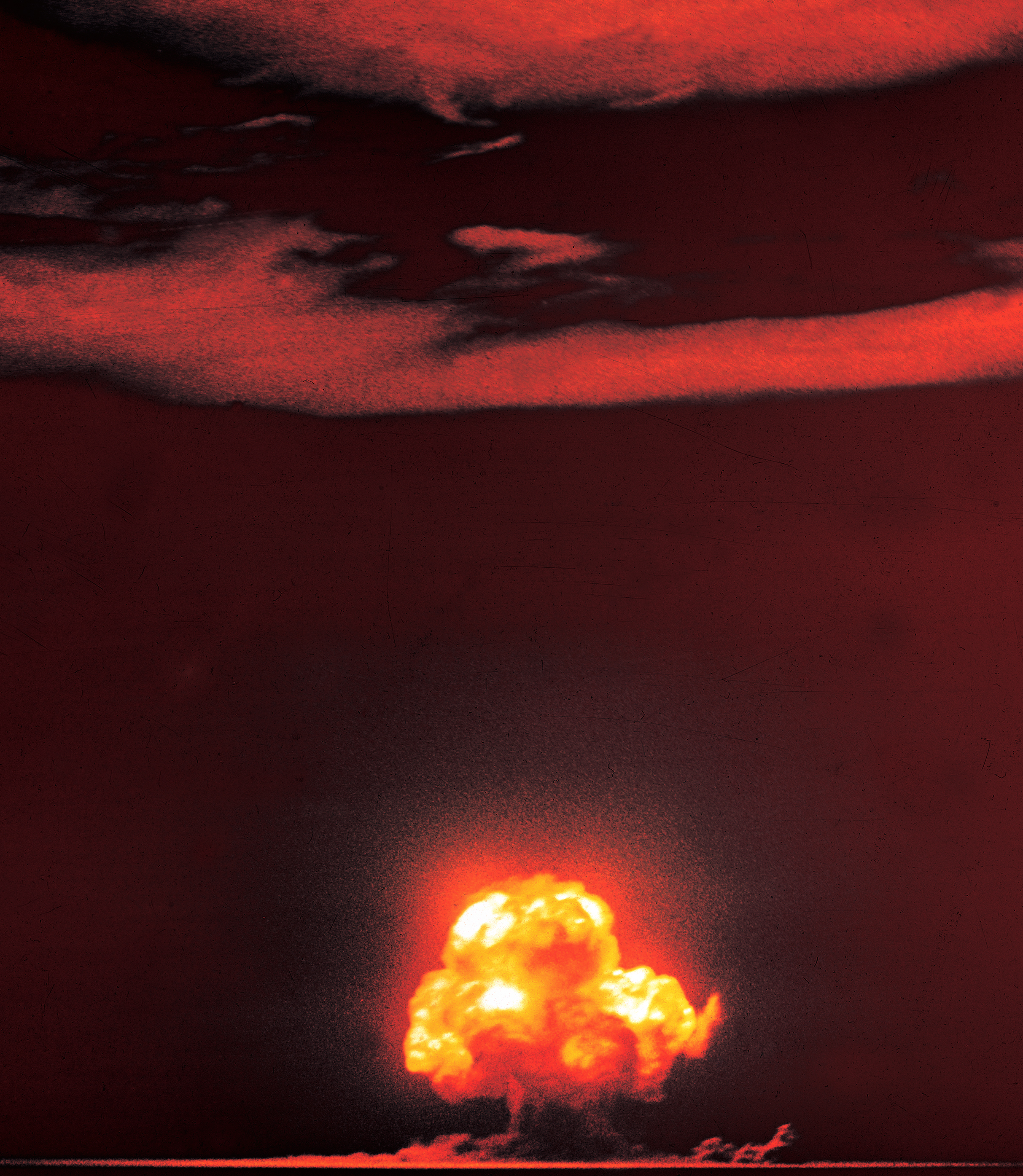
- The only well-exposed color photograph of the Trinity test detonation, taken by Jack Aeby

Information
- Country: United States
- Test site: Trinity Site, New Mexico
- Date: July 16, 1945 (81 years ago)
- Test type: Atmospheric
- Device type: Plutonium implosion fission
- Yield: 25 kt (100 TJ)

Test chronology

- Trinity Site
- U.S. National Register of Historic Places
- U.S. National Historic Landmark District
- NM State Register of Cultural Properties
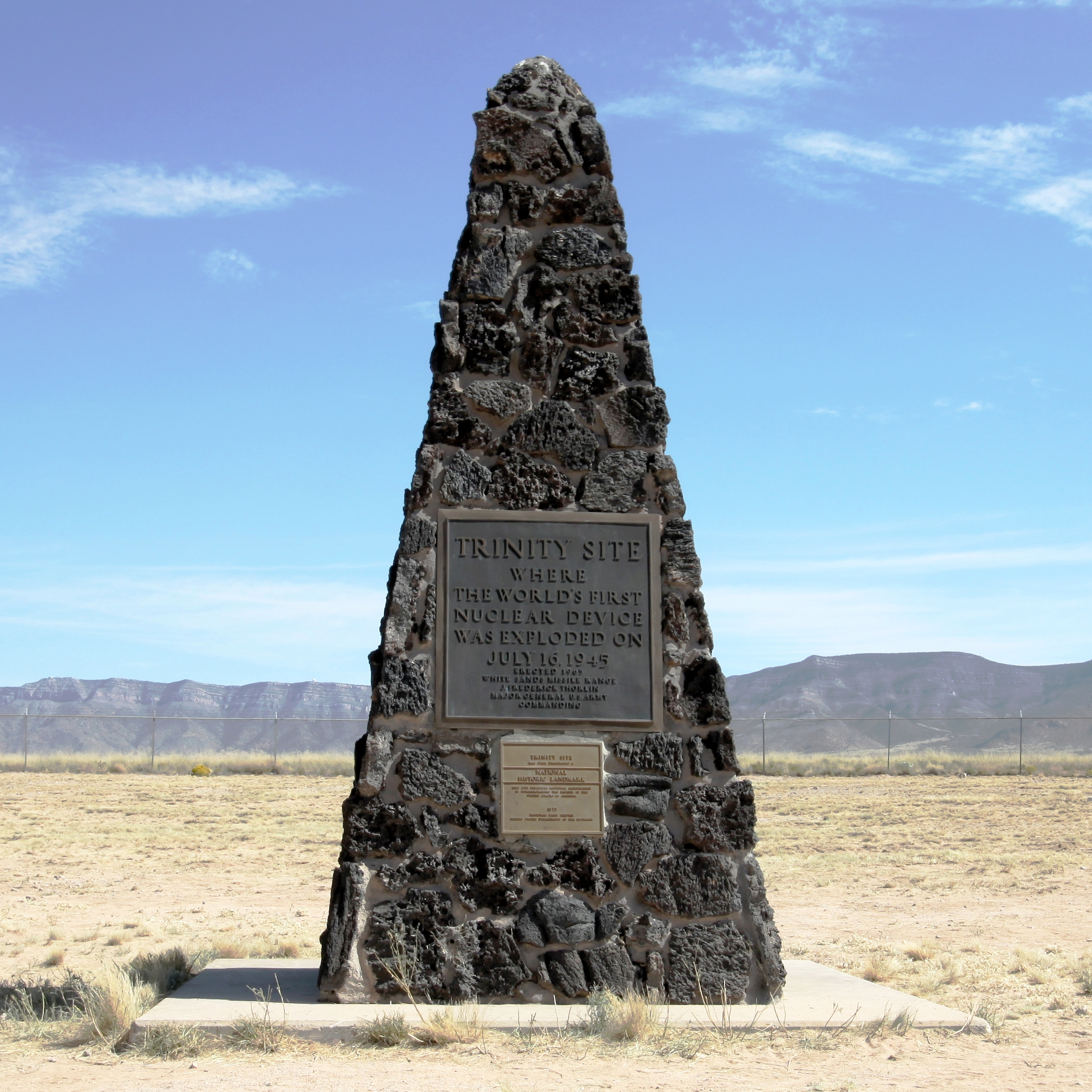
- Trinity Site obelisk

- Location within New Mexico Location within the United States
- Nearest city: Bingham, New Mexico
- Coordinates: 33°40′38″N 106°28′31″W
- Area: 36,480 acres (14,760 ha)
- Built: 1945
- NRHP reference No.: 66000493
- NMSRCP No.: 30

Significant dates
- Date of nuclear explosion: July 16, 1945
- Added to NRHP: October 15, 1966
- Designated NHLD: December 21, 1965
- Designated NMSRCP: December 20, 1968

Trinity was the first detonation of a nuclear weapon, conducted by the United States Army at 5:29 a.m. Mountain War Time (Note: Mountain War Time (MWT) was six hours behind Greenwich Mean Time (GMT), the predecessor of Coordinated Universal Time (UTC).) (11:29:21 GMT) on July 16, 1945, as part of the Manhattan Project. The test was of an implosion-design plutonium bomb, or "gadget" – the same design as the Fat Man bomb later detonated over Nagasaki, Japan, on August 9, 1945. Concerns about whether the complex Fat Man design would work led to a decision to conduct the first nuclear test. The code name "Trinity" was assigned by J. Robert Oppenheimer, the director of the Los Alamos Laboratory. The name was possibly inspired by the poetry of John Donne.

Planned and directed by Kenneth Bainbridge, the test was conducted in the Jornada del Muerto desert about 35 miles (56 km) southeast of Socorro, New Mexico, on what was the Alamogordo Bombing and Gunnery Range, but was renamed the White Sands Proving Ground just before the test. The only structures originally in the immediate vicinity were the McDonald Ranch House and its ancillary buildings, which scientists used as a laboratory for testing bomb components.

Fears of a fizzle prompted construction of "Jumbo", a steel containment vessel that could contain the plutonium, allowing it to be recovered, but Jumbo was not used in the test. On May 7, 1945, a rehearsal was conducted, during which 108 short tons (98 t) of high explosive spiked with radioactive isotopes was detonated.

425 people were present on the weekend of the Trinity test. In addition to Bainbridge and Oppenheimer, observers included Vannevar Bush, James Chadwick, James B. Conant, Thomas Farrell, Enrico Fermi, Hans Bethe, Richard Feynman, Isidor Isaac Rabi, Leslie Groves, Philip Morrison, Frank Oppenheimer, Geoffrey Taylor, Richard Tolman, Edward Teller, and John von Neumann. The Trinity bomb released the explosive energy of 25 kilotons of TNT (100 TJ) ± 2 kilotons of TNT (8.4 TJ), and a large cloud of fallout. The test was conducted without evacuating nearby residents. Postwar radiation safety guidelines, developed in part from Trinity data, would have required evacuation at those distances. The test site was declared a National Historic Landmark district in 1965 and listed on the National Register of Historic Places the following year.

== Background ==
The creation of nuclear weapons arose from the scientific and political developments of the 1930s. The decade saw many new discoveries about the nature of atoms, including the existence of nuclear fission. The concurrent rise of fascist governments in Europe led to a fear of a German nuclear weapon project, especially among scientists who were refugees from Nazi Germany and other fascist countries. When their calculations showed that nuclear weapons were theoretically feasible, the British and United States governments supported an all-out effort to build them.

These efforts were transferred to the authority of the U.S. Army in June 1942 and became the Manhattan Project. Brigadier General Leslie R. Groves, Jr. was appointed its director in September. The weapons development portion of this project was located at the Los Alamos Laboratory in northern New Mexico, under the directorship of physicist J. Robert Oppenheimer. The University of Chicago, Columbia University, and the Radiation Laboratory at the University of California, Berkeley, conducted other development work.

Manhattan Project scientists had identified two fissile isotopes for potential use in bombs: uranium-235 and plutonium-239. Uranium-235 became the basis of the Little Boy bomb design, first used (without prior testing) in the bombing of Hiroshima; the design used in the Trinity test, and eventually used in the bombing of Nagasaki (Fat Man), was based on plutonium. The original design considered for a weapon based on plutonium-239 was Thin Man, in which (as in the Little Boy uranium bomb) two subcritical masses of fissile material would be brought rapidly together to form a single critical mass.

Plutonium is a synthetic element with complicated properties about which little was known at first, as until 1944 it had been produced only in cyclotrons in very pure microgram amounts, whereas a weapon would require kilogram quantities bred in a reactor. In April 1944, Los Alamos physicist Emilio Segrè discovered that plutonium produced by the X-10 Graphite Reactor at Clinton Engineer Works contained plutonium-240 as an impurity. Plutonium-240 undergoes spontaneous fission at thousands of times the rate of plutonium-239, and the extra neutrons thereby released made it likely that plutonium in a gun-type fission weapon would detonate too soon after a critical mass was formed, producing a "fizzle"—a nuclear explosion many times smaller than a full explosion. The Thin Man design would therefore not work.

Project scientists then turned to a more technically difficult implosion design. In September 1943, mathematician John von Neumann had proposed surrounding a fissile "core" by two different high explosives which produced shock waves of different speeds. Alternating the faster- and slower-burning explosives in a carefully calculated configuration would produce a compressive wave upon their simultaneous detonation. This so-called "explosive lens" focused the shock waves inward with sufficient force to rapidly compress the solid plutonium core to several times its original density. The increase in density caused the core – previously subcritical – to become supercritical. At the same time, the shock wave activated a small neutron source at the center of the core, thereby assuring that the chain reaction would begin in earnest immediately at the moment of compression. Such a complicated design required substantial research and experimentation in engineering and hydrodynamics, and in August 1944 the entire Los Alamos Laboratory was reorganized to focus on this work.

== Preparation ==
=== Decision ===
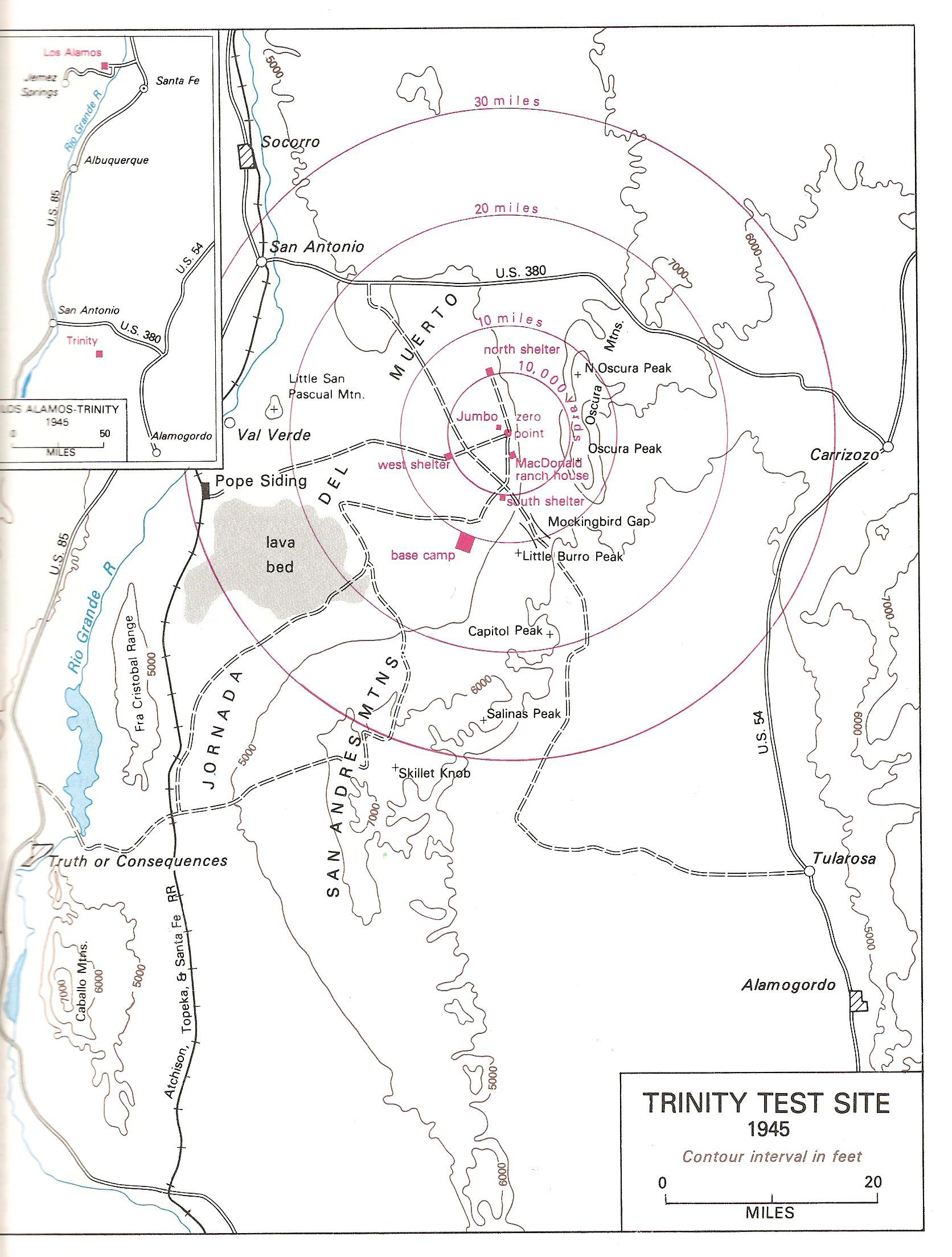
Map of the Trinity Site

The idea of testing the implosion device was brought up in discussions at Los Alamos in January 1944 and attracted enough support for Oppenheimer to approach Groves. Groves gave approval, but he had concerns. The Manhattan Project had spent a great deal of money and effort to produce the plutonium, and he wanted to know whether there would be a way to recover it. The Laboratory's Governing Board then directed Norman Ramsey to investigate how this could be done. In February 1944, Ramsey proposed a small-scale test in which the explosion was limited in size by reducing the number of generations of chain reactions, and that it take place inside a sealed containment vessel from which the plutonium could be recovered.

The means of generating such a controlled reaction were uncertain, and the data obtained would not be as useful as that from a full-scale explosion. Oppenheimer argued that the bomb "must be tested in a range where the energy release is comparable with that contemplated for final use." In March 1944, he obtained Groves's tentative approval for testing a full-scale explosion inside a containment vessel, although Groves was still worried about how he would explain the loss of "a billion dollars worth" of plutonium in the event the test failed.

=== Code name ===
The origin of the code name "Trinity" for the test is unknown, but it is often attributed to Oppenheimer as a reference to the poetry of John Donne, which in turn references the Christian belief of the Trinity. In 1962, Groves wrote to Oppenheimer about the origin of the name, asking if he had chosen it because it was a name common to rivers and peaks in the West and would not attract attention, and elicited this reply:

I did suggest it, but not on that ground ... Why I chose the name is not clear, but I know what thoughts were in my mind. There is a poem of John Donne, written just before his death, which I know and love. From it a quotation: "As West and East / In all flatt Maps – and I am one – are one, / So death doth touch the Resurrection." (Note: From the poem "Hymn to God, My God, in My Sickness") That still does not make a Trinity, but in another, better known devotional poem Donne opens: "Batter my heart, three person'd God." (Note: Holy Sonnets, Holy Sonnet 14)

=== Organization ===
In March 1944, planning for the test was assigned to Kenneth Bainbridge, a professor of physics at Harvard University, working under explosives expert George Kistiakowsky. Bainbridge's group was known as the E-9 (Explosives Development) Group. Stanley Kershaw, formerly from the National Safety Council, was made responsible for safety. Captain Samuel P. Davalos, the assistant post engineer at Los Alamos, was placed in charge of construction. First Lieutenant Harold C. Bush became commander of the Base Camp at Trinity. Scientists William Penney, Victor Weisskopf and Philip Moon were consultants. Eventually seven subgroups were formed:

- TR-1 (Services) under John H. Williams
- TR-2 (Shock and Blast) under John H. Manley
- TR-3 (Measurements) under Robert R. Wilson
- TR-4 (Meteorology) under J. M. Hubbard
- TR-5 (Spectrographic and Photographic) under Julian E. Mack
- TR-6 (Airborne Measurements) under Bernard Waldman
- TR-7 (Medical) under Louis H. Hempelmann

The E-9 group was renamed the X-2 (Development, Engineering and Tests) Group in the August 1944 reorganization.

=== Test site ===
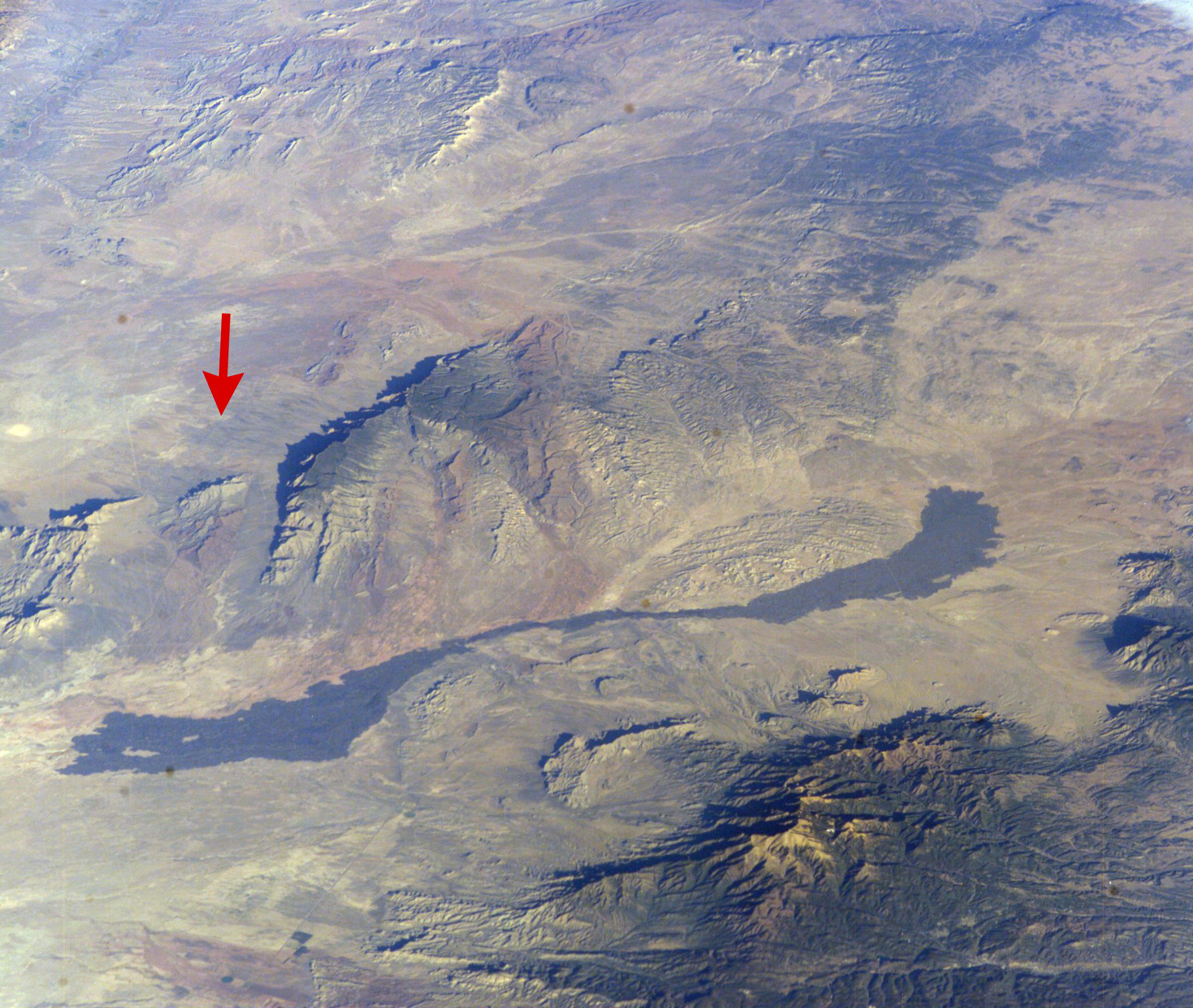
Trinity Site (red arrow) near Carrizozo Malpais

Safety and security required a remote, isolated and unpopulated area. The scientists also wanted a flat area to minimize secondary effects of the blast, and with little wind to spread radioactive fallout. Eight candidate sites were considered: the Tularosa Valley; the Jornada del Muerto Valley; the area southwest of Cuba, New Mexico, and north of Thoreau; and the lava flats of the El Malpais National Monument, all in New Mexico; the San Luis Valley near the Great Sand Dunes National Monument in Colorado; the Desert Training Area and San Nicolas Island in Southern California; and the sand bars of Padre Island, Texas.

The sites were surveyed by car and by air by Bainbridge, R. W. Henderson, Major W. A. Stevens, and Major Peer de Silva. The site finally chosen on September 7, 1944, after consulting with Major General Uzal Ent, the commander of the Second Air Force, lay at the northern end of the Alamogordo Bombing Range, in Socorro County near the towns of Carrizozo and San Antonio (33°40.636′N 106°28.525′W). The Alamogordo Bombing Range was renamed the White Sands Proving Ground on July 9, 1945, one week before the test. Despite the criterion that the site be isolated, nearly half a million people lived within 150 miles (240 km) of the test site; soon after the Trinity test, the Manhattan Project's chief medical officer, Colonel Stafford L. Warren, recommended that future tests be conducted at least 150 miles from populated areas.

The only structures in the vicinity were the McDonald Ranch House and its ancillary buildings, about 2 miles (3.2 km) to the southeast. Like the rest of the Alamogordo Bombing Range, it had been acquired by the government in 1942. The patented land had been condemned and grazing rights suspended. Scientists used this as a laboratory for testing bomb components. Bainbridge and Davalos drew up plans for a base camp with accommodation and facilities for 160 personnel, along with the technical infrastructure to support the test. A construction firm from Lubbock, Texas, built the barracks, officers' quarters, mess hall and other basic facilities. The requirements expanded, and by July 1945, 250 people worked at the Trinity test site. On the weekend of the test, there were 425 present.

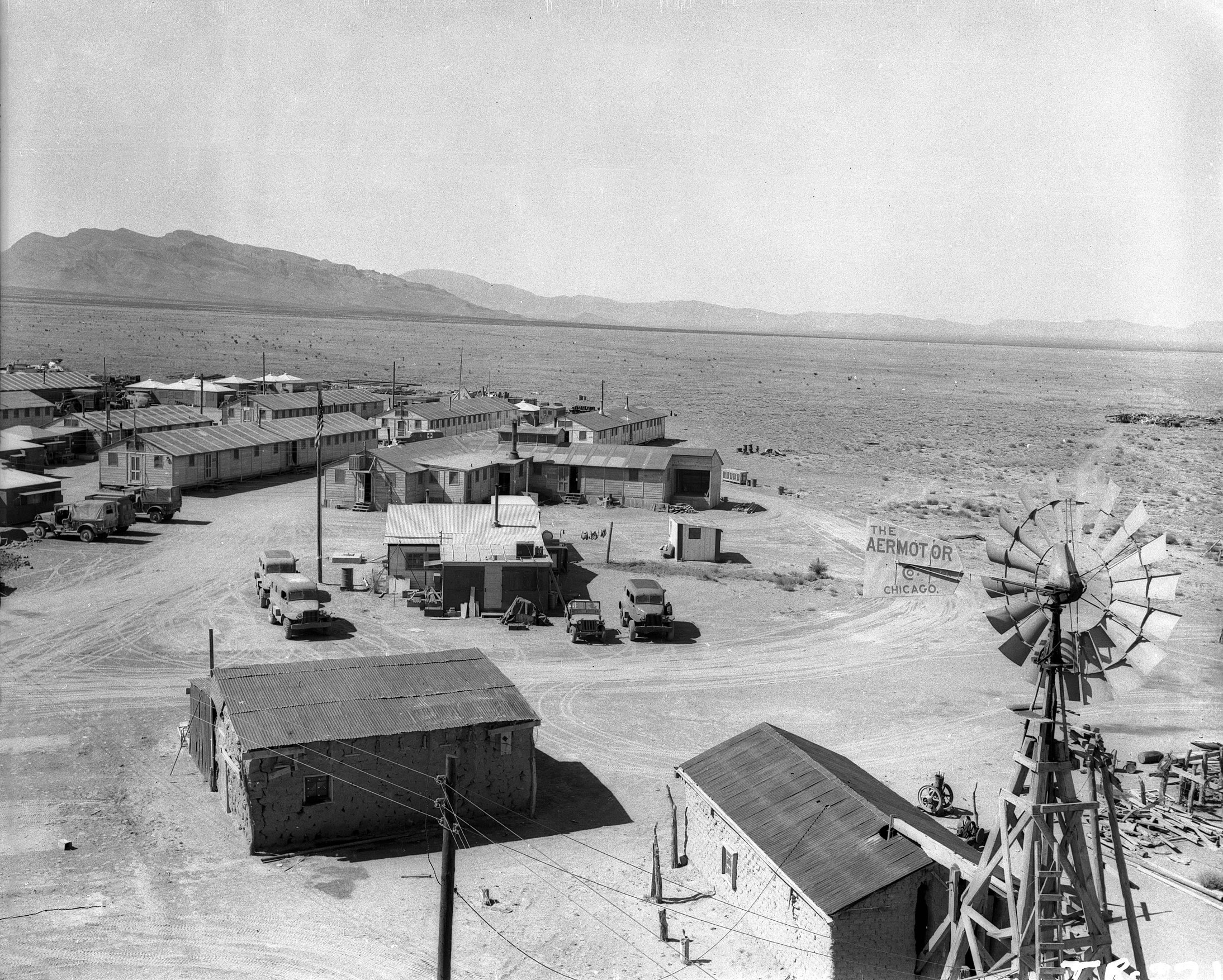
The Trinity test base camp

Lieutenant Bush's twelve-man MP unit arrived at the site from Los Alamos on December 30, 1944. This unit established initial security checkpoints and horse patrols. The distances around the site proved too great for the horses, so they were repurposed for polo playing, and the MPs resorted to using jeeps and trucks for transportation. Maintenance of morale among men working long hours under harsh conditions along with dangerous reptiles and insects was a challenge. Bush strove to improve the food and accommodation and to provide organized games and nightly movies.

Throughout 1945, other personnel arrived at the Trinity Site to help prepare for the bomb test. They tried to use water out of the ranch wells, but found the water so alkaline, it was not drinkable. They were forced to use U.S. Navy saltwater soap and hauled drinking water in from the firehouse in Socorro. Gasoline and diesel were purchased from the Standard Oil plant there. Freshwater was trucked in, 700 US gallons (2,600 L; 580 imp gal) per load, from 40 miles (64 km) away. Military and civilian construction personnel built warehouses, workshops, a magazine and commissary. The railroad siding at Pope, New Mexico, was upgraded by adding an unloading platform. Roads were built, and 200 miles (320 km) of telephone wire were strung. Electricity was supplied by portable generators. Bomb shelters to protect test observers were the most expensive to construct.

Due to its proximity to the bombing range, the base camp was accidentally bombed twice in May. When the lead plane on a practice night raid accidentally knocked out the generator or otherwise doused the lights illuminating their target, they went in search of the lights, and since they had not been informed of the presence of the Trinity base camp, and it was lit, they bombed it instead. The accidental bombing damaged the stables and the carpentry shop, and a small fire resulted.

=== Jumbo ===
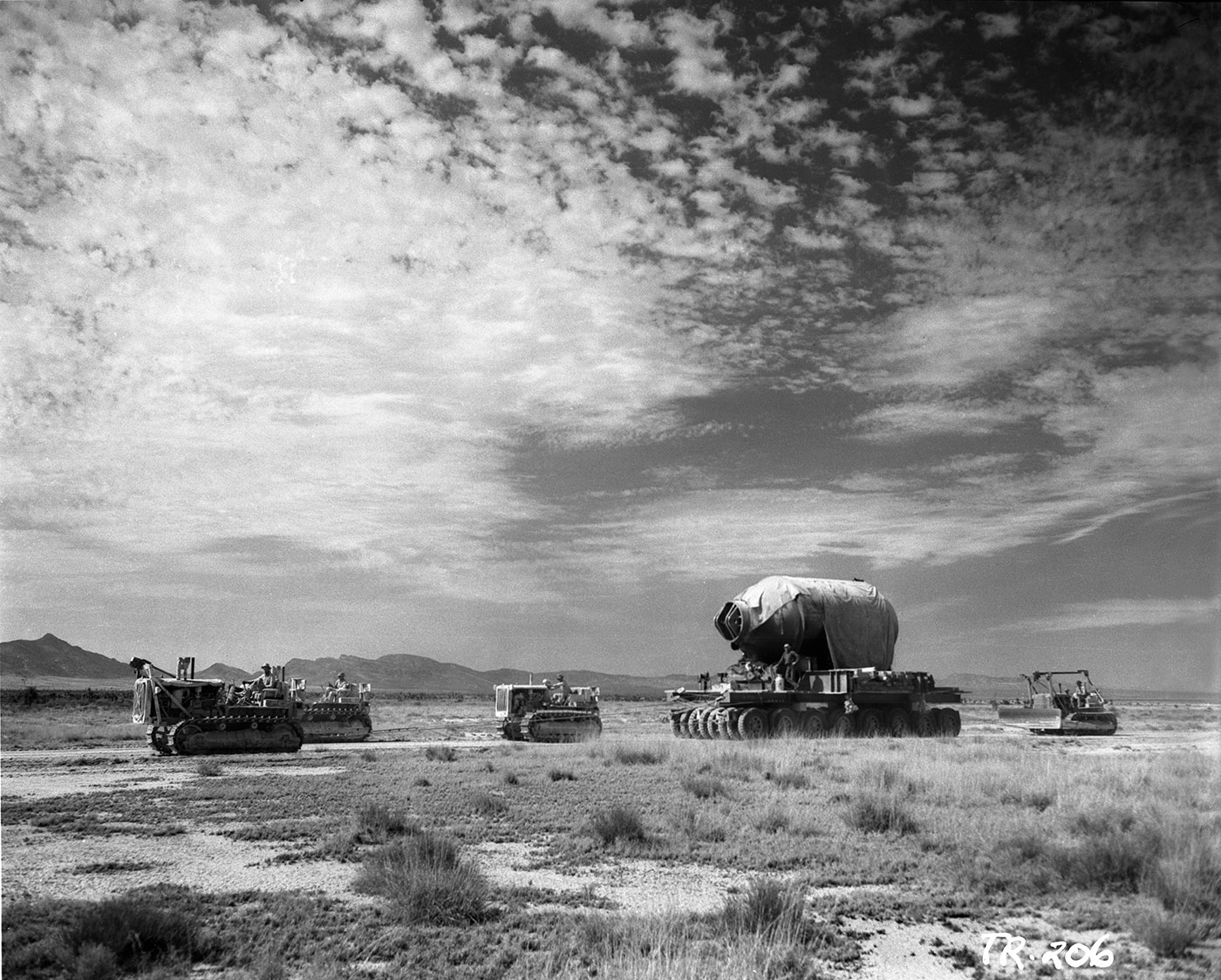
Jumbo arrives at the site

Responsibility for the design of a containment vessel for an unsuccessful explosion, known as "Jumbo", was assigned to Robert W. Henderson and Roy W. Carlson of the Los Alamos Laboratory's X-2A Section. The bomb would be placed into the heart of Jumbo, and if the bomb's detonation was unsuccessful the walls of Jumbo would not be breached, making it possible to recover the bomb's plutonium. Hans Bethe, Victor Weisskopf, and Joseph O. Hirschfelder made the initial calculations, followed by a more detailed analysis by Henderson and Carlson. They drew up specifications for a steel sphere 13 to 15 feet (3.96 to 4.57 m) in diameter, weighing 150 short tons (140 t) and capable of handling a pressure of 50,000 pounds per square inch (340,000 kPa). After consulting with the steel companies and the railroads, which would transport the vessel, Carlson produced a scaled-back cylindrical design that would be much easier to manufacture. Carlson identified a company that normally made boilers for the Navy, Babcock & Wilcox; they had made something similar and were willing to attempt its manufacture.

As delivered in May 1945, Jumbo was 10 feet (3.05 m) in diameter and 25 feet (7.62 m) long with walls 14 inches (356 mm) thick, and weighed 214 short tons (191 long tons; 194 t). A special train brought it from the Babcock & Wilcox plant in Barberton, Ohio, to the siding at Pope, where it was loaded on a large trailer and towed 25 miles (40 km) across the desert by crawler tractors. At the time, it was the heaviest item ever shipped by rail.

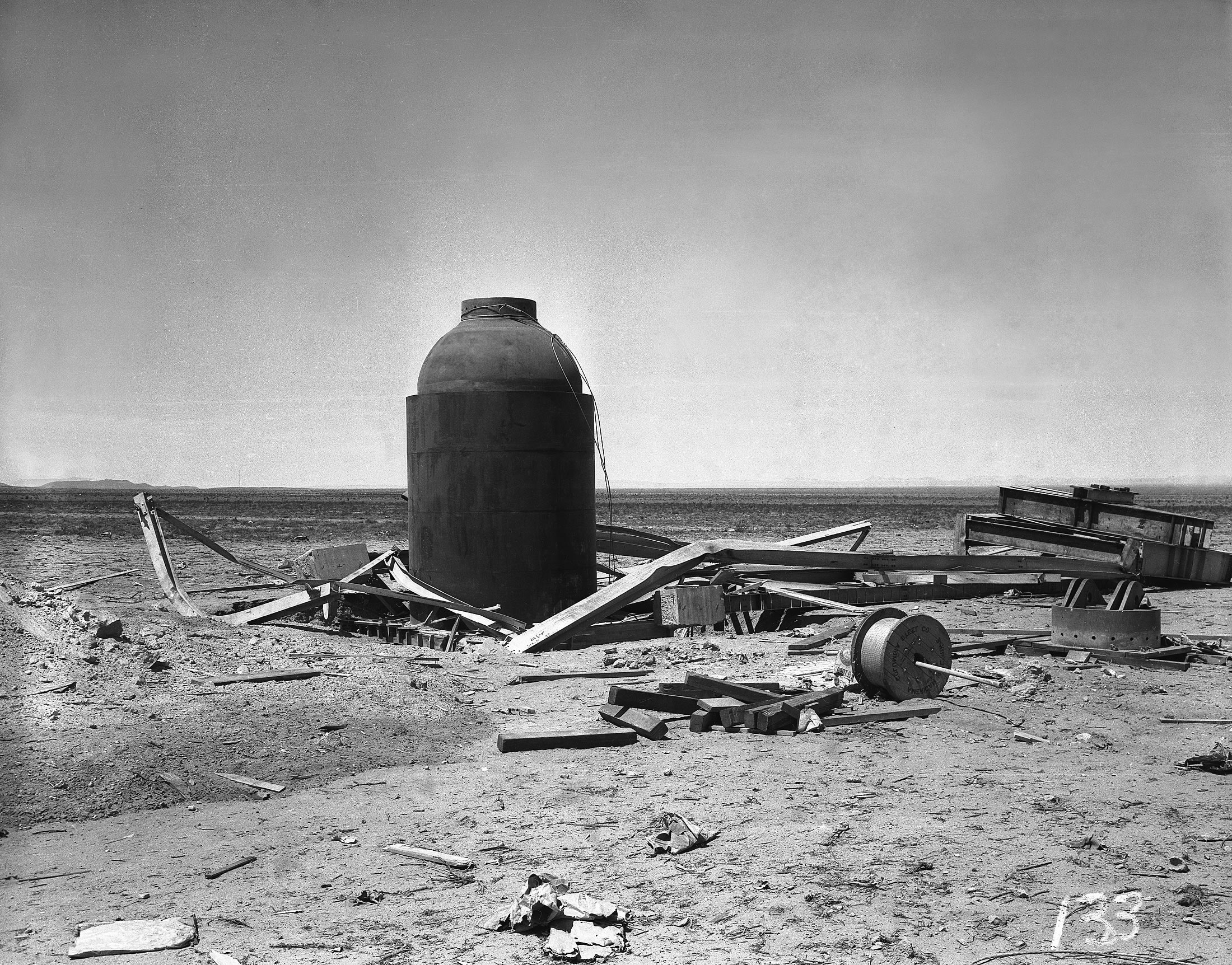
Jumbo was not used for its originally intended purpose in the Trinity test but was in a tower some distance from the bomb when it went off.

For many of the Los Alamos scientists, Jumbo was "the physical manifestation of the lowest point in the Laboratory's hopes for the success of an implosion bomb." By the time it arrived, the reactors at the Hanford Engineer Works produced plutonium in quantity, and Oppenheimer was confident that there would be enough for a second test. The use of Jumbo would interfere with the gathering of data on the explosion, the primary objective of the test. An explosion of more than 500 tons of TNT (2,100 GJ) would vaporize the steel and make it difficult to measure the thermal effects. Even 100 tons of TNT (420 GJ) would send fragments flying, presenting a hazard to personnel and measuring equipment. It was therefore decided not to use it. Instead, it was hoisted up a steel tower 800 yards (732 m) from the explosion, where it could be used for a subsequent test. In the end, Jumbo survived the explosion, although its tower did not.

Jumbo was destroyed on April 16, 1946, when an Army ordnance team detonated eight 500 lb bombs in the bottom of the steel container. Jumbo, with its steel banding around the middle, had been designed to contain the 5,000 lbs of high explosive in the atomic bomb while it was suspended in the center of the vessel. With the conventional bombs placed in the bottom of Jumbo, the resulting blast sent fragments flying in all directions as far as three quarters of a mile. Who authorized the destruction of Jumbo remains controversial. The rusting skeleton of Jumbo sits in the parking lot at the Trinity site on the White Sands Missile Range, where it was moved in 1979.

The development team also considered other methods of recovering active material in the event of a dud explosion. One idea was to cover it with a cone of sand. Another was to suspend the bomb in a tank of water. As with Jumbo, it was decided not to proceed with these means of containment. The CM-10 (Chemistry and Metallurgy) group at Los Alamos also studied how the active material could be chemically recovered after a contained or failed explosion.

=== 100-ton test ===
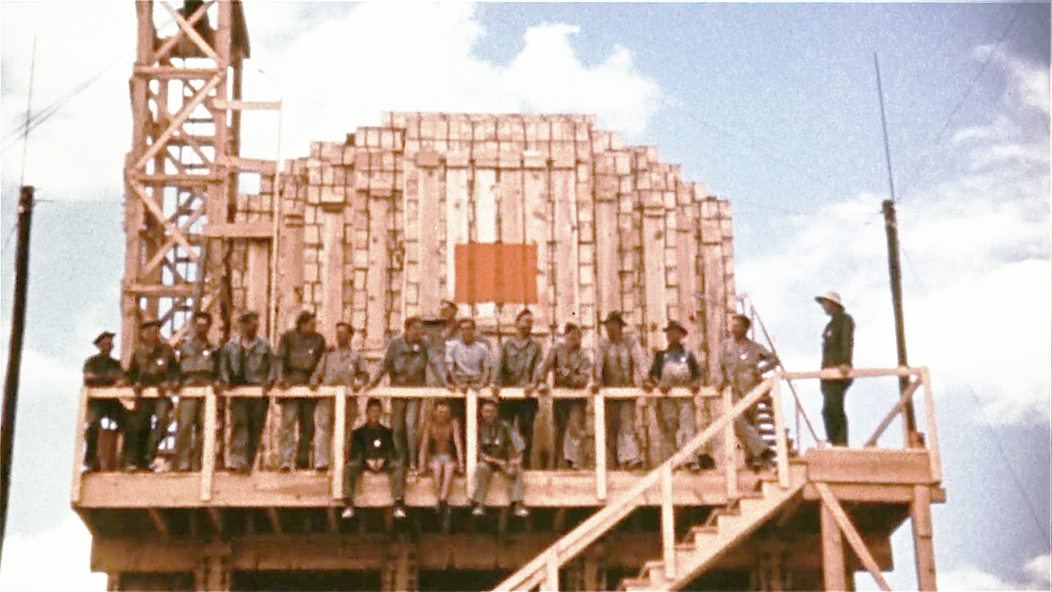
100-ton conventional explosives rehearsal test, Trinity

Because there would be only one chance to carry out the test correctly, Bainbridge decided that a rehearsal should be carried out to allow the plans and procedures to be verified, and the instrumentation to be tested and calibrated. Oppenheimer was initially skeptical but gave permission, and he later agreed that it contributed to the success of the Trinity test.

A 20-foot-high (6 m) wooden platform was constructed 800 yards (730 m) to the southeast of Trinity ground zero. The high explosive was piled in its wooden shipping boxes in the shape of a pseudo-octagonal prism on it. The charge consisted of 89.75 short tons (81.42 t) tons of TNT and 14.91 short tons (13.53 t) tons of Composition B (with the total explosive power of approximately 108 tons of TNT (450 GJ)), actually a few tons more than the stated "100-tons". Kistiakowsky assured Bainbridge that the explosives used were not susceptible to shock. This was proven correct when some boxes fell off the elevator lifting them up to the platform. Flexible tubing was threaded through the pile of boxes of explosives. A radioactive slug from Hanford with 1,000 curies (37 TBq) of beta ray activity and 400 curies (15 TBq) of gamma ray activity was dissolved, and Hempelmann poured the solution into the tubing.

The test was scheduled for May 5 but was postponed for two days to allow for more equipment to be installed. Requests for further postponements had to be refused because they would have affected the schedule for the main test. The detonation time was set for 04:00 Mountain War Time (MWT), on May 7, but there was a 37-minute delay to allow the observation plane, a Boeing B-29 Superfortress from the 216th Army Air Forces Base Unit flown by Major Clyde "Stan" Shields, to get into position.

Men stack crates of high explosives for the 100-ton test.

The fireball of the conventional explosion was visible from Alamogordo Army Air Field 60 miles (100 km) away, but there was little shock at the base camp 10 miles (16 km) away. Shields thought that the explosion looked "beautiful", but it was hardly felt at 15,000 feet (4,600 m). Herbert L. Anderson practiced using a converted M4 Sherman tank lined with lead to approach the 5-foot-deep (1.5 m) and 30-foot-wide (9 m) blast crater and take a soil sample, although the radioactivity was low enough to allow several hours of unprotected exposure. An electrical signal of unknown origin caused the explosion to go off 0.25 seconds early, ruining experiments that required split-second timing. The piezoelectric gauges developed by Anderson's team correctly indicated an explosion of 108 tons of TNT, but Luis Alvarez and Waldman's airborne condenser gauges were far less accurate.

In addition to uncovering scientific and technological issues, the rehearsal test revealed practical concerns as well. Over 100 vehicles were used for the rehearsal test, but it was realized more would be required for the main test, and they would need better roads and repair facilities. More radios and more telephone lines were required. Lines needed to be buried to prevent damage by vehicles. A teletype was installed to allow better communication with Los Alamos. A town hall was built to allow for large conferences and briefings, and the mess hall had to be upgraded. Because dust thrown up by vehicles interfered with some of the instrumentation, 20 miles (32 km) of road were sealed.

=== The bomb ===
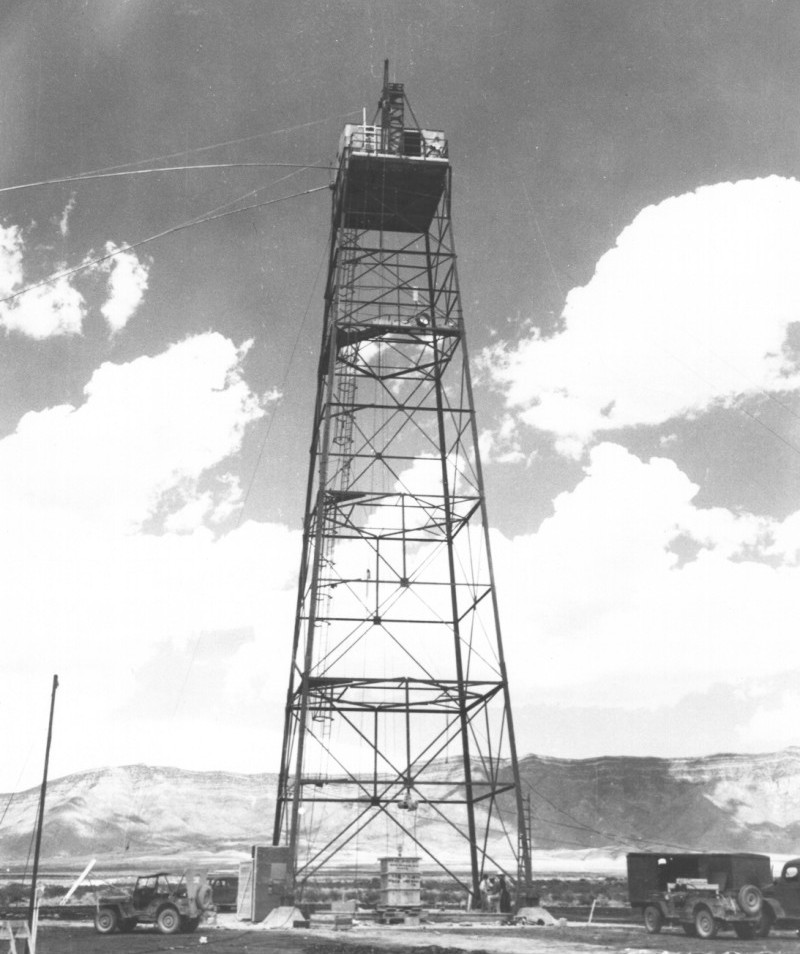
The 30-metre (100 ft) "shot tower" constructed for the test

The term "gadget"—a laboratory euphemism for a bomb—gave the laboratory's weapon physics division, "G Division", its name in August 1944. At that time it did not refer specifically to the Trinity Test device as that had yet to be developed, but once it was, it became the laboratory code name. The Trinity bomb was officially a Y-1561 device, as was the Fat Man used later in the bombing of Nagasaki. The two were very similar, though the Trinity bomb lacked fuzing and external ballistic casing. The bombs were still under development, and small changes continued to be made to the Fat Man design.

To keep the design as simple as possible, a nearly solid spherical core was chosen rather than a hollow one, although calculations showed that a hollow core would be more efficient in its use of plutonium. The core was compressed to prompt super-criticality by the implosion generated by the high explosive lens. This design became known as a "Christy Core" or "Christy pit" after physicist Robert F. Christy, who made the solid pit design a reality after it was initially proposed by Edward Teller.

Of the several allotropes of plutonium, the metallurgists preferred the malleable δ (delta) phase. This was stabilized at room temperature by alloying it with 5% gallium. Two equal hemispheres of plutonium-gallium alloy were plated with silver, and designated by serial numbers HS-1 and HS-2. The 6.19-kilogram (13.6 lb) radioactive core generated 15 W of heat, which warmed it up to about 100 to 110 °F (38 to 43 °C), and the silver plating developed blisters that had to be filed down and covered with gold foil; later cores were plated with nickel instead.

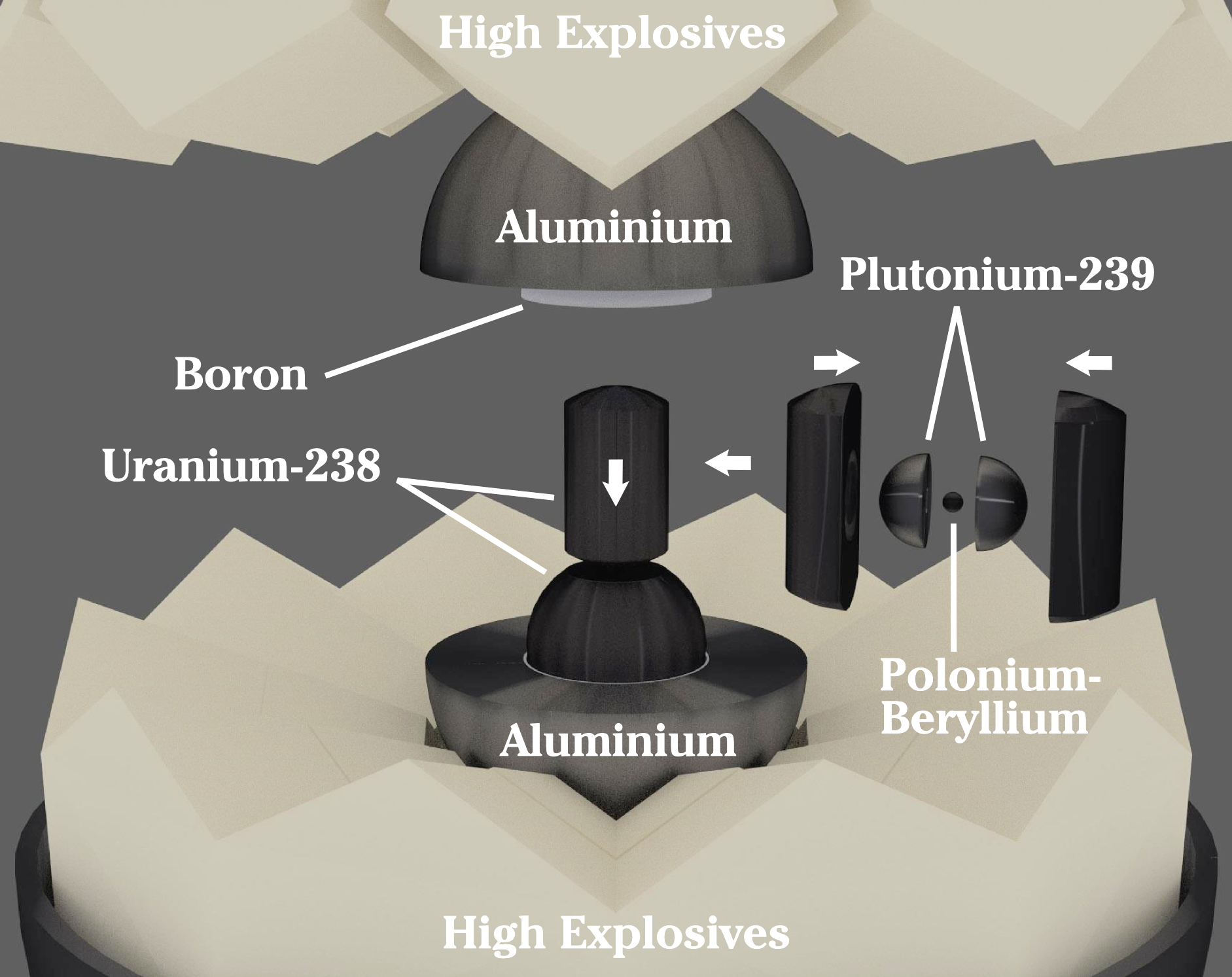
Basic nuclear components of the bomb. The uranium slug containing the plutonium sphere was inserted late in the assembly process.

A trial assembly of the bomb, without active components or explosive lenses, was carried out by the bomb assembly team headed by Norris Bradbury at Los Alamos on July 3. It was driven to Trinity and back. A set of explosive lenses arrived on July 7, followed by a second set on July 10. Each was examined by Bradbury and Kistiakowsky, and the best ones were selected for use. The remainder were handed over to Edward Creutz, who conducted a test detonation at Pajarito Canyon near Los Alamos without nuclear material. Magnetic measurements from this test suggested that the implosion might be insufficiently simultaneous and the bomb would fail. Bethe worked through the night to assess the results and reported that they were consistent with a perfect explosion.

Assembly of the nuclear capsule began on July 13 at the McDonald Ranch House, where the master bedroom had been turned into a clean room. The polonium-beryllium "Urchin" initiator was assembled, and Louis Slotin placed it inside the two hemispheres of the plutonium core. Cyril Smith then placed the core in the natural uranium tamper plug, or "slug". Air gaps were filled with 0.5-mil (0.013 mm) gold foil, and the two halves of the plug were held together with uranium washers and screws which fit smoothly into the domed ends of the plug.

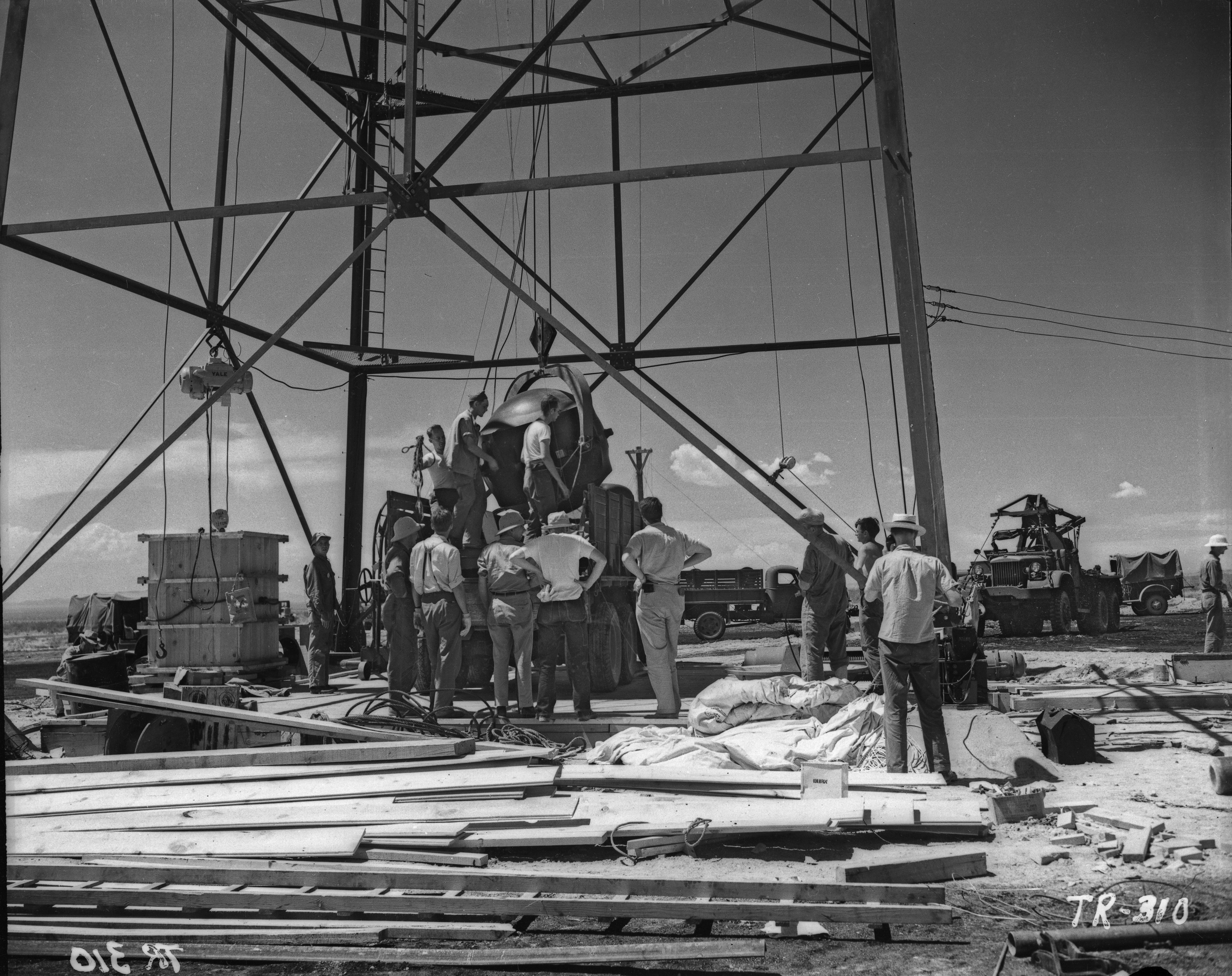
The bomb being unloaded at the base of the tower for the final assembly

To better understand the likely effect of a bomb dropped from a plane and detonated in air, and generate less nuclear fallout, the bomb was to be detonated atop a 100-foot (30 m) steel tower. The bomb was driven to the base of the tower, where a temporary eye bolt was screwed into the 105-pound (48 kg) capsule and a chain hoist was used to lower the capsule into the bomb. As the capsule entered the hole in the uranium tamper, it stuck. Robert Bacher realized that the heat from the plutonium core had caused the capsule to expand, while the explosives assembly with the tamper had cooled during the night in the desert. By leaving the capsule in contact with the tamper, the temperatures equalized and, in a few minutes, the capsule had slipped completely into the tamper. The eye bolt was then removed from the capsule and replaced with a threaded uranium plug, a boron disk was placed on top of the capsule (to complete the thin spherical shell of plastic boron around the tamper), an aluminum plug was screwed into the hole in the pusher (aluminum shell surrounding the tamper), and the two remaining high explosive lenses were installed. Finally, the upper Dural polar cap was bolted into place. The assembly of active material and high explosives was finished at 17:45 hours on 13 July.

The test tower's four legs rested on concrete footings extending 20 feet (6.1 m) into the ground; at its top, an oak platform formed the floor of a corrugated iron shack open to the west. The gadget was hauled up the tower with an electric winch. A truckload of mattresses was placed underneath in case the cable broke and the gadget fell. (Note: The mattresses would not have protected the gadget, but they helped the men to feel better.) A crew then attached each of the 32 Model 1773 EBW detonators. Full assembly of the bomb was completed by 17:00 on July 14. The seven-man arming party, consisting of Bainbridge, Kistiakowsky, Joseph McKibben and four soldiers including Lieutenant Bush, drove out to the tower to perform the final arming shortly after 22:00 on July 15.

=== Personnel ===
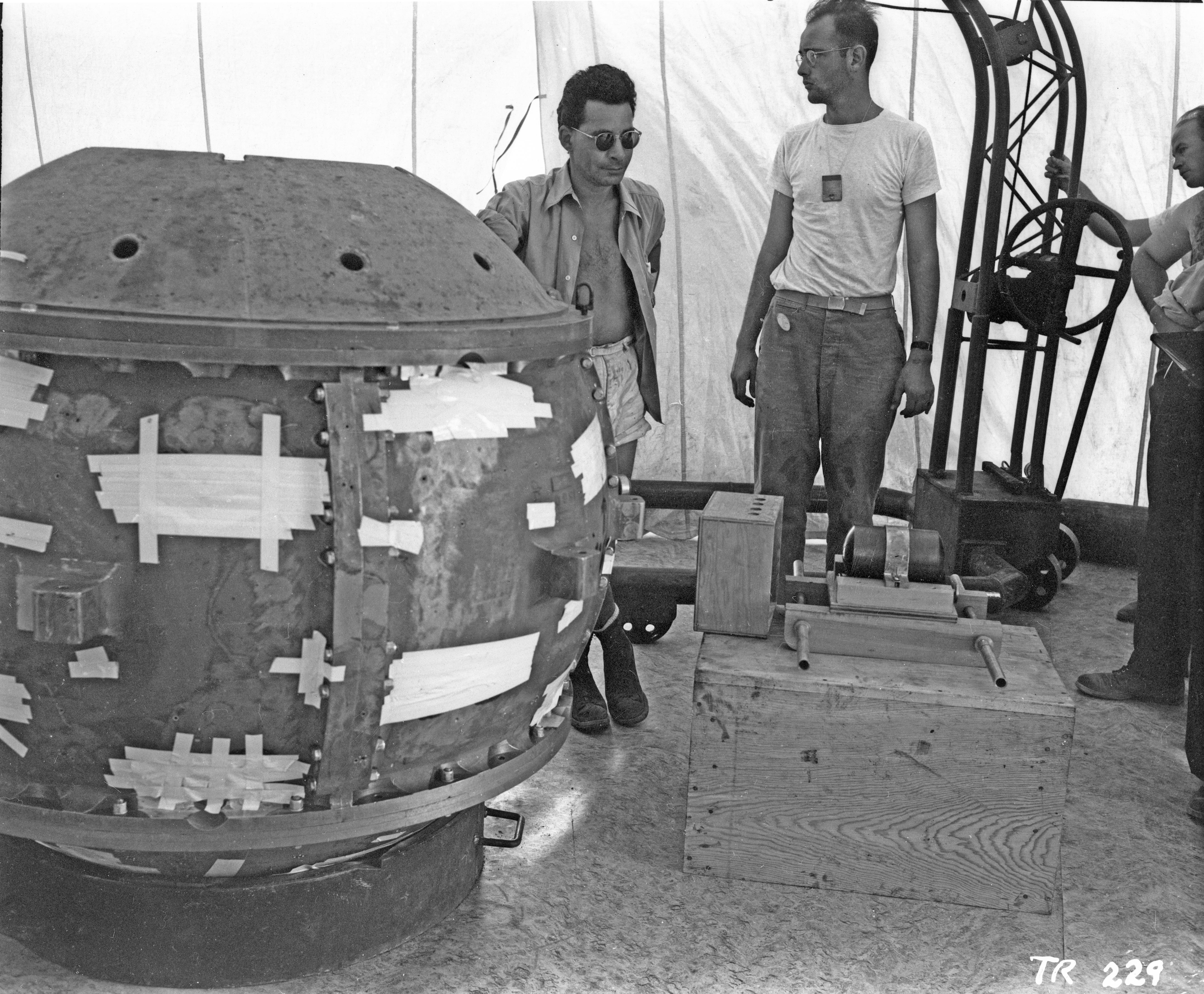
Louis Slotin and Herbert Lehr prior to insertion of the bomb's tamper plug (visible in front of Lehr's left knee)

In the final two weeks before the test, some 250 personnel from Los Alamos were at work at the Trinity Site, and Lieutenant Bush's command had ballooned to 125 men guarding and maintaining the base camp. Another 160 men under Major T. O. Palmer were stationed outside the area with vehicles to evacuate the civilian population in the surrounding region should that prove necessary. They had enough vehicles to move 450 people to safety and had food and supplies to last them for two days. Arrangements were made for Alamogordo Army Air Field to provide accommodation. Groves warned Governor of New Mexico John J. Dempsey that martial law might have to be declared in the southwestern part of the state.

Shelters were established 10,000 yards (9,100 m) due north, west, and south of the tower, each with its own chief: Robert Wilson at N-10,000, John Manley at W-10,000 and Frank Oppenheimer at S-10,000. Many other observers were around 20 miles (32 km) away, and some others were scattered at different distances, some in more informal situations. Richard Feynman claimed to be the only person to see the explosion without the goggles provided, relying on a truck windshield to screen out harmful ultraviolet wavelengths. Bainbridge asked Groves to keep his VIP list down to ten. He chose himself, Oppenheimer, Richard Tolman, Vannevar Bush, James Conant, Brigadier General Thomas F. Farrell, Charles Lauritsen, Isidor Isaac Rabi, Sir Geoffrey Taylor, and Sir James Chadwick. The VIPs viewed the test from Compania Hill (also called Compaña Hill or Cerro de la Colorado), about 20 miles (32 km) northwest of the tower.

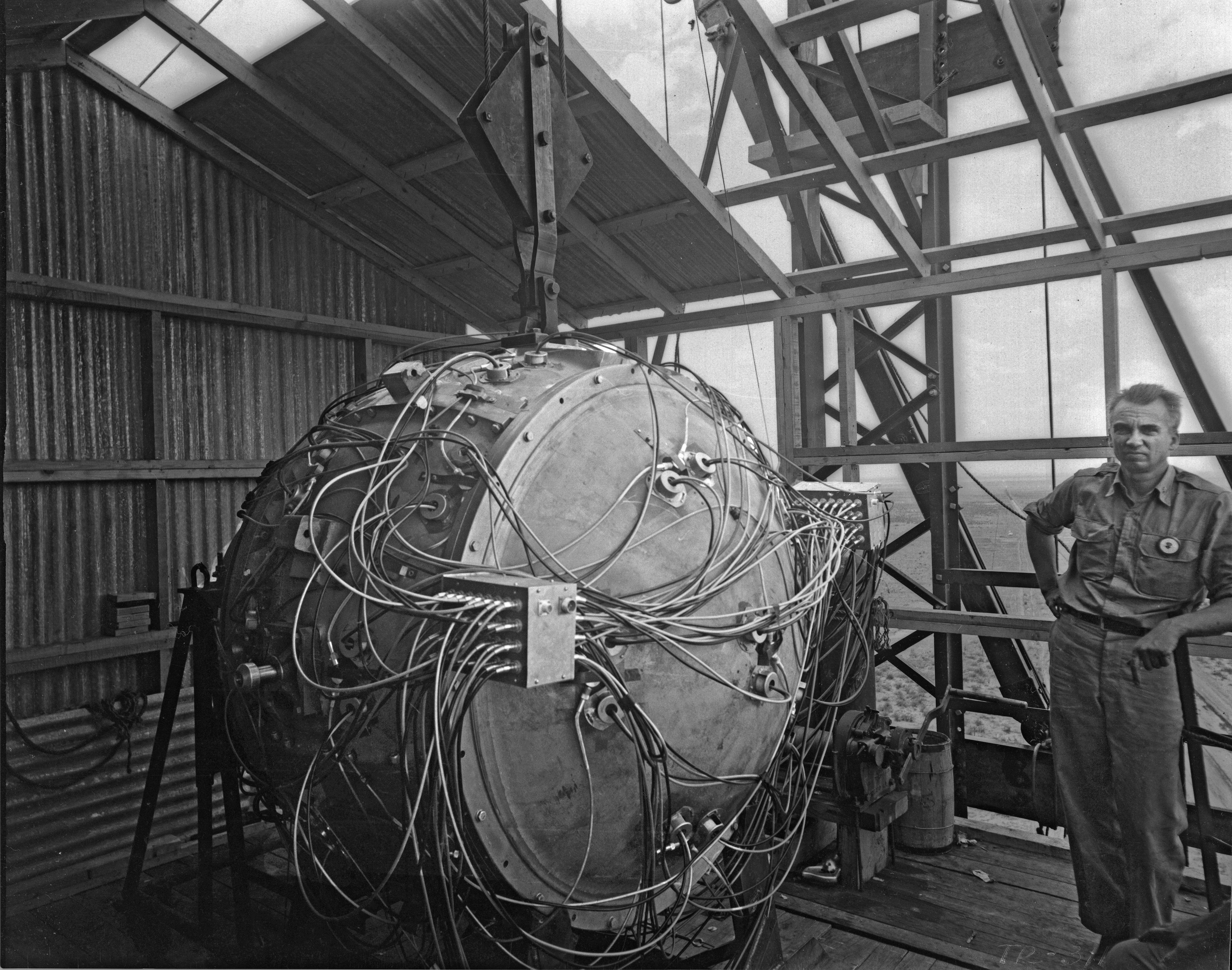
Norris Bradbury with the assembled bomb atop the test tower. He later succeeded Oppenheimer as director of Los Alamos.

Photographic film was placed in nearby towns to detect radioactive contamination, and seismographs were placed in Tucson, Denver, and Chihuahua, Mexico, to determine how far the explosion could be sensed. Calculations stated that even if the mechanical and electrical systems did not fail, the likelihood of a non-optimal test was greater than 10%. The observers set up a betting pool on the results of the test. Teller was the most optimistic, predicting 45 kilotons of TNT (190 TJ). He wore gloves to protect his hands and sunglasses underneath the welding goggles that the government had supplied everyone with. He was one of the few scientists to watch the test (with eye protection), instead of following orders to lie on the ground with his back turned. He also brought suntan lotion, which he shared with the others. Ramsey chose zero (a complete dud), Robert Oppenheimer chose 0.3 kilotons of TNT (1.3 TJ), Kistiakowsky 1.4 kilotons of TNT (5.9 TJ), and Bethe chose 8 kilotons of TNT (33 TJ). Rabi, the last to arrive, took the only remaining choice – 18 kilotons of TNT (75 TJ), which turned out to be the winner. Bethe later stated that his choice of 8 kt was exactly the value calculated by Segrè, and he was swayed by Segrè's authority over that of a more junior [but unnamed] member of Segrè's group who had calculated 20 kt.

Enrico Fermi offered to take wagers among the top physicists and military present on whether the atmosphere would ignite, and if so whether it would destroy just the state or incinerate the entire planet. This last result had been previously calculated by Bethe to be almost impossible, (Note: The reaction Teller was most concerned with was: ^{14}_{7}N + ^{14}_{7}N → ^{24}_{12}Mg + ^{4}_{2}He (alpha particle) + 17.7 MeV.) although for a while it had caused some of the scientists some anxiety. Bainbridge was furious with Fermi for frightening the guards, some of whom asked to be relieved; his own biggest fear was that nothing at all would happen, in which case he would have to return to the tower to investigate.

== Explosion ==
=== Detonation ===
Trinity detonation

The scientists wanted good visibility, low humidity, light winds at low altitude, and westerly winds at high altitude for the test. The best weather was predicted between July 18 and 21, but the Potsdam Conference was due to start on July 16 and President Harry S. Truman wanted the test to be conducted before the conference began. It was therefore scheduled for July 16, the earliest date at which the bomb components would be available.

The detonation was initially planned for 04:00 MWT but was postponed because of rain and lightning from early that morning. It was feared that the danger from radiation and fallout would be increased by rain, and lightning had the scientists concerned about a premature detonation, as had happened with a model of the electrical system. A crucial favorable weather report came in at 04:45, and the final twenty-minute countdown began at 05:10, read by Samuel Allison. A rocket launched at 5:25 to signal five minutes before detonation; another rocket fired at 5:29. At 5:29:15, a switch in the control bunker started the detonation timer. By 05:30 the rain had gone. There were some communication problems: the shortwave radio frequency for communicating with the B-29s was shared with the Voice of America, and the FM radios shared a frequency with a railroad freight yard in San Antonio, Texas.

Two circling B-29s observed the test, with Shields again flying the lead plane. They carried members of Project Alberta who would carry out airborne measurements during the atomic bombing missions over Japan. These included Captain Deak Parsons, the associate director of the Los Alamos Laboratory and the head of Project Alberta; Luis Alvarez, Harold Agnew, Bernard Waldman, Wolfgang Panofsky, and William Penney. The overcast sky obscured their view of the test site.

At 05:29:21 MWT (11:29:21 GMT) ± 15 seconds, the device exploded with an energy equivalent to 24.8 ± 2 kilotons of TNT (103.8 ± 8.4 TJ). The desert sand, largely made of silica, melted and became a mildly radioactive light green glass, which was named trinitite. The explosion created a crater approximately 4.7 feet (1.4 m) deep and 88 yards (80 m) wide. The radius of the trinitite layer was approximately 330 yards (300 m). The 100-foot tower was completely vaporized. At the time of detonation, the surrounding mountains were illuminated "brighter than daytime" for one to two seconds, and the heat was reported as "being as hot as an oven" at the base camp. The observed colors of the illumination changed from purple to green and eventually to white. The roar of the shock wave took 40 seconds to reach the observers. It was felt over 100 miles (160 km) away, and the mushroom cloud reached 7.5 miles (12.1 km) in height.

Many observers recalled their amazement at the light from the explosion. Conant wrote, "The enormity of the light and its length quite stunned me". Lawrence, 27 miles (43 km) away, wrote of being "enveloped with a warm brilliant yellow white light—from darkness to brilliant sunshine in an instant". Ralph Carlisle Smith, watching from Compania Hill, wrote:

I was staring straight ahead with my open left eye covered by a welder's glass and my right eye remaining open and uncovered. Suddenly, my right eye was blinded by a light which appeared instantaneously all about without any build up of intensity. My left eye could see the ball of fire start up like a tremendous bubble or nob-like mushroom. I dropped the glass from my left eye almost immediately and watched the light climb upward. The light intensity fell rapidly, hence did not blind my left eye but it was still amazingly bright. It turned yellow, then red, and then beautiful purple. At first it had a translucent character, but shortly turned to a tinted or colored white smoke appearance. The ball of fire seemed to rise in something of toadstool effect. Later the column proceeded as a cylinder of white smoke; it seemed to move ponderously. A hole was punched through the clouds, but two fog rings appeared well above the white smoke column. There was a spontaneous cheer from the observers. Dr. von Neumann said, "that was at least 5,000 tons and probably a lot more."

The only female staff member officially invited to watch the test was Mary Argo, but Joan Hinton snuck in; as Hinton recalled:

It was like being at the bottom of an ocean of light. We were bathed in it from all directions. The light withdrew into the bomb as if the bomb sucked it up. Then it turned purple and blue and went up and up and up. We were still talking in whispers when the cloud reached the level where it was struck by the rising sunlight so it cleared out the natural clouds. We saw a cloud that was dark and red at the bottom and daylight on the top. Then suddenly the sound reached us. It was very sharp and rumbled and all the mountains were rumbling with it.

In his official report on the test, Thomas Farrell (who initially exclaimed, "The long-hairs have let it get away from them!") wrote:

The lighting effects beggared description. The whole country was lighted by a searing light with the intensity many times that of the midday sun. It was golden, purple, violet, gray, and blue. It lighted every peak, crevasse and ridge of the nearby mountain range with a clarity and beauty that cannot be described but must be seen to be imagined ...

William L. Laurence of The New York Times had been transferred temporarily to the Manhattan Project at Groves's request in early 1945. Groves had arranged for Laurence to view significant events, including Trinity and the atomic bombing of Japan. Laurence wrote press releases with the help of the Manhattan Project's public relations staff. He later recalled:

A loud cry filled the air. The little groups that hitherto had stood rooted to the earth like desert plants broke into dance, the rhythm of primitive man dancing at one of his fire festivals at the coming of Spring.

After the initial euphoria of witnessing the explosion had passed, Bainbridge told Oppenheimer, "Now we are all sons of bitches." Rabi noticed Oppenheimer's reaction: "I'll never forget his walk"; Rabi recalled, "I'll never forget the way he stepped out of the car ... his walk was like High Noon ... this kind of strut. He had done it." (Note: Rabi's comparison would have been made in retrospect, as High Noon was released in 1952.)

Oppenheimer later recalled that, while witnessing the explosion, he thought of a verse from a Hindu holy book, the Bhagavad Gita (XI,12):

दिवि सूर्यसहस्रस्य भवेद्युगपदुत्थिता।
यदि भाः सदृशी सा स्याद्भासस्तस्य महात्मनः।।

Translation:

If the radiance of a thousand suns were to burst at once into the sky,
that would be like the splendor of the mighty one.

Years later he would explain that another verse had also entered his head at that time:

We knew the world would not be the same. A few people laughed, a few people cried. Most people were silent. I remembered the line from the Hindu scripture, the Bhagavad Gita; Vishnu is trying to persuade the Prince that he should do his duty and, to impress him, takes on his multi-armed form and says, 'Now I am become Death, the destroyer of worlds.' I suppose we all thought that, one way or another. (Note: Oppenheimer spoke these words in the television documentary The Decision to Drop the Bomb (1965). Oppenheimer read the original text in Sanskrit, "kālo'smi lokakṣayakṛtpravṛddho lokānsamāhartumiha pravṛttaḥ" (XI,32), which he translated as "I am become Death, the destroyer of worlds". In the literature, the quote usually appears in the form shatterer of worlds, because this was the form in which it first appeared in print, in Time magazine on November 8, 1948. It later appeared in Robert Jungk's Brighter than a Thousand Suns: A Personal History of the Atomic Scientists (1958), which was based on an interview with Oppenheimer. See Hijiya, The Gita of Robert Oppenheimer)

John R. Lugo was flying a U.S. Navy transport at 10,000 feet (3,000 m), 30 miles (48 km) east of Albuquerque, en route to the west coast. "My first impression was, like, the sun was coming up in the south. What a ball of fire! It was so bright it lit up the cockpit of the plane." Lugo radioed Albuquerque. He got no explanation for the blast but was told, "Don't fly south."

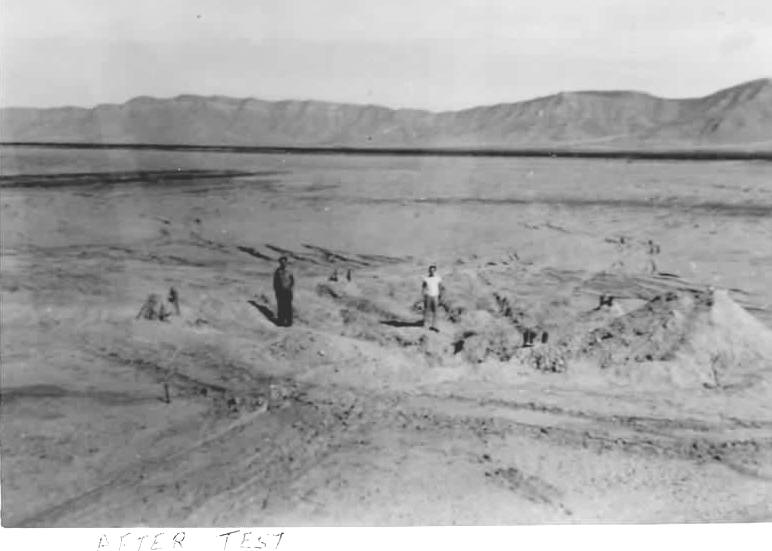
Ground zero after the test

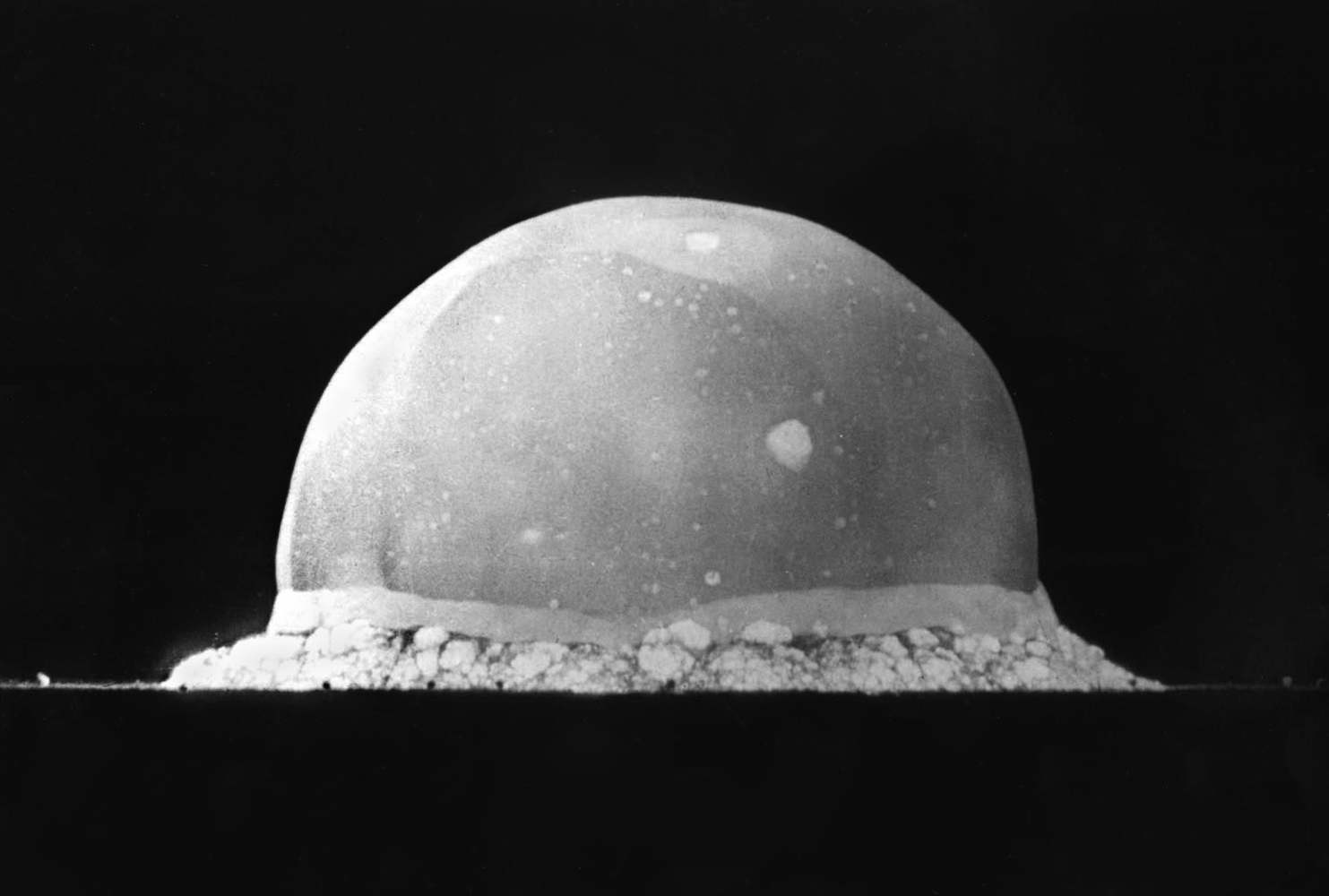
The Trinity explosion, 16 ms after detonation. The fireball hemisphere's highest point in this image is about 200 meters high.

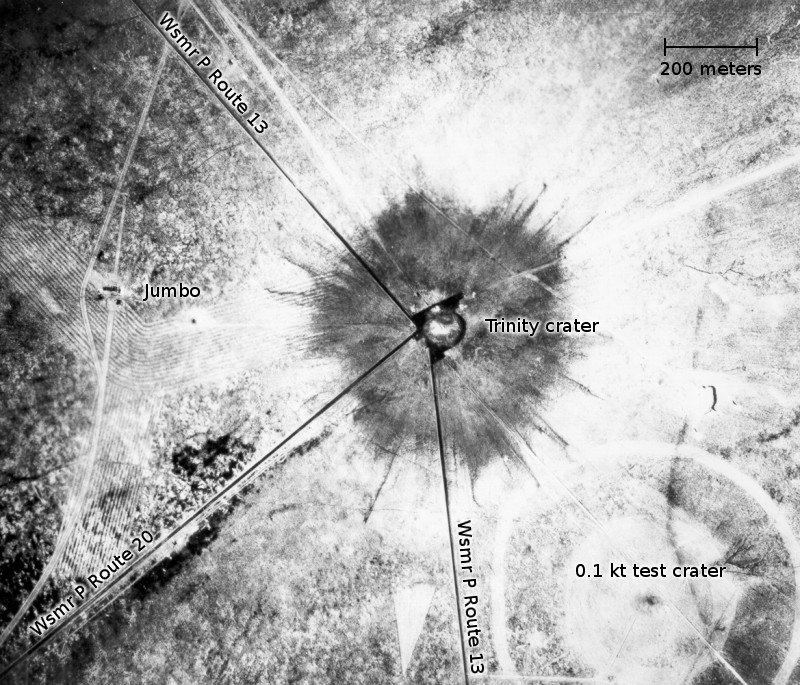
An aerial photograph of the Trinity crater shortly after the test (Note: The small crater in the southeast corner was from the earlier test explosion of 108 tons of TNT (450 GJ).)

=== Instrumentation and measurements ===
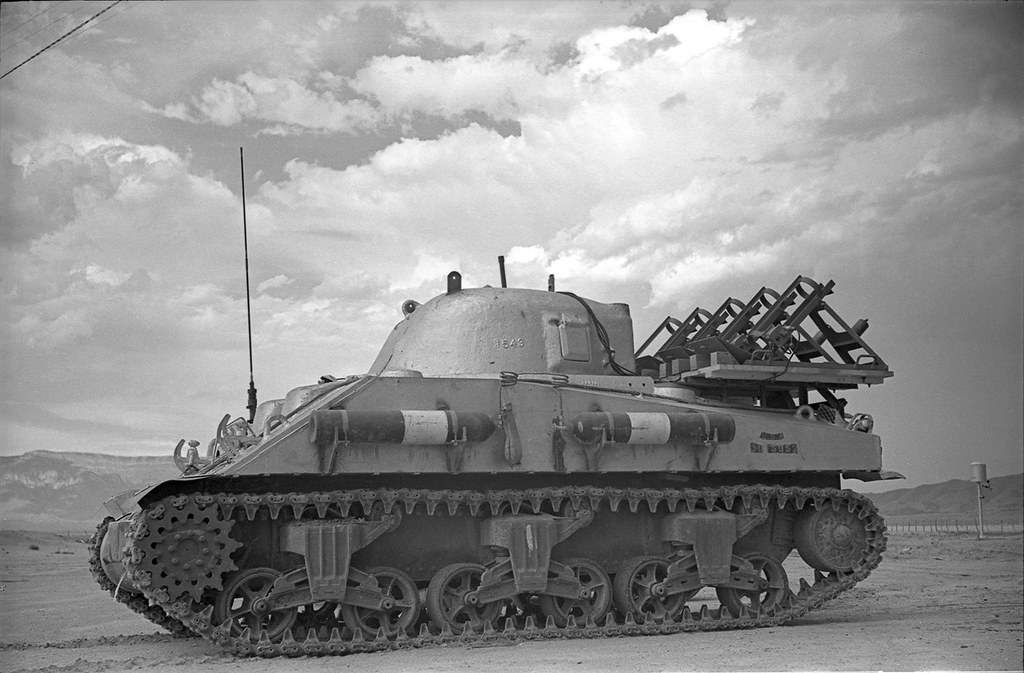
Lead-lined Sherman tank used in the Trinity test

The T (Theoretical) Division at Los Alamos had predicted a yield of between 5 and 10 kilotons of TNT (21 and 42 TJ). Immediately after the blast, two lead-lined M4 Sherman tanks made their way to the crater. Radiochemical analysis of soil samples that they collected indicated that the total yield (or energy release) had been around 18.6 kilotons of TNT (78 TJ). This method turned out to be the most accurate means of determining the efficiency of a nuclear explosion and was used for many years after.

The energy of the blast wave was measured by a large number of sensors using a variety of physical principles. The piezoelectric blast gauges were thrown off scale and no records were obtained. The excess-velocity blast-yield measurement (precise measurement of the velocity of sound at the site of the explosion and then comparing it with the velocity of the blast wave) provided among the most accurate measurements of the blast pressure. Another method was to use the aluminum diaphragm box gauges designed to record the peak pressure of the blast wave. These indicated a blast energy of 9.9 kilotons of TNT (41 TJ) ± 1.0 kiloton of TNT (4.2 TJ). They were supplemented by a large number of other types of mechanical pressure gauges. And only one of them gave a reasonable result of about 10 kilotons of TNT (42 TJ).

Fermi conducted his own experiment to measure the energy that was released as blast. He later recalled:

About 40 seconds after the explosion the air blast reached me. I tried to estimate its strength by dropping from about six feet small pieces of paper before, during, and after the passage of the blast wave. Since, at the time, there was no wind I could observe very distinctly and actually measure the displacement of the pieces of paper that were in the process of falling while the blast was passing. The shift was about 2 1/2 meters, which, at the time, I estimated to correspond to the blast that would be produced by ten thousand tons of T.N.T.

Fission bomb's energy distribution in the "moderate" kiloton range near sea level
Contemporary fundamental physics, data from the Trinity test, and others, resulted in the following total blast and thermal energy fractionation being observed for fission detonations near sea level
Blast	50%
Thermal energy	35%
Initial ionizing radiation	5%
Residual fallout radiation	10%

There were also several gamma ray and neutron detectors; few survived the blast, with all the gauges within 200 feet (61 m) of ground zero being destroyed, but sufficient data were recovered to measure the gamma ray component of the ionizing radiation released.

Some fifty different cameras had been set up, taking motion and still photographs. Special Fastax cameras taking 10,000 frames per second would record the minute details of the explosion. Spectrograph cameras would record the wavelengths of light emitted by the explosion, and pinhole cameras would record gamma rays. A rotating drum spectrograph at the 10,000-yard (9,100 m) station would obtain the spectrum over the first hundredth of a second. Another, slow recording one would track the fireball. Cameras were placed in bunkers only 800 yards (730 m) from the tower, protected by steel and lead glass, and mounted on sleds so they could be towed out by the lead-lined tank. Some observers brought their own cameras despite the security. Segrè brought in Jack Aeby with his 35 mm Perfex 44. He took the only well-exposed color photograph of the detonation explosion.

The official estimate for the total yield of the Trinity bomb, which includes the energy of the blast component together with the contributions from the explosion's light output and both forms of ionizing radiation, is 21 kilotons of TNT (88 TJ), of which about 15 kilotons of TNT (63 TJ) was contributed by fission of the plutonium core, and about 6 kilotons of TNT (25 TJ) was from fission of the natural uranium tamper. A re-analysis of data published in 2021 put the yield at 24.8 ± 2 kilotons of TNT (103.8 ± 8.4 TJ).

As a result of the data gathered on the size of the blast, the detonation height for the bombing of Hiroshima was set at 1,885 feet (575 m) to take advantage of the Mach stem blast reinforcing effect. The final Nagasaki burst height was 1,650 feet (500 m) so the Mach stem started sooner. The knowledge that implosion worked led Oppenheimer to recommend to Groves that the uranium-235 used in a Little Boy gun-type weapon could be used more economically in a Fat Man implosion-type weapon containing a composite core with plutonium and enriched uranium. It was too late to do this with the first Little Boy, but the composite cores would soon enter production.

=== Civilian detection ===
The light from the test was visible as far as Amarillo, Texas, 280 miles (450 km) and a mountain range away from Trinity. The Second Air Force issued a press release with a cover story that Groves had prepared weeks before, which described the explosion as the accidental destruction of a magazine on the base. The press release, written by Laurence, stated:

Alamogordo, N.M., July 16 The commanding officer of the Alamogordo Army Air Base made the following statement today: "Several inquiries have been received concerning a heavy explosion which occurred on the Alamogordo Air base reservation this morning. A remotely located ammunition magazine containing a considerable amount of high explosives and pyrotechnics exploded. There was no loss of life or injury to anyone, and the property damage outside of the explosives magazine was negligible. Weather conditions affecting the content of gas shells exploded by the blast may make it desirable for the Army to evacuate temporarily a few civilians from their homes."

Laurence had prepared four releases, covering outcomes ranging from a cover story for a successful test (the one which was used) to catastrophic scenarios involving serious damage to surrounding communities, evacuation of nearby residents, and a placeholder for the names of those killed. As Laurence was a witness to the test, he knew that the last release, if used, might be his own obituary. A newspaper article published the same day stated that "the blast was seen and felt throughout an area extending from El Paso to Silver City, Gallup, Socorro, and Albuquerque." The articles appeared in New Mexico, but East Coast newspapers ignored them, and local residents who saw the light accepted the cover story.

Information about the Trinity test was made public shortly after the bombing of Hiroshima. The Smyth Report, released on August 12, 1945, gave some information on the blast, and the edition released by Princeton University Press a few weeks later incorporated the War Department's press release on the test as Appendix 6, and contained the famous pictures of a "bulbous" Trinity fireball.

=== Official notifications ===
The results of the test were conveyed to Secretary of War Henry L. Stimson at the Potsdam Conference in Germany in a coded message from his assistant George L. Harrison:

Operated on this morning. Diagnosis not yet complete but results seem satisfactory and already exceed expectations. Local press release necessary as interest extends great distance. Dr. Groves pleased. He returns tomorrow. I will keep you posted.

The message arrived at the "Little White House" in the Potsdam suburb of Babelsberg and was at once taken to Truman and Secretary of State James F. Byrnes. Harrison sent a follow-up message which arrived on the morning of July 18:

Doctor has just returned most enthusiastic and confident that the little boy is as husky as his big brother. The light in his eyes discernible from here to Highhold and I could have heard his screams from here to my farm.

Because Stimson's summer home at Highhold was on Long Island and Harrison's farm near Upperville, Virginia, this indicated that the explosion could be seen 250 miles (400 km) away and heard 50 miles (80 km) away.

Three days later, on July 21, a 13-page report written by Groves arrived at Potsdam via a courier. It stated:

At 0530, 16 July 1945, in a remote section of the Alamogordo Air Base, New Mexico, the first full scale test was made of the implosion type atomic fission bomb. For the first time in history there was a nuclear explosion. And what an explosion! ... The test was successful beyond the most optimistic expectations of anyone.

=== Fallout ===
Film badges used to measure exposure to radioactivity indicated that no observers at N-10,000 had been exposed to more than 0.1 roentgens (half of the National Council on Radiation Protection and Measurements recommended daily radiation exposure limit), but the shelter was evacuated before the radioactive cloud could reach it. The explosion was more efficient than expected, and the thermal updraft drew most of the cloud high enough that little fallout fell on the test site. Nevertheless, the fission consumed only 1.4 kilograms (3 lb) out of the 5.9 kilograms (13 lb) of plutonium, leaving 4.5 kilograms (10 lb) to be spread through the atmosphere and as fallout. The crater was far more radioactive than expected due to the formation of trinitite, and the crews of the two lead-lined Sherman tanks were subjected to considerable exposure. Anderson's dosimeter and film badge recorded 7 to 10 roentgens, and one of the tank drivers, who made three trips, recorded 13 to 15 roentgens.

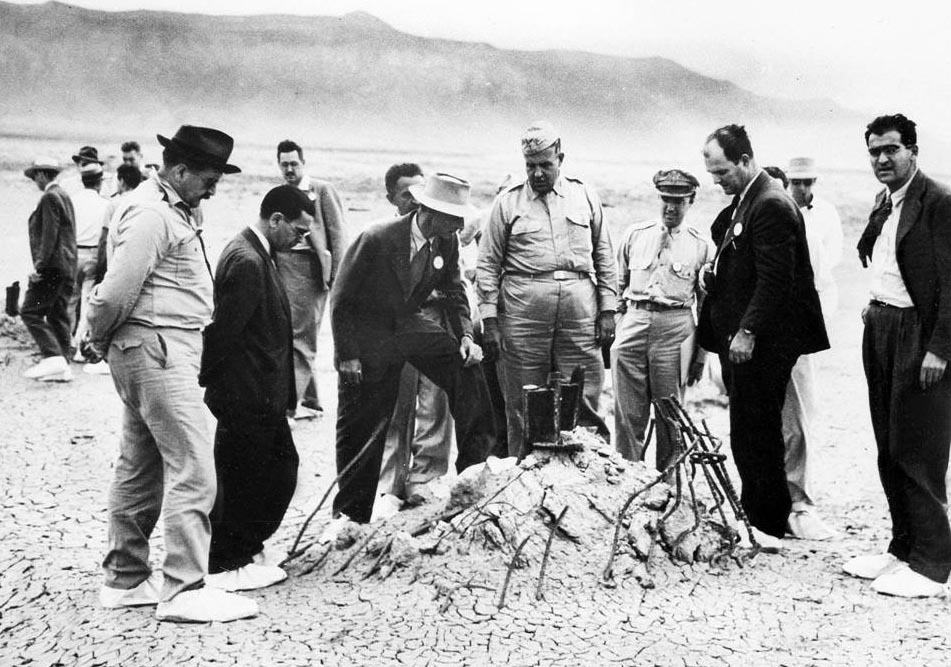
Groves and Oppenheimer at the remains of one leg of the test tower. Canvas overshoes kept trinitite off shoes.

The heaviest fallout contamination outside the restricted test area was 30 miles (48 km) from the detonation point, on Chupadera Mesa. The fallout there was reported to have settled in a white mist onto some of the livestock in the area, resulting in local beta burns and a temporary loss of dorsal or back hair. Patches of hair grew back discolored white. The Army bought 88 cattle in all from ranchers; the 17 most significantly marked were kept at Los Alamos, while the rest were shipped to Oak Ridge for long-term observation.

Dose reconstruction published in 2020 under the auspices of the National Cancer Institute documented that five counties in New Mexico experienced the greatest radioactive contamination: Guadalupe, Lincoln, San Miguel, Socorro, and Torrance. People living in the surrounding area near the site were unaware of the project and later not included in the 1990 Radiation Exposure Compensation Act support for affected "downwinders" which addressed serious community health problems resulting from similar tests conducted at the Nevada Test Site. Efforts in Congress to add the New Mexico residents to the population covered by the bill continued in 2024.

In August 1945, shortly after the bombing of Hiroshima, the Kodak Company observed spotting and fogging on its film, which was at that time usually packaged in cardboard containers. J. H. Webb, an employee of the Kodak Company, studied the matter and concluded that the contamination must have come from a nuclear explosion somewhere in the United States. He discounted the possibility that the Hiroshima bomb was responsible because of the timing of the events. A hot spot of fallout contaminated the river water that a paper mill in Indiana used to manufacture the cardboard pulp from corn husks. Aware of the gravity of his discovery, Webb kept this secret until 1949.

This incident, along with the next continental US tests in 1951, set a precedent. In subsequent atmospheric nuclear tests at the Nevada Test Site, United States Atomic Energy Commission officials gave the photographic industry maps and forecasts of potential contamination, as well as expected fallout distributions, which enabled them to purchase uncontaminated materials and take other protective measures.

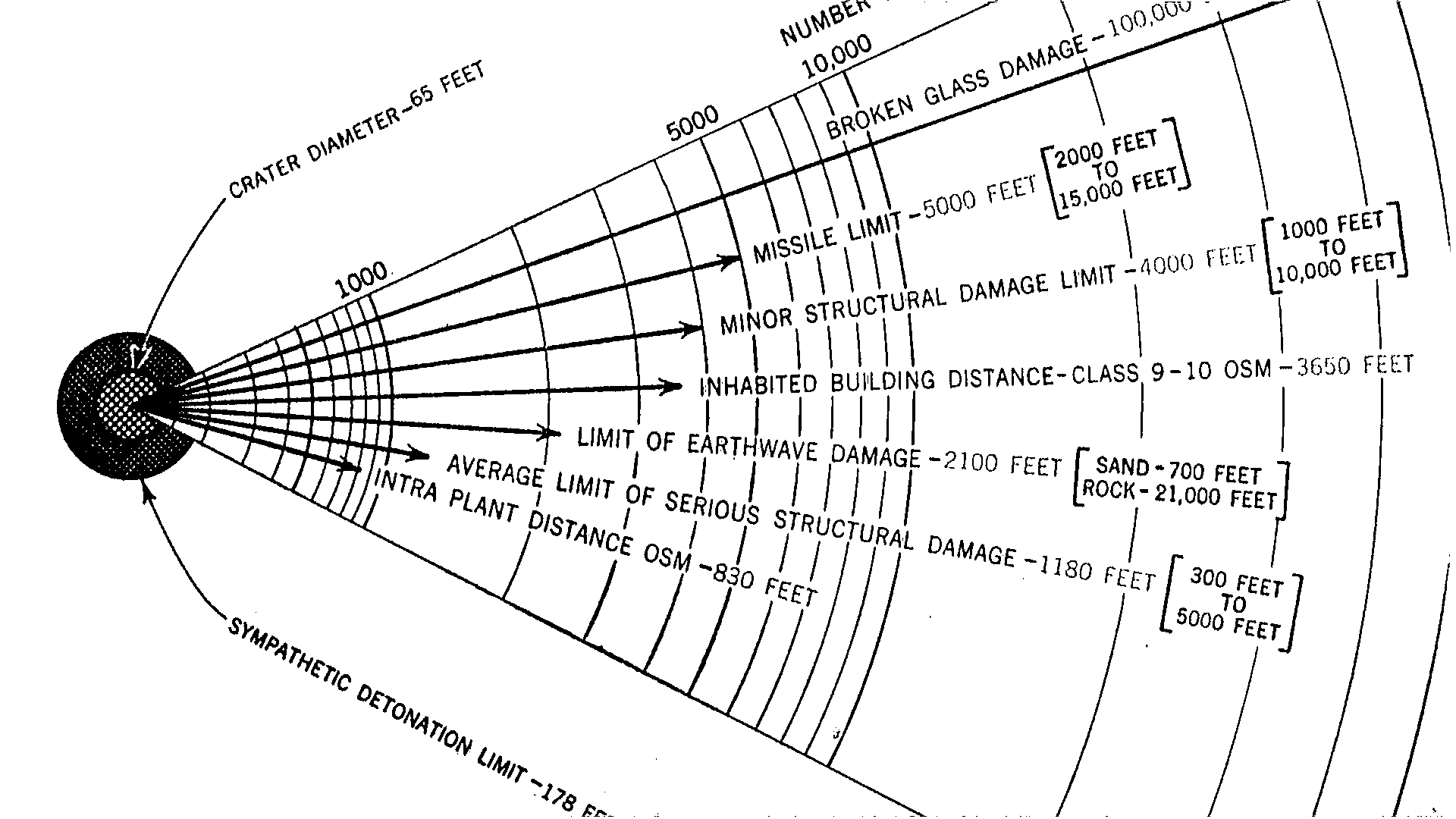
Post-Trinity detonation bomb damage assessment and effects evaluation

== Site today ==
"Trinity Site"
by National Atomic Museum
Read by James Christopher for LibriVox
Audio 00:24:52 (full text)

In September 1953, about 650 people attended the first Trinity Site open house. Visitors to a Trinity Site open house are allowed to see the ground zero and McDonald Ranch House areas. More than 80 years after the test, residual radiation at the site was about ten times higher than normal background radiation in the area. The amount of radioactive exposure received during a one-hour visit to the site is about half of the total radiation exposure which a U.S. adult receives on an average day from natural and medical sources.

On December 21, 1965, the 51,500-acre (20,800 ha) Trinity Site was declared a National Historic Landmark district, and on October 15, 1966, it was listed on the National Register of Historic Places. The landmark includes the base camp where the scientists and support group lived, ground zero where the bomb was placed for the explosion, and the McDonald ranch house, where the plutonium core to the bomb was assembled. One of the old instrumentation bunkers is visible beside the road just west of ground zero. An inner oblong fence was added in 1967, and the corridor barbed wire fence that connects the outer fence to the inner one was completed in 1972.

The Trinity monument, a rough-sided, lava-rock obelisk about 12 feet (3.7 m) high, marks the explosion's hypocenter. It was erected in 1965 by Army personnel using local rocks taken from the western boundary of the range. A special tour of the site on July 16, 1995 (marking the 50th anniversary of the Trinity test) attracted 5,000 visitors. For a time, the site was open to the public on the first Saturdays of April and October. As of (at least) 2026, the site is open once per year, on the third Saturday of October.

== Gallery ==
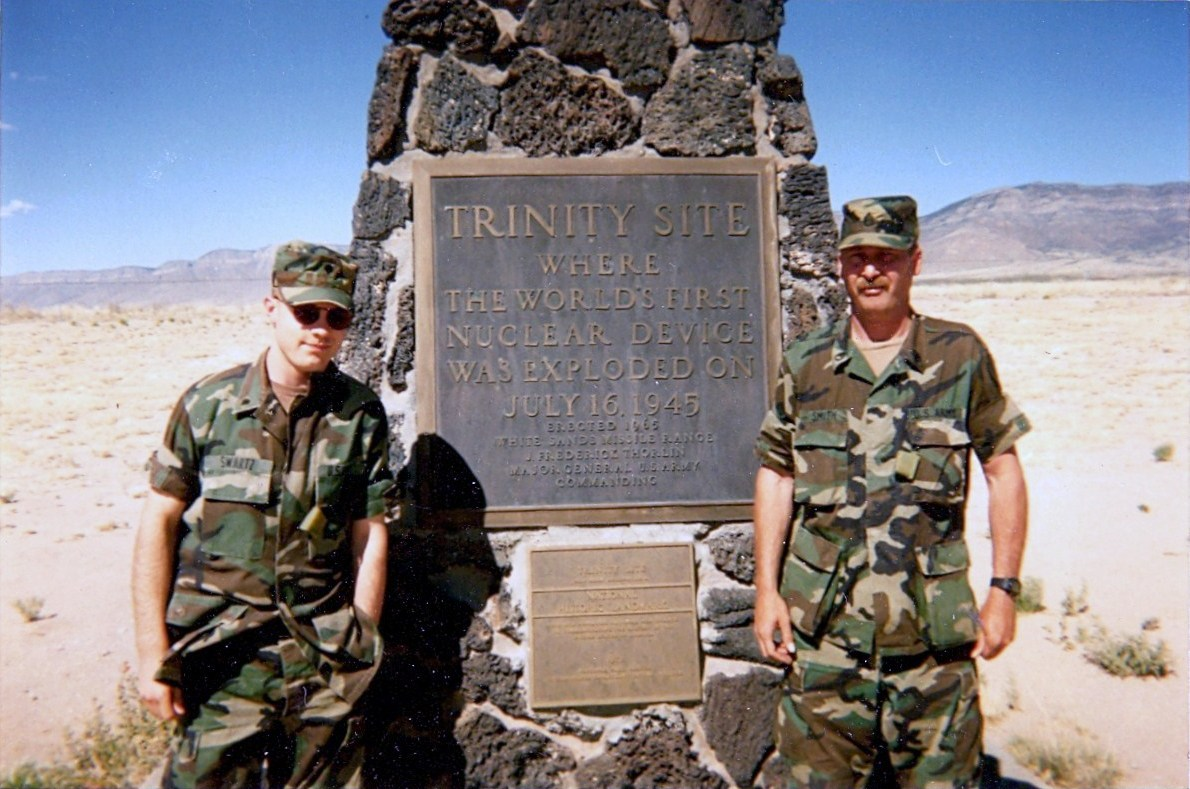
Visitors to the Trinity site in 1995 for the 50th anniversary

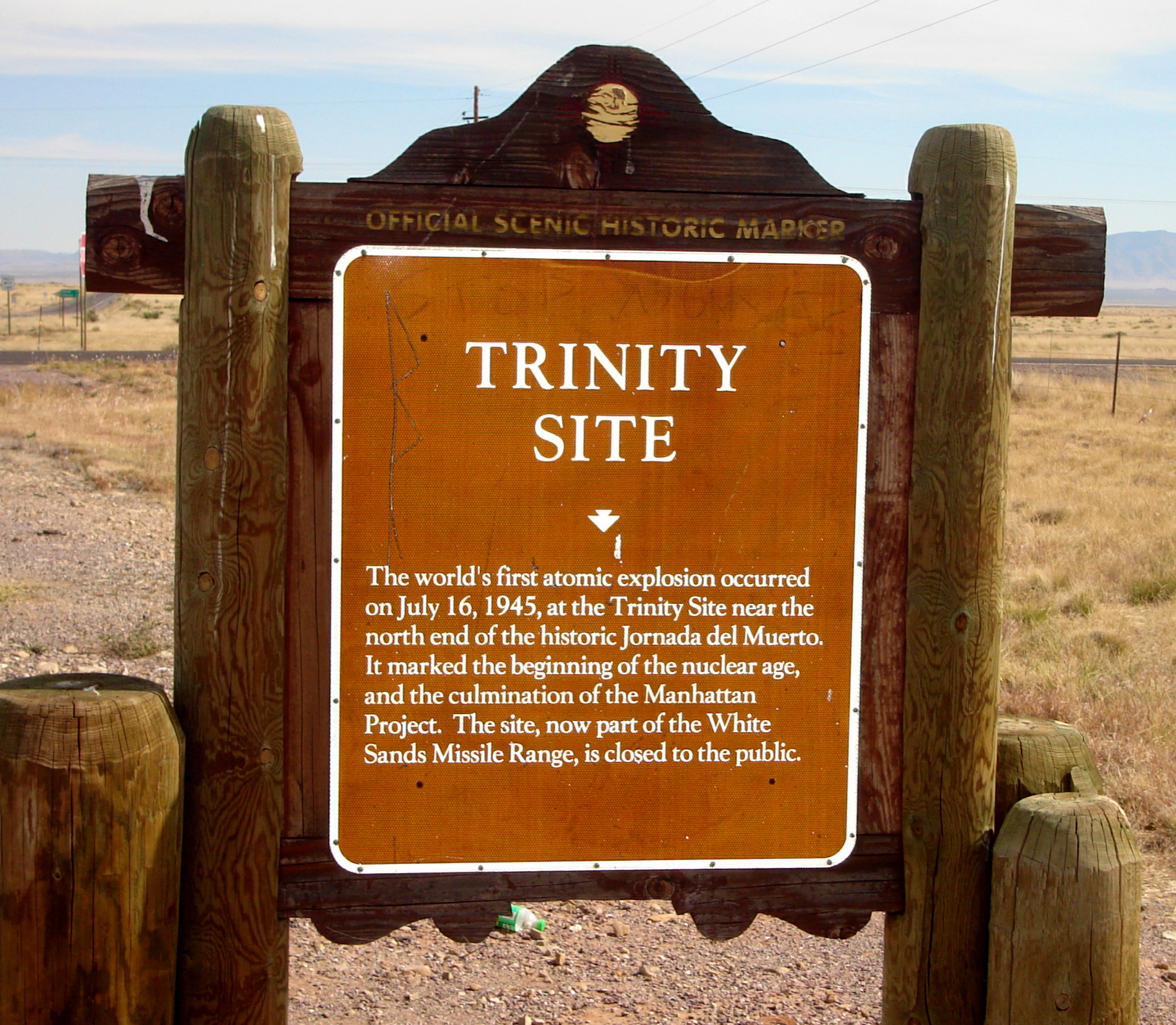
Trinity Site Historical Marker, 2008

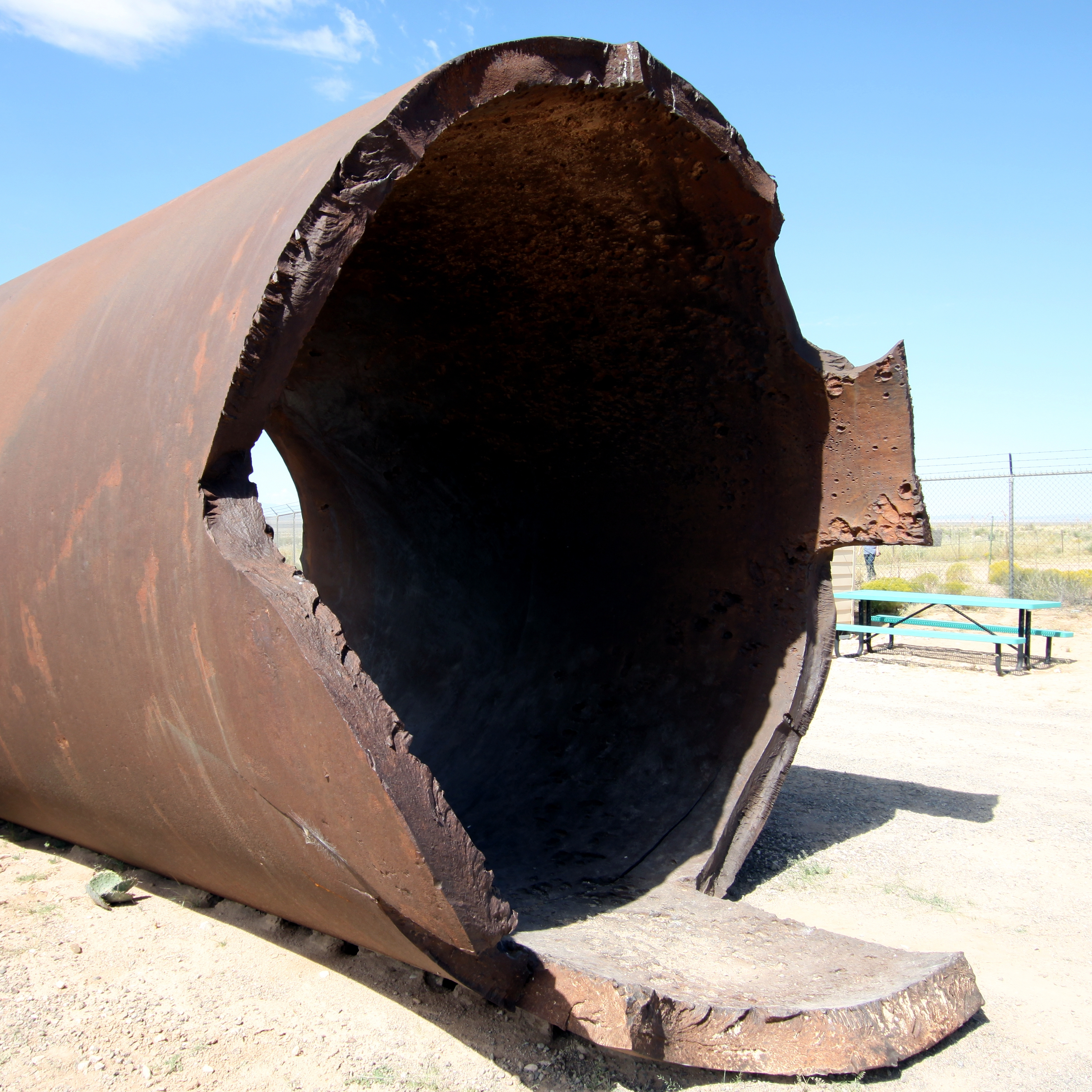
Remnants of Jumbo, 2010

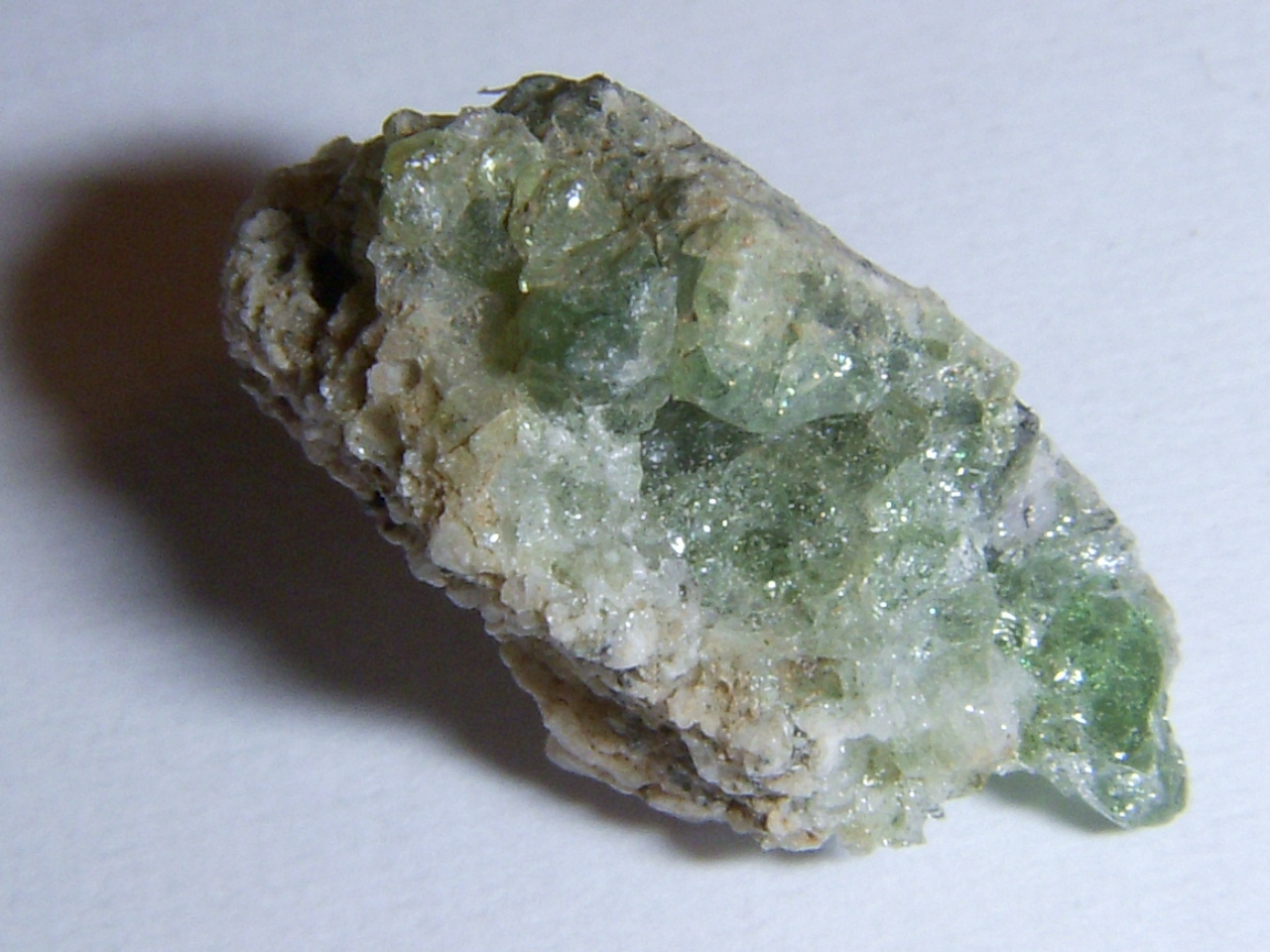
Trinitite

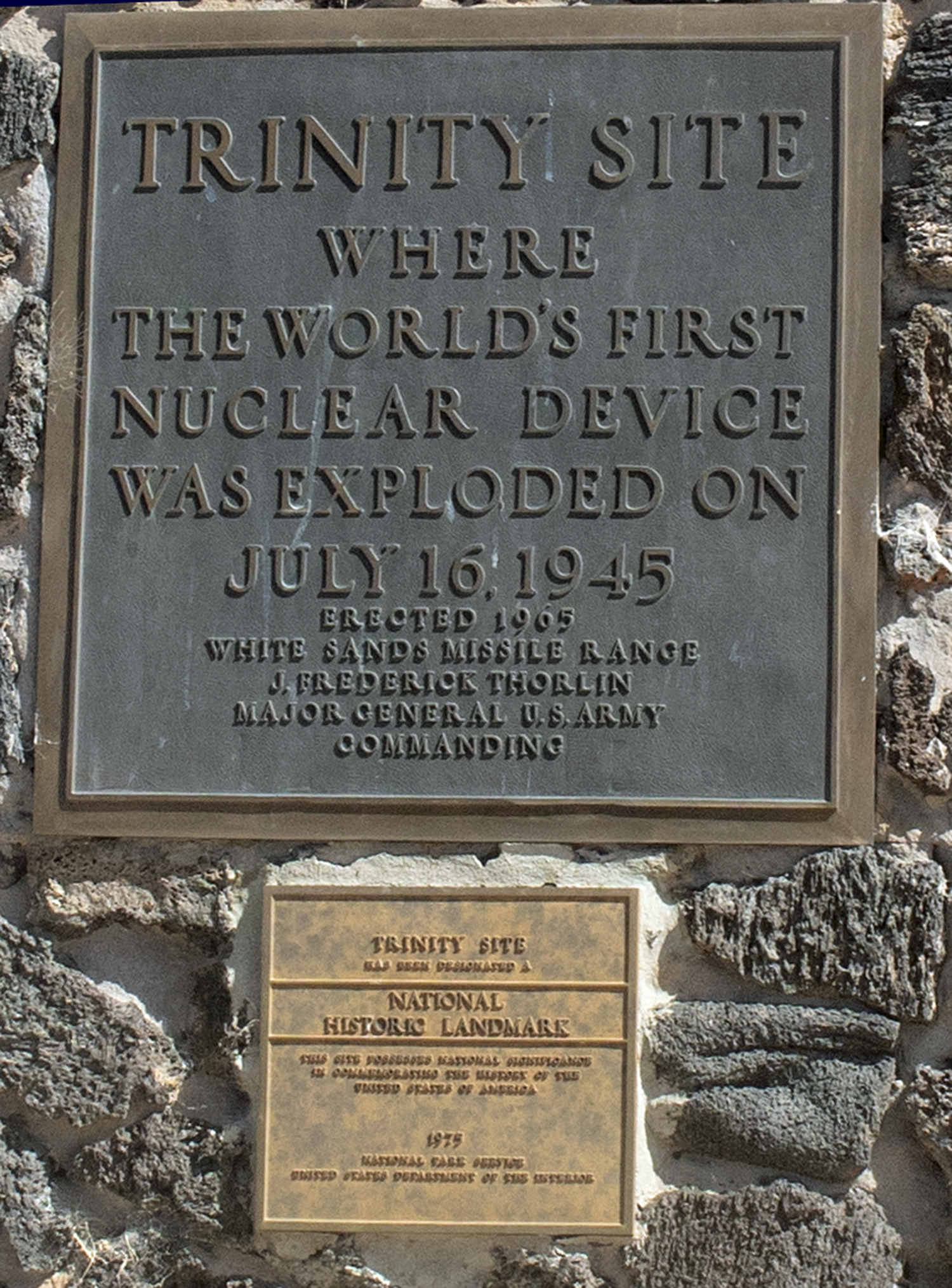
Closeup of plaque on obelisk, 2018

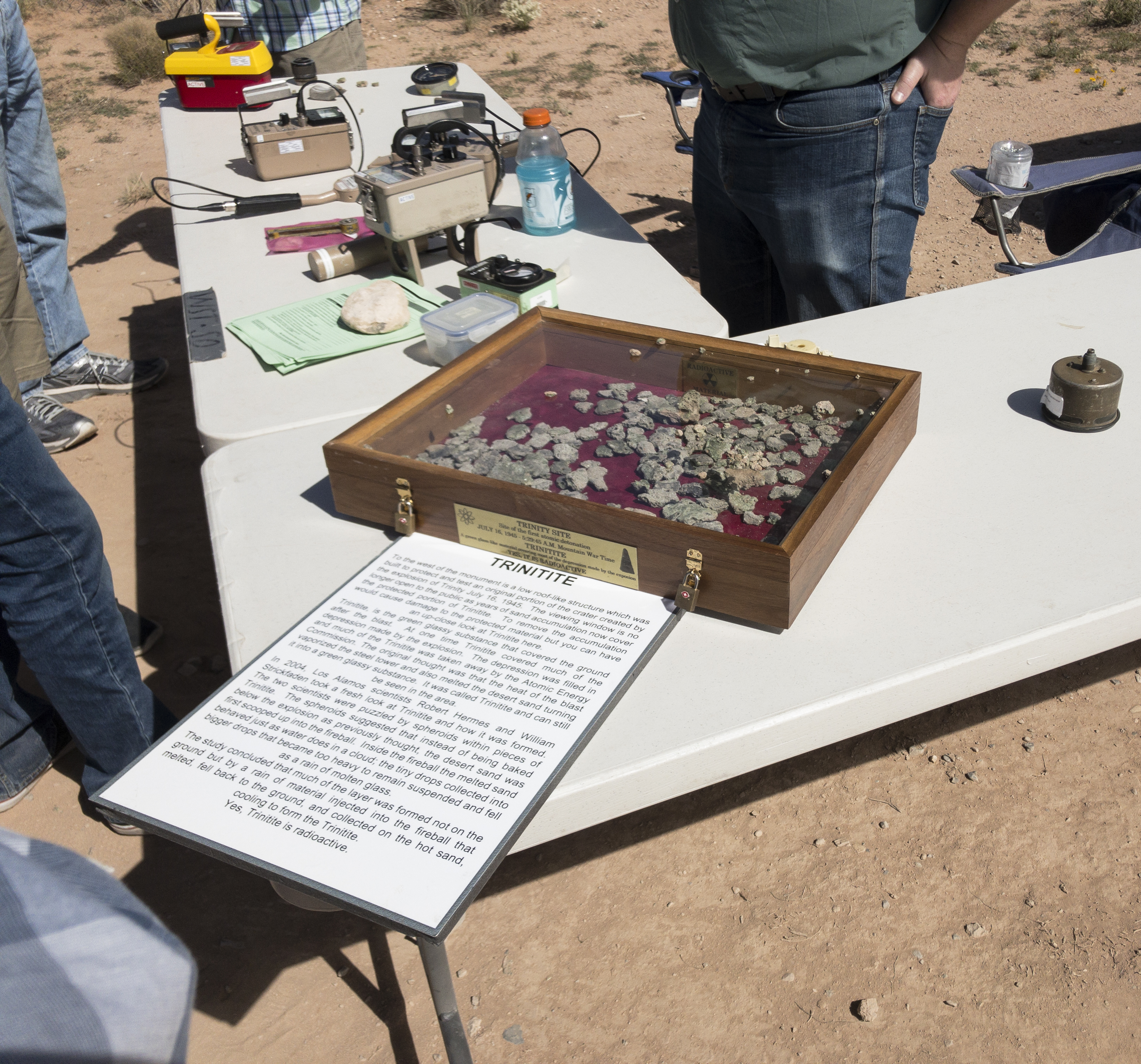
Trinitite display table, 2018

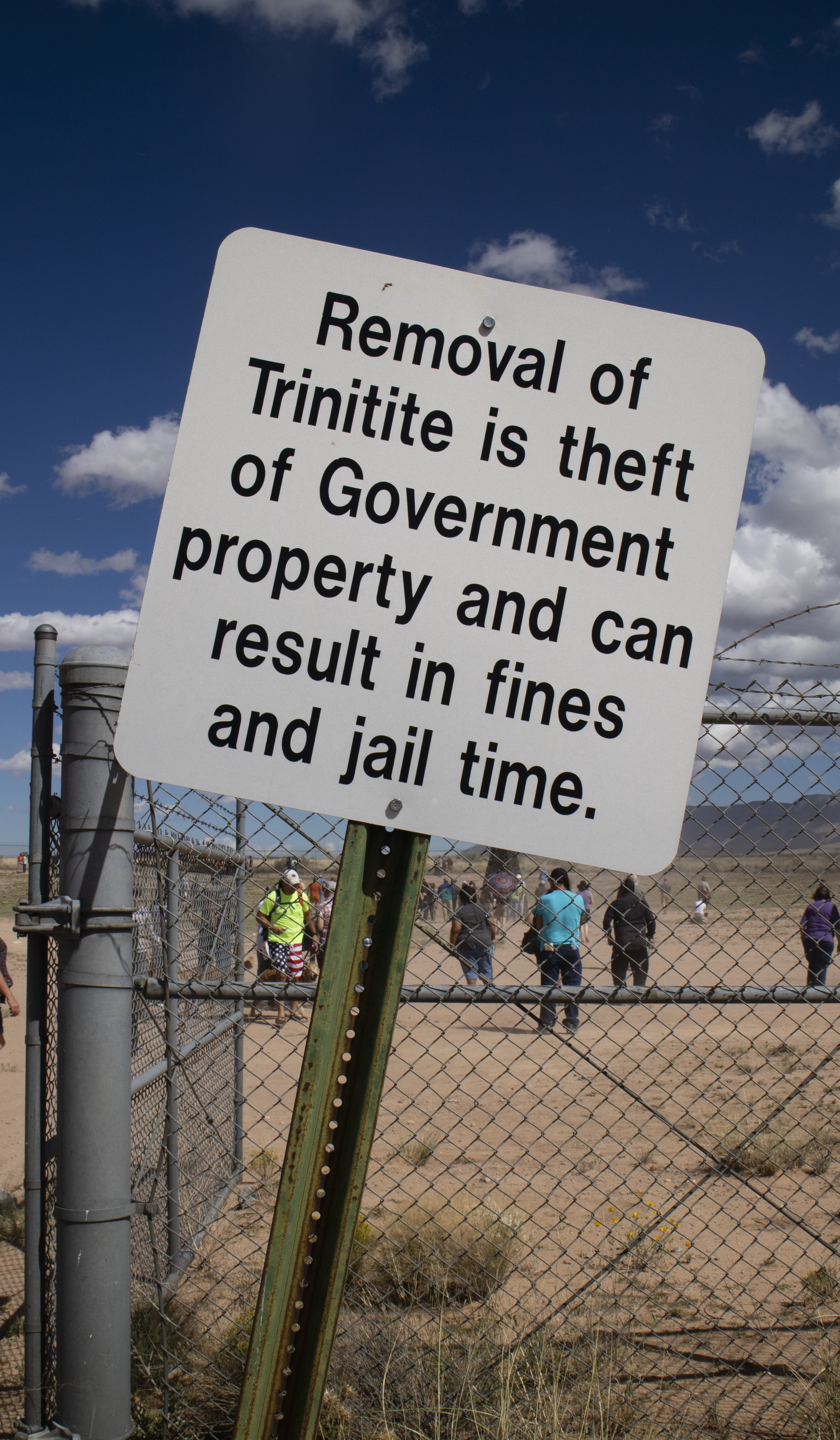
Sign warning against removal of trinitite, 2018

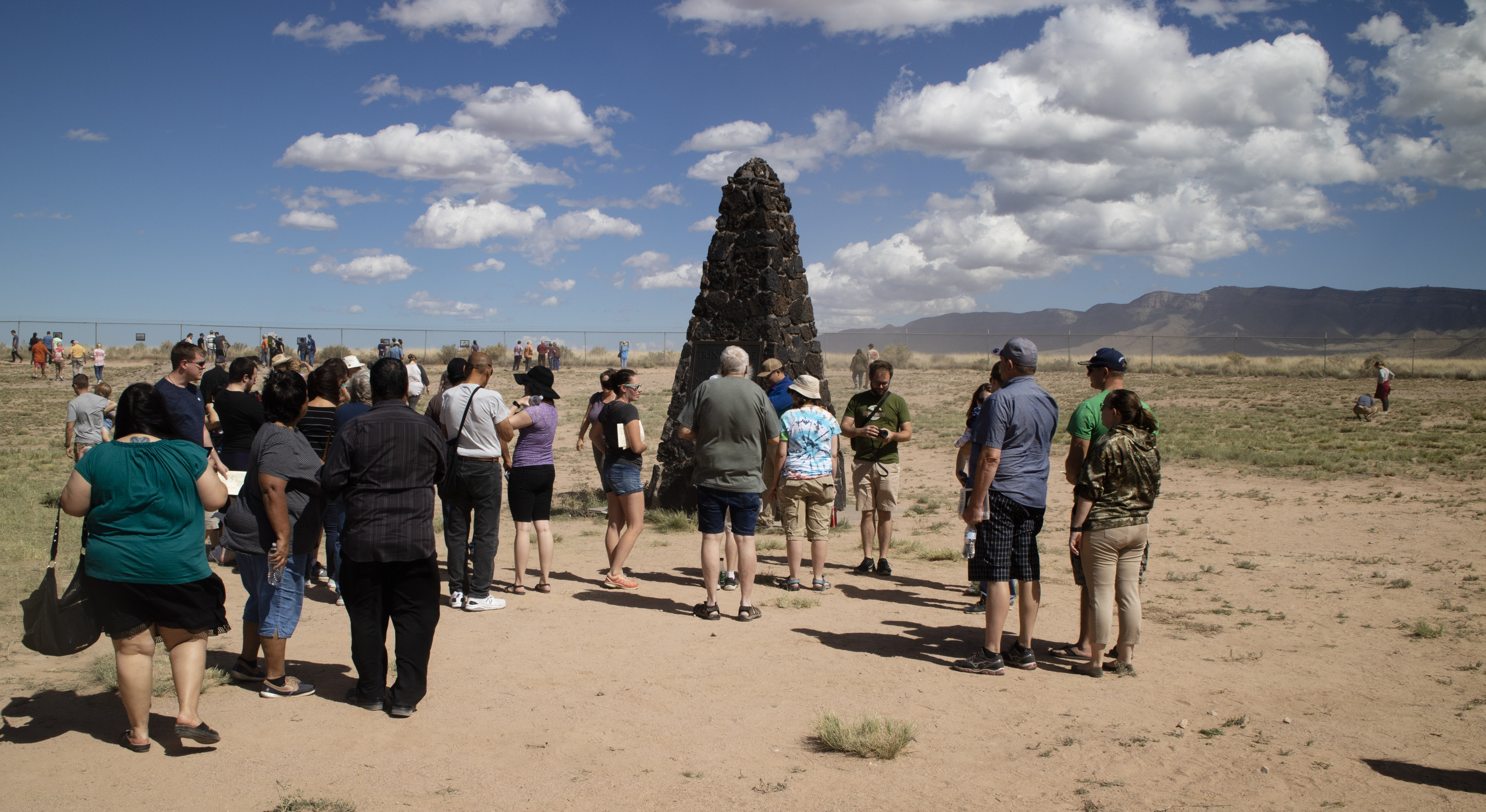
People gather around Ground Zero monument, 2018

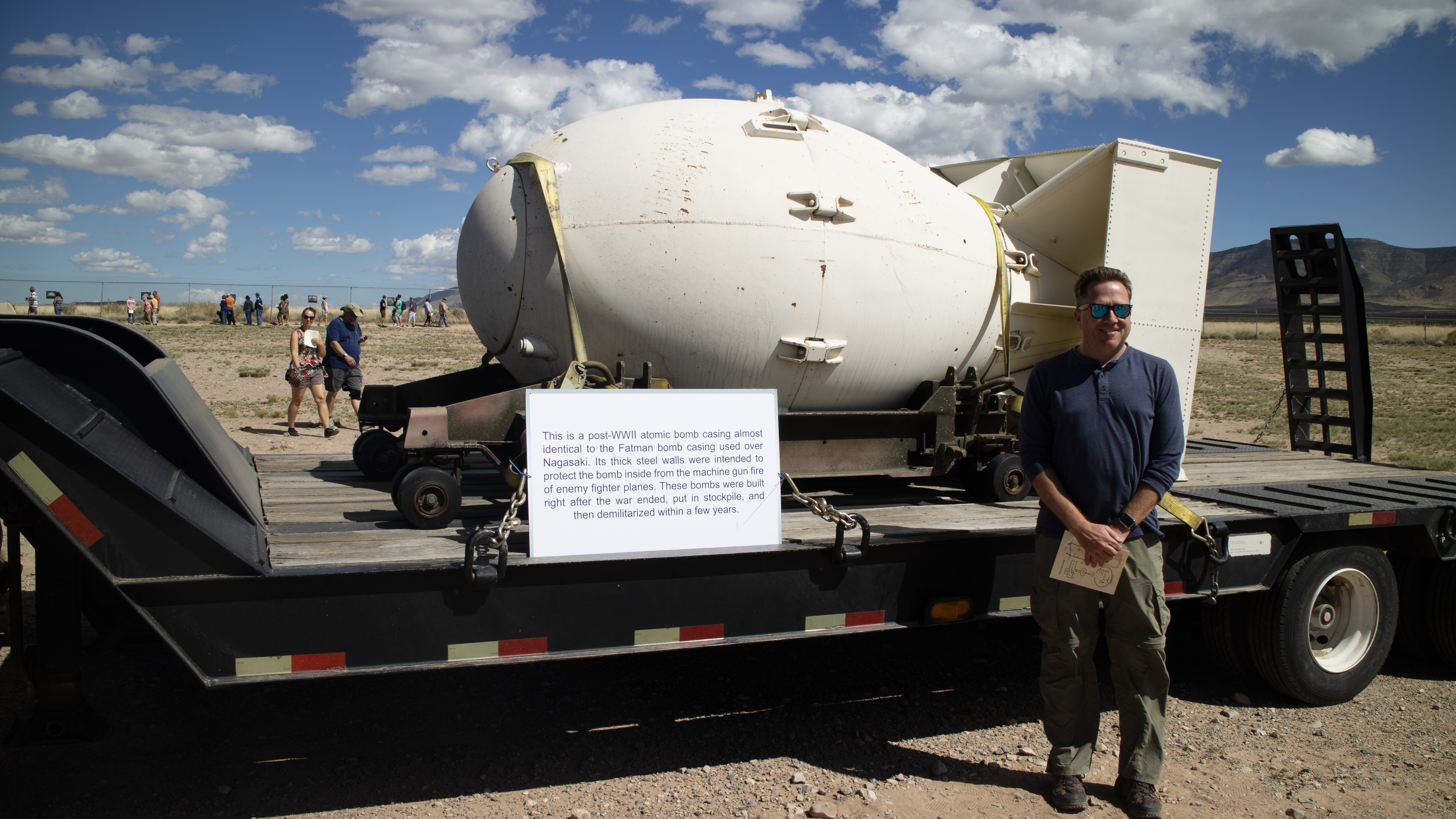
Post World War II Fat Man casing

== In popular culture ==
The Trinity test has been portrayed in various forms of media, including documentary films and dramatizations. In 1946, an 18-minute documentary titled Atomic Power was produced by Time Inc. under The March of Time banner and released theatrically. It featured many people involved with the project, including J. Robert Oppenheimer and Ernest Lawrence, as actors in re-creations of real discussions and events that led up to the Trinity test. In 1947, a docudrama titled The Beginning or the End chronicled the development of nuclear weapons and portrayed the Trinity test.

In 1980, a television drama miniseries titled Oppenheimer, a co-production between the British Broadcasting Corporation and the American television station WGBH-TV, aired for seven episodes on BBC Two. The Trinity test is depicted in its fifth episode. In early 1981, a documentary titled The Day After Trinity was released, focusing closely on the events of the Trinity test. In 1989, a feature film titled Fat Man and Little Boy depicted the Trinity test. Two documentaries, Trinity and Beyond and The Bomb, were released in 1995 and 2015 respectively. The 2017 third season of Twin Peaks prominently features a fantastical depiction of the Trinity test as part of a flashback in its eighth episode, providing an oblique origin story for the show's main antagonist, BOB.

Christopher Nolan, director of the 2023 film Oppenheimer, called the Trinity test "the fulcrum that the [film's] whole story turns on." He avoided depicting the explosion via computer-generated imagery, instead using practical effects: after a relatively small explosion (using gasoline, propane, aluminum powder, and magnesium) was filmed, forced perspective was used to give viewers the impression of a Trinity-sized explosion. The popularity of the film brought newfound attention to previous media depictions of the Trinity test, such as The Day After Trinity.
