= Mary Argo =

American physicist

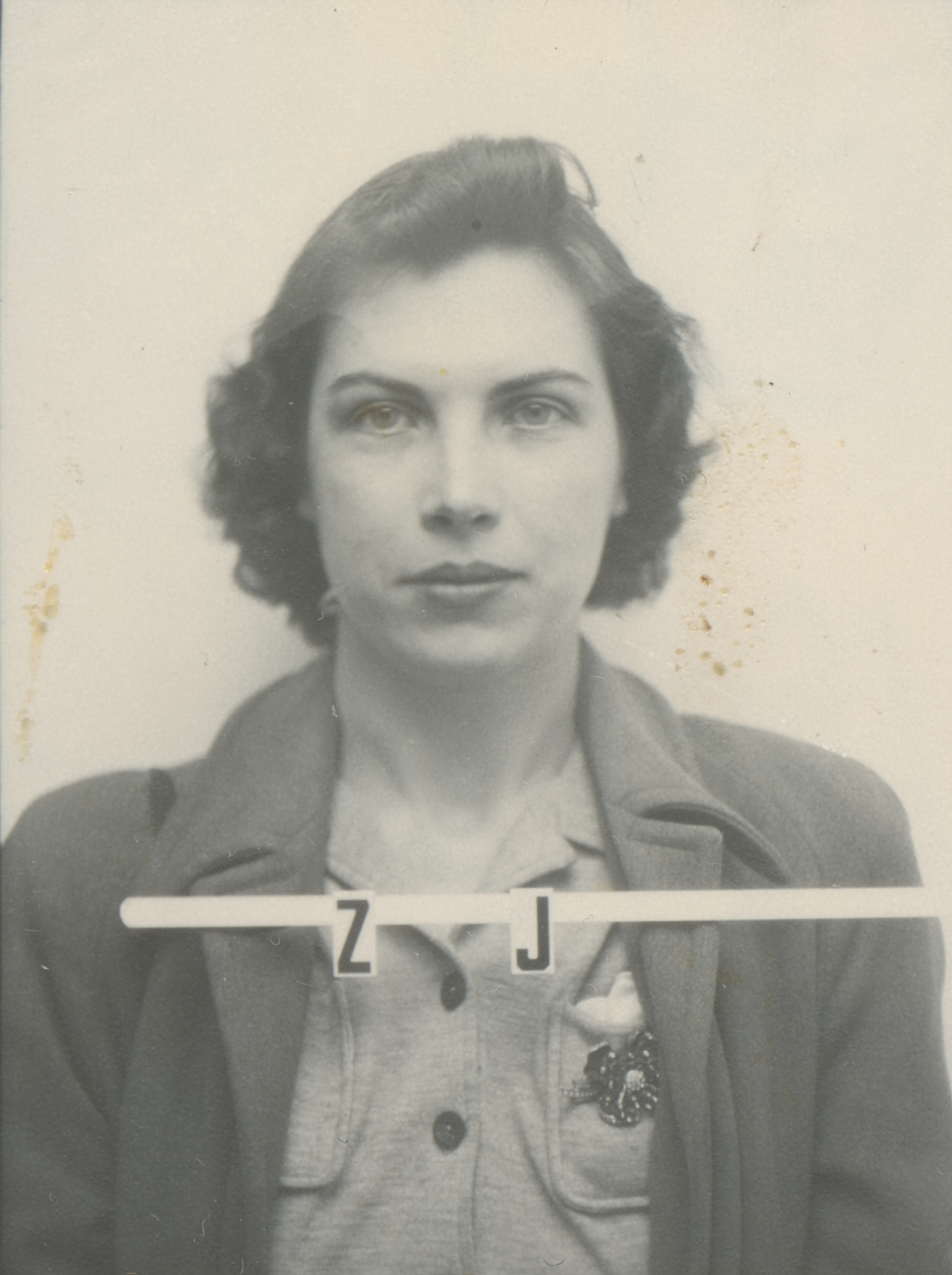
- Born: 'Mary Langs c. 1919; Michigan
- Died: 1984 (aged 64–65)
- Education: University of Washington, BA, 1939; Mills College, MA, 1941; George Washington University
- Known for: work on the Manhattan Project, witnessing the Trinity Test
- Spouse: Harold V. Argo
- Scientific career
- Fields: Physics
- Workplaces: George Washington University; Los Alamos National Laboratory
- Academic advisors: Edward Teller

Mary Langs Argo (née Langs; c. 1919–1984) was an American physicist who worked on the Manhattan Project. Argo was the only female staff member invited to witness the Trinity test.

== Education ==
Argo was born Mary Langs around 1919 in Michigan, and was raised in Detroit. Initially moving to Washington to study medicine, Argo became interested in physics and earned her Bachelor's in physics in 1939 at the University of Washington. In 1941, Argo earned her Master's in physics from Mills College.

The following year Argo began her doctoral studies at George Washington University under Edward Teller. That same year she met and married Harold V. Argo who was also a student of Teller. According to later recollections of her husband, Mary Argo found the university environment welcoming to women. She taught the introductory physics class at the university after many staff members left to work on war-related projects.

== Career ==
In 1944 Mary and Harold Argo followed Teller to Los Alamos where they both worked on the Manhattan Project in the Theoretical Group developing a fusion weapon. From 1944 to 1946 Argo performed calculations on deuterium-deuterium and deuterium-tritium burning.

On July 16, 1945, Argo witnessed the Trinity test and was the only female staff member at Los Alamos officially invited to do so. Argo likely learned about the test from Teller. She and Harold Argo watched the test through binoculars from Chupadera Peak, which was approximately 30 miles from ground zero of the test.

In 1946 Argo moved with her husband to Chicago, again following Teller, where Harold worked on his Ph.D. at the University of Chicago. The Argos lived on the top floor of Maria Goeppert Mayer's house. During this time, Mary Argo stayed at home while they started a family, eventually having four children.

In 1948 the Argos moved back to Los Alamos. From 1948 to 1960, Argo worked at Los Alamos National Laboratory on calculations of opacity as well as the effect of temperature and pressure on different materials. Argo continued to stay in touch with Teller and collaborated with him on various research projects.

== Death and legacy ==
Argo died in 1984. Her husband Harold Argo died in 2003.

A scholarship was established in her honor for female high school seniors from Los Alamos High School who show promise in the sciences or arts. The Mary Langs Argo Memorial Scholarship was administerd by the J. Robert Oppenheimer Memorial Committee from 1986 to 2004. In 2004, after Harold Argo's death, the scholarship's name was changed to the Mary and Harold Argo Memorial Scholarship.
