= Green River Launch Complex =

US Cold War rocket launch installation

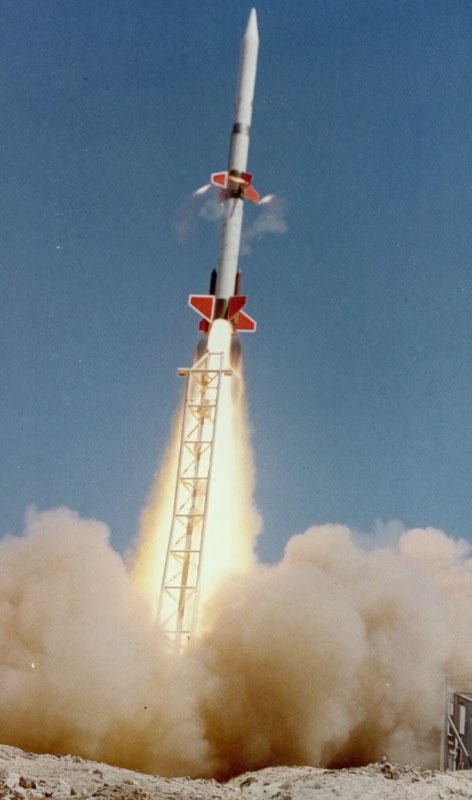
Athena launch from one of the 3 launch pads at the complex, which was also known as: Green River Test Site Green River Test Complex Green River Missile Launching Site Green River Launch Complex

The Utah Launch Complex was a Cold War military subinstallation of White Sands Missile Range for USAF and US Army rocket launches. In addition to firing Pershing missiles, the complex launched Athena RTV missiles with subscale (test) warheads of the Advanced Ballistic Re-entry System to reentry speeds and impact at the New Mexico range. From 1964 to 1975 there were 244 Green River launches, including 141 Athena launches and 60 Pershing 1 and Pershing 1a launches to 281 kilometers altitude. "Utah State Route 19 runs through the Green River Launch Complex, which is south of the town and eponym of Green River."

== Facilities ==
Originally 3,450 acres (1,400 ha), the installation had several separated areas:

=== Cantonment area ===
The post area had the entrance, headquarters and other offices, a fire station, telephone exchange, housing, and maintenance facilities. Prefabricated buildings (7) were for "supply, a telephone exchange, and engineer and transportation use", and "59 trailers [were] used as bachelor officers' quarters, offices, a mess hall, a laundry, and a latrine" ("city of trailers").

=== Athena storage area ===
"Adjacent to the cantonment area [were] storage facilities for the Athena missile rocket motors" (e.g., Thiokol XM-33 E8 Castor (rocket stage) augmented by 2 Thiokol XM-19 EL Recruit for the 1st stage.) Athena support at the Army's Green River installation's was the responsibility of the Ogden Air Materiel Area (OOAMA) at Hill Air Force Base, where ammunition igloos stored Athena rocket motors (OOAMA calibration specialists deployed to the Green River site.)

=== Athena Launch Complex ===
Facilities "approximately five miles from the entrance of the site" included a blockhouse and 3 concrete launching pad each with a rail-movable temperature-controlled steel building:

- Green River Pad 1 (38.9417°N 110.0776°W): 40 launches July 8, 1964 – August 20, 1971;
- Green River Pad 2 (38.9413°N 110.0753°W): 41 launches February 10, 1964 – September 25, 1969;
- Green River Pad 3 (38.9426°N 110.0741°W): 49 launches November 28, 1964 – September 17, 1971.

=== Safety zone ===
A "fall-back" area extended downrange as a 12,000-acre (4,900 ha) safety zone for impact when an Athena malfunctioned during early flight, e.g., the 2nd Athena RTV fired (May 1963) "was destroyed shortly after launch."

=== Geyer Site ===
The Pershing Launch Complex with positions 1-1, 1-2, 1-3 and 2-1, 2-2, 2-3 where vehicles (e.g., mobile launchers) were emplaced for firings. The Pershing area also had a landfill.

=== Green River Radar Complex ===
A government instrumentation site was "five miles to the southeast [with] radars, telemetry, optical systems, frequency monitoring", and other equipment (an organization was the "radar and communications division")--cf. "a separate instrumentation site on a mountain ridge near the northern border of the facility" for tracking.

=== Range Communications Station Charlie 401 ===
Range Communications Station Charlie 401

=== Meteorology compound ===
A 500 ft (150 m) meteorological tower was on the complex,

=== Pistol range ===
The complex had a firearms range (e.g., for military police proficiency).

=== Off-post sites ===
Related off-post sites included the nearby civilian Atlantic Research Corporation Assembly Area at a 1940s/50s Union Carbide uranium/vanadium facility outside of the Army complex where the company assembled Athenas as the prime contractor. Atlantic's "support operations and missile assembly area" of ~25,000 sq ft (0.57 acres) included a "missile assembly building...payload assembly building, support operations building, balance building and storage area" (a water tower was also in the fenced compound.) The Athena Booster Drop Zone 1 (FUDS J08UT3006 in San Juan County) was a downrange "impact zone" for the Athena 1st-stage booster to nominally land after separation (32 residents in the zone were evacuated for 1/2 hour or less, e.g., ranchers were given per diem.) "The impact dispersion area lay about 45 miles southeast of Green River, between the Colorado River and the north edge of the Manti-LaSal National Forest [with ~5% in] Canyonlands National Park." (The drop zone for Athena stage 2 was located in New Mexico.) Green River complex personnel also oversaw operations at Utah's White Mesa radar complex and a Pershing launch site and safety area in southeast Utah—the Black Mesa Missile Launching Range had 34 firings May 26, 1965 – November 13, 1968, from 38.6078°N 110.5980°W on Gilson Butte (operations relocated to Green River in 1971.)

== Background ==
White Sands Proving Ground began off-range firing with a 1956 Rascal missile launched near Orogrande, New Mexico, to an impact zone on WSPG (cf. a 1960s MGM-29 Sergeant launched from Datil, New Mexico). In Texas, an AN/FPS-78 radar emplaced with the 195x AN/FPS-17 radar at the Laredo Missile Tracking Site for WSMR tests was used in the 1962 Cuban Missile Early Warning System (later used for Athena/ABRES.) Pershing missile launches began at the Atlantic Missile Range in 1960, and in 1961 Air Force Systems Command (AFSC) began the Athena missile program "as part of the Advanced Ballistic Re-entry System [ABRES] program". The 1961 Target Tracking Radar was used to create recordings of radar reception from Cape Canaveral warheads, "chunks of the booster rocket", and "nose cone decoys" during reentry for use as simulated "ghost" missile input during WSMR's Zeus "synthetic intercept" program:. WSMR LC 38's Discrimination Radar and the 1961 Target Tracking Radar from the Nike-Zeus program were later used "as part of a re-entry signature studies program".

== Development ==
Selected by Carlos Bustamante, in September 1962 the Green River site was approved for "Athena subscale tests of ABRES"—land acquisition was initiated by the US Army Corps of Engineers' Sacramento District in late December. "In 1963 the ABRES program became a national effort", and by July 2, 1963, 1,600 acres (650 ha) was granted by the Utah State Land Board—the Bureau of Land Management granted 11,098 acres (4,491 ha). Support structures, utilities, and roads were built by Olson Construction Company during a $1,235,072 contract; and facilities eventually totalled over $3 million. Off-site, the 1963 Holloman AFB program for Athena/ABRES installed "two 3 megawatt dual frequency L-band and UHF radar systems" by Continental Electronics (AFMDC's RAM Site at Rhodes Canyon and the "Stallion radar site located uprange" on WSMR were "used to obtain the crossrange aspect of re-entry data.") A USAF tenant was assigned to Green River as part of AFSC's Air Force Ballistic Systems Division at Norton Air Force Base. In California, the original "Atlas 576 SMS ICBM pad" with gantry became the Vandenberg AFB ABRES complex in September 1964 to launch ICBMs for reentry vehicle (RV) testing (moved from the Eastern Test Range).

== Operations ==
The 1st Athena launch was February 10, 1964, from Pad 2 which failed "and fell near Durango, Colo" (cf. the Pershing launched November 1964 that landed near Creede, Colorado) and the 2nd firing in May "was destroyed shortly after launch." On July 8, 1964, the 1st "successful Athena/ABRES test missile" from the site landed at WSMR (at night for optical tracking of reentry). A September 11, 1967 Pershing landed in Mexico, as did a July 11, 1970 Athena that landed in Durango (Operation Great Sand returned Mexico Cobalt 57 contamination—60 drums—to a WSMR site.)

The support and maintenance contract for the cantonment area transferred from Dynalectron's Land-Air Division to Bendix Field Engineering Corporation on February 1, 1965. In 1966, the series of test firings was "rescheduled to last through 1967"—the new contract extended Athena operations beyond the original 77 launches (contracted for $65 million) to have 36 additional launches for $14 million. On May 13, 1975, from the Geyer Site, a Luftwaffe missile wing (German: Flugkörpergeschwader (FKW1)) launched the 300th Pershing.

== Aftermath ==
Following the Green River complex's last launches (Athena in 1971 & Pershing in 1975), Pershing launches moved to Fort Wingate, New Mexico. For a time the Army leased several cantonment buildings to the city of Green River (to which a Loki Dart missile was given and is exhibited at the city park.) A similar 1970s "Radar Discrimination Technology (RDT) program" was begun by the Lincoln Laboratory, and the Green River complex was on caretaker status 1976-86 when the site became "inactive in 1979"--"the base was officially deactivated in 1983". A March 1983 site inventory was conducted by David G. Buchanan and John P. Johnson, assisted by Sgt. Maj. L. Sexton—the report identified 6,309 acres (2,553 ha) "of exclusive use" property and 11,872 acres (4,804 ha) "of co-use property." The "Green River Test Site was placed on the federal agency hazardous waste compliance docket on June 27, 1997." By 2003 when part of "the original 3,450 acres of land" was owned/leased by White Sands (some was also state school trustlands and BLM lands), the cantonment area was being considered for declaration as excess property. By 2007, the Annual Intercollegiate Rocket Launch Competition was being held near Crystal Geyser on former Green River complex land, where 37 buildings remained in February 2014, such as the reinforced concrete blockhouse (Building 50207) for Athena Pads 1 & 2 (Buildings 50253 & 50291) which also remain. A draft assessment for demolition of the site's buildings was completed in 2014.

== Current status ==
The complex was dismantled as of 3/2/2025 or sooner. Part of the former launch site now houses the Green River Uranium Disposal Cell Green River Uranium Disposal Cell | The Center for Land Use Interpretation, and holds radioactive material from the nearby UMTRA Project in Moab and several other sites.
