= 6th Space Warning Squadron =

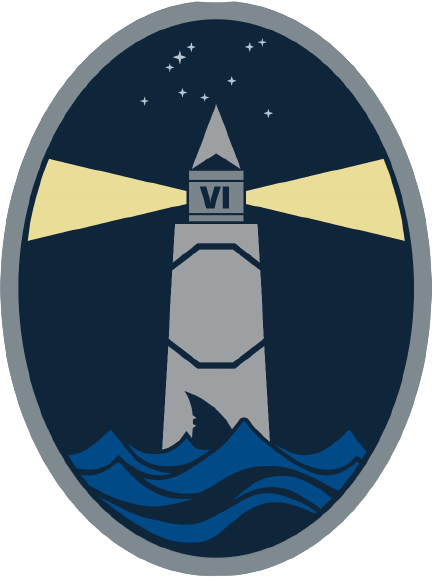
- Emblem of the 6th Space Warning Squadron
- Active: 1979–present
- Country: United States
- Branch: United States Space Force
- Role: Missile warning and space surveillance
- Part of: Space Delta 4
- Garrison/HQ: Cape Cod Space Force Station
- Motto: Ever Aware
- Decorations: AFOUA

Commanders
- Current commander: Lt Col Bryan Becker
- Notable commanders: Nina Armagno

Insignia
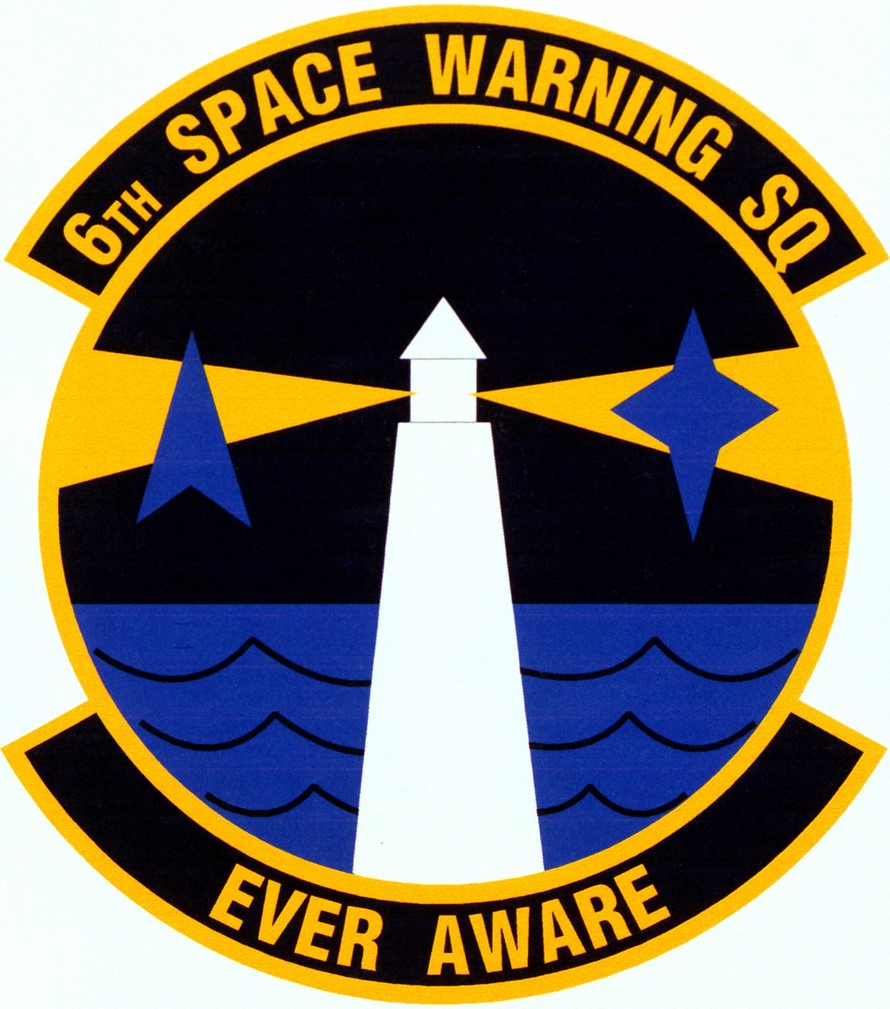
- Previous Air Force insignia

The 6th Space Warning Squadron is located at Cape Cod Space Force Station, in Sagamore, Massachusetts, United States. It operates the PAVE PAWS radar to watch for missiles launched toward North America. The squadron is assigned to Space Delta 4. The squadron was first organized in October 1979 as the 6th Missile Warning Squadron.

== Mission ==
The mission of the 6th SWS is to observe United States coasts for incoming sea–launched or intercontinental ballistic missiles using the PAVE PAWS radar system. Also, the 6th is to determine the potential threat of the numbers and destination of incoming missiles; then report continuous information to the North American Aerospace Defense Command, Cheyenne Mountain Space Force Station, and NORTHCOM.

== History ==
The 6th Space Warning Squadron was founded at Cape Cod Missile Early Warning Station in August 1977. It was the first squadron in the country to be equipped with PAVE PAWS.

PAVE PAWS also generates information on the location and velocity of earth-orbiting satellites to NORAD.

The squadron also had a detachment at North Truro Air Force Station from 1977 to 1985, when the station closed and operations at the accompanying radar dome were taken over by the Federal Aviation Administration. The 2165th Communications Squadron was a separate tenant at CCAFS until 1986 when it was merged with the 6th SWS.

== Lineage ==
- Constituted as the 6th Missile Warning Squadron

Activated on 1 October 1979
Redesignated 6th Space Warning Squadron on 15 May 1992

=== Assignments ===
- 21st Air Division, 1 October 1979
- Aerospace Defense Command 1 October 1979
- 45th Air Division, 1 December 1979
- 1st Space Wing, 1 May 1983
- 21st Operations Group, 15 May 1992 – present

=== Stations ===
- Cape Cod Space Force Station, Massachusetts, 1 October 1979 – present

=== Awards and decorations ===
- Air Force Outstanding Unit Award
  - 1 January 1998 – 31 December 1998
  - 1 October 1997 – 30 September 1999
  - 1 October 1995 – 30 September 1997
  - 2014
- 2004 Partridge Slemon Award as North American Aerospace Defense Command's most outstanding unit for its support of the common defense and partnership in protecting the U.S. and Canadian homelands

== List of commanders ==
- Col Judson 1989
- Col 1990-1993
- Col Richard Cable
- Col Mario V. Mascola
- Col William R. Smith
- Lt Col Craig Z. Lowry, 29 June 1995 – ???
- Lt Col Paul Hamilton
- Lt Col Christopher R. Gentry
- Lt Col J. Arnett
- Lt Col C. Lowery
- Lt Col Robert Keyser
- Lt Col James C Hutto Jr 1999-2001
- Lt Col Jeffrey C. Wilson 2001-2003
- Lt Col Nina Armagno, June 2003 – December 2004
- Lt Col Paul S. Hamilton, 14 December 2004 – 10 August 2006
- Lt Col Max E. Lantz II, June 2008 – June 2010
- Lt Col Shawn Smith, June 2010 – 2012
- Lt Col Walt Jackim, 2012 – 27 June 2014
- Lt Col David Anderson, 27 June 2014 – ???
- Lt Col Nathan J. Hippe, ??? – 28 June 2018
- Lt Col James E. Roberts, 28 June 2018 – 23 June 2020
- Lt Col Timothy Sheehan, 23 June 2020 – June 2022
- Lt Col Stewart C. Smith, June 2022 – 12 June 2024
- Lt Col Bryan Becker, 12 June 2024 – present
