= 8th Space Warning Squadron =

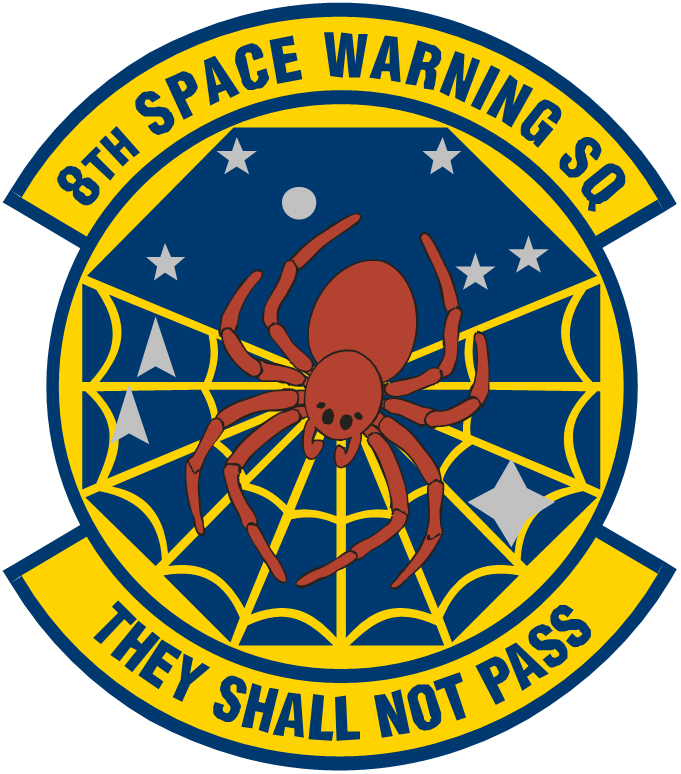
- 8th Space Warning Squadron emblem; (approved 30 June 1988)
- Active: 1986-1995, 1997-1998; 1999–present
- Country: United States
- Branch: United States Air Force
- Role: Missile Warning
- Part of: Air Force Reserve Command
- Garrison/HQ: Buckley Space Force Base, Colorado
- Motto(s): They Shall not Pass
- Decorations: Air Force Outstanding Unit Award

The United States Air Force's 8th Space Warning Squadron is an Air Force Reserve missile warning unit located at Buckley Space Force Base, Colorado. The 8th works alongside its active duty counterpart, the 2d Space Warning Squadron, on the Defense Support Program and Space-Based Infrared System programs.

== History ==
The 8th Missile Warning Squadron was activated on 1 April 1986 at Eldorado Air Force Station, Texas, under Air Force Space Command. It was reassigned to the 1st Space Wing on 8 May 1987. While at Eldorado, the unit operated the AN/FPS-115 Pave Paws radar, provided warning of sea-launched or intercontinental ballistic missile attack against the continental United States or southern Canada.

The unit was redesignated as the 8th Space Warning Squadron on 15 May 1992 and reassigned to the 21st Operations Group. It was reassigned to the 21st Space Wing on 8 June 1995 before inactivating on 30 September 1995.

It was redesignated as the 8th Space Operations Squadron on 22 August 1997 and briefly activated in the reserve under the 310th Space Group on 1 September 1997 at Falcon Air Force Base, Colorado. It inactivated there on 1 October 1998.

Redesignated as the 8th Space Warning Squadron on 30 July 1999, it was activated in the reserve on 1 October 1999 at Buckley Air National Guard Base, Colorado, under the 310 Space Group, 1 Oct 1999.

== Lineage ==
- Constituted as the 8th Missile Warning Squadron on 26 March 1986

Activated on 1 April 1986
Redesignated 8th Space Warning Squadron on 15 May 1992
Inactivated on 30 September 1995

- Redesignated 8th Space Operations Squadron on 22 August 1997

Activated in the reserve on 1 September 1997
Inactivated on 1 October 1998

- Redesignated 8th Space Warning Squadron on 30 July 1999

Activated in the reserve on 1 October 1999

=== Assignments ===
- Air Force Space Command, 1 April 1986
- 1st Space Wing, 8 May 1987
- 21st Operations Group, 15 May 1992
- 21st Space Wing, 8 June–30 September 1995
- 310th Space Group, 1 September 1997 – 1 October 1998
- 310th Space Group, 1 October 1999
- 310th Operations Group, 7 March 2008 – present

=== Stations ===
- Eldorado Air Force Station (later Eldorado Air Station), Texas, 1 April 1986 – 30 September 1995
- Falcon Air Force Base (later Schriever Air Force Base), Colorado, 1 September 1997 – 1 October 1998
- Buckley Air National Guard Base (later Buckley Air Force Base, then Buckley Space Force Base), Colorado, 1 October 1999 – present

=== Equipment operated ===
- Space-Based Infrared System (???-present)
- Defense Support Program (1997–present)
- AN/FPS-115 PAVE PAWS (1986–1995)

=== Decorations ===
- Air Force Outstanding Unit Awards: 1 September 1989 – 31 August 1991; 1 October 1992 – 30 September 1994; 4 September 1997 – 1 November 1998

== See also ==
- Fourteenth Air Force
