= Laredo Air Force Station =

Laredo Air Force Station (FUDS Site No. K06TX021600) was a Cold War radar station of the United States Air Force in Texas.

It had an AN/FPS-17, an AN/FPS-78 (used during the 1962 Cuban Missile Crisis' Falling Leaves radar network), and the last Avco AN/FSS-7 SLBM Detection Radar. Northeast of Laredo, Texas, located at 27°37′08″N 099°23′12″W and supported by the city's Laredo Air Force Base, Laredo AFS tracked White Sands Missile Range tests, provided satellite tracks such as for the 1958 Sputnik III to Project Harvest Moon, and sent missile warning data to Cheyenne Mountain Complex's CCPDS computers.

== Laredo test site ==
On 22 July 1955, the military site was acquired (Air Training Command constructed the site) and in 1955, "an operations building for a high-power longrange radar facility was completed." Funding for the site was "from a special Air Force appropriation" and Rome Air Development Center was responsible for installation and operation of the site, which became operational in 1956.

By 1958, the XW-2 model of an AN/FPS-17 was at the station and on the 11 October 1958 mission 164 to track the satellite of the Sputnik III launch, tracked at 64 nmi (119 km; 74 mi) height an unidentified "radar target was picked up on a ground radar at the Laredo Test Site at at [sic] a range of 454 nautical miles and at 462 nautical miles at a height of 64 nautical miles. The targets [sic] lasted for a total of 28 seconds" (the target was "observed in three of four beams being energized".)

After a January 1959 plan included the "ARDC Laredo test site radars" as sensors for the "interim National Space Surveillance and Control Center", in 1960 the "Laredo test site assumed the function of tracking artificial satellites and reporting the data to Project "Harvest Moon". In July 1961 Air Defense Command acquired the site and by the end of 1961, the station had been developed with structures like ADC Permanent System radar stations (numerous planned Aircraft Control and Warning radars for NORAD monitoring over Mexico were cancelled.) Buildings included barracks, an orderly room building, etc.

1961 test sites at Trinidad and Laredo transferred from RADC on July 1.

By 1962, an AN/FPS-78 was at the Laredo Test Site, and it was used during the Cuban Missile Crisis to sweep over the trajectory area from Cuba after the sweep by an Alabama radar and before a New Jersey radar.

== Laredo sensor site ==
The Laredo Sensor Site was the station's name by August 30, 1961; and operations included projecting "an enlarged image of radar scope film [onto] a finely graduated scale on [a] screen" for tracking precision.

"The Laredo sensor was deactivated on 15 July 1964" and the "Air Force...reactivated it on 1 April 1966" (the 4783rd Surveillance Squadron was the station's 2nd unit, and the 665th Radar Squadron[./Laredo_Air_Force_Station#cite_note-Radomes-2 [2]] was also at the station.)

Detachment 8 of the 14th Missile Warning Squadron was established in the late 1960s at Laredo AFS.

The AN/FSS-7 mission of detecting SLBM launches/Space Surveillance and Satellite Tracking from Texas was taken over by a PAVE PAWS at Eldorado Air Force Station in 1987.

== Army Reserve and civilian prison ==
External image
- Laredo AN/FPS-17
- 1972? NORAD "Sea-Lanes Sentinel" Neg #72–299

On 22 May 1974, the station transferred to the Army and was used "for weekend training by local Army Reserve components" until deactivated in 1980.

The station including "firing range, small theater, library, cafeteria, officers club, NCO club, airman's club" (total of 13 buildings)--except for a small area of licensed land—transferred to the Webb County government on 16 October 1980; which by May 1992 had "converted the site into a prison" and storage area for vehicles seized by the U.S. Marshal Service.
