= Shavetail =

American rocket

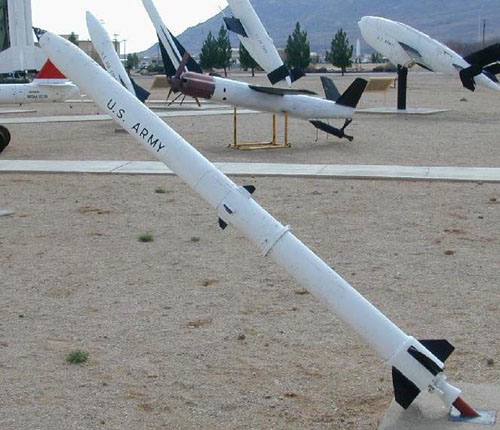
- Function: Experimental rocket
- Country of origin: United States

Size
- Height: 9 feet (2.7 m)
- Diameter: 6 inches (150 mm)
- Mass: 200 pounds (91 kg)
- Stages: One

Launch history
- Status: Retired
- Launch sites: White Sands Missile Range
- Total launches: 11
- First flight: August 1959
- Last flight: October 1959

Shavetail was an experimental American rocket developed during the 1950s. Used to evaluate the rapidly developing technology of rocketry, eleven Shavetail rockets were fired during 1959.

== Design and development ==
Intended to assist in the development of rocket and missile technologies, Shavetail was a small, inexpensive, unguided solid-fueled rocket that was capable of being modified to be tested in various configurations. Among the systems tested was one to ensure precise payload separation at motor burnout.

== Operational history ==
A series of eleven launches of the Shavetail rocket were conducted in late 1959, starting in August and ending in October. The maximum range of Shavetail was 6 miles (9.7 km).
