= Cape Cod Space Force Station =

US Space Force station in Massachusetts

- Part of Joint Base Cape Cod
- Near Sagamore, Massachusetts in the United States
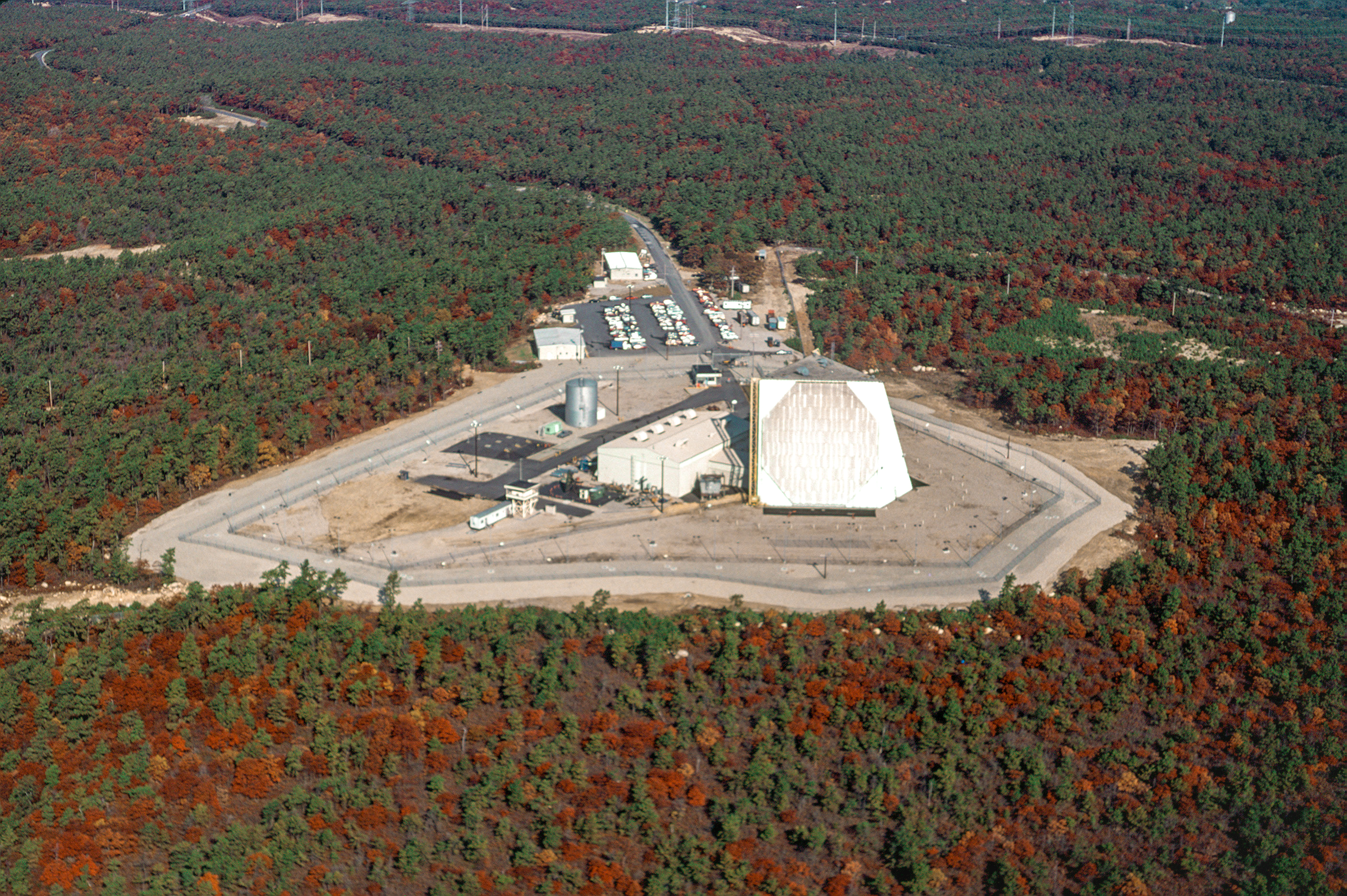
- Aerial view of Cape Cod Space Force Station during the mid-1980s

- Emblem of Space Base Delta 2

Site information
- Type: US Space Force Station
- Owner: Department of Defense
- Operator: United States Space Force
- Controlled by: Space Operations Command
- Condition: Operational
- Radar type: AN/FPS-123 PAVE PAWS (Phased Array Warning System)

Location
- Location in the United States Cape Cod SFS (the United States)
- Coordinates: 41°45′12″N 70°32′19″W

Site history
- Built: 1976–1980
- In use: 1980–present

Garrison information
- Garrison: Space Base Delta 2
- Occupants: 6th Space Warning Squadron

Cape Cod Space Force Station is a United States Space Force station located in the northwest corner of Joint Base Cape Cod, United States, on Flatrock Hill in Bourne, Massachusetts. Cape Cod Space Force Station began construction in 1976 as Cape Cod Missile Early Warning Station and was renamed Cape Cod Air Force Station in 1982, before assuming its current name in 2021.

Missile warning and space surveillance operations are conducted by Space Delta 4's 6th Space Warning Squadron while base administration is the responsibility of Buckley Garrison.

== History ==
On 27 August 1973, the United States Air Force directed the construction of two phased array missile warning radar systems, specifically to defend against the launch of submarine-launched ballistic missiles. On 23 May 1975 it was announced that the east coast site would be located at Otis Air Force Base at Cape Cod and the west coast site would be located at Beale Air Force Base. Construction on the Cape Cod Missile Warning Station began on 26 October 1976. On 1 October 1979, the 6th Missile Warning Squadron and 2165th Communications Squadron were established and the facility became operational on 4 April 1980 under Aerospace Defense Command's 21st Air Division. On 1 December 1979, Aerospace Defense Command's missile warning and space surveillance radars were transferred to Strategic Air Command, with Cape Cod Missile Warning Station becoming part of the 45th Air Division.

On 5 January 1982, Cape Cod Missile Warning Station's name was changed to Cape Cod Air Force Station and became part of Air Force Space Command's 1st Space Wing on 1 May 1983. In 1986, the 2165th Communications Squadron was merged into the 6th Missile Warning Squadron. On 15 May 1992, the 6th Missile Warning Squadron was redesignated as the 6th Space Warning Squadron and reassigned to the 21st Space Wing's 21st Operations Group. On 20 December 2019, the 6th Space Warning Squadron became part of the United States Space Force and on 24 July 2020, the 6th Space Warning Squadron became part of Space Delta 4 and Buckley Garrison became responsible for installation support.

On 11 June 2021, Cape Cod Air Force Station was renamed Cape Cod Space Force Station.

== Units ==
=== 6th Space Warning Squadron ===
The 6th Space Warning Squadron is responsible for operating the AN/FPS-132 Upgraded Early Warning Radar and is part of Space Delta 4. The 6th Space Warning Squadron has been the host unit at Cape Cod Space Force Station since 1979. In addition to Space Force guardians, there are a number of Royal Canadian Air Force airmen and airwomen assigned to the squadron. The primary mission of the squadron is to guard the United States and Canadian east coast against sea-launched and intercontinental ballistic missile attacks, which is then routed to the Missile Defense Agency and United States Space Command's Missile Warning Center for missile defense operations. The squadron's secondary mission is tracking low-earth-orbiting objects, such as the International Space Station, which is reported to the 18th Space Control Squadron.

== Base assignment and major units ==
Name	Military service	Assigned command	Higher headquarters/ garrison	Major units
Cape Cod Missile Warning Station (1 October 1979–5 January 1982)	United States Air Force	Aerospace Defense Command (1 October 1979–1 December 1979) Strategic Air Command (1 December 1979–1 May 1983)	21st Air Division (1 October 1979–1 December 1979) 45th Air Division (1 December 1979–1 May 1983)	6th Space Warning Squadron
Cape Cod Air Force Station (5 January 1982–11 June 2021)	United States Air Force	Air Force Space Command	1st Space Wing (1 May 1983–15 May 1992) 21st Space Wing (15 May 1992–24 July 2020)	6th Space Warning Squadron
Cape Cod Space Force Station (11 June 2021–present)	United States Space Force	Space Force Combat Forces Command	Space Base Delta 2	6th Space Warning Squadron

== Gallery ==
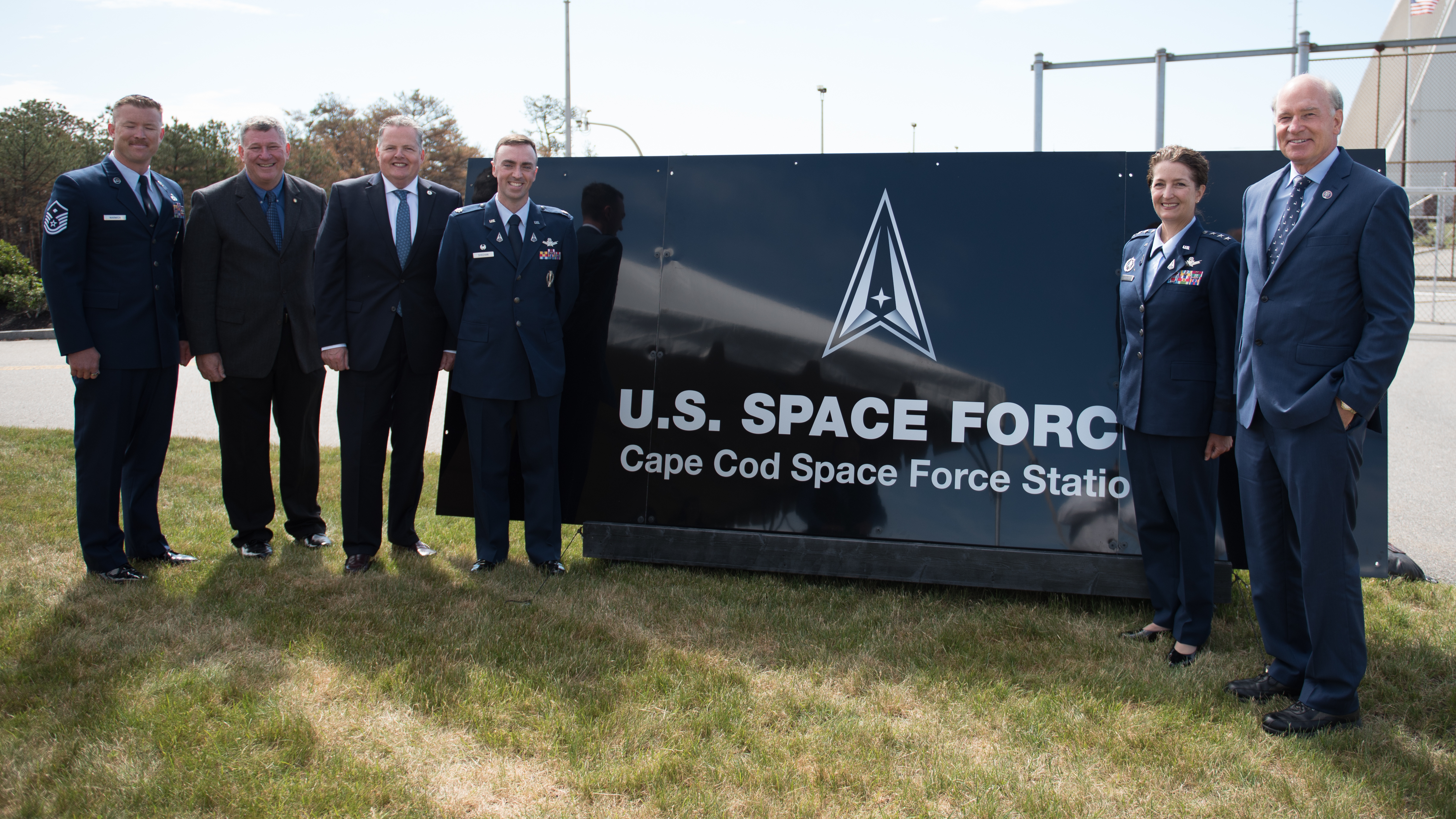
Lt. Gen. Nina Armagno, Rep. Bill Keating, Lt. Col. Timothy Sheehan, and other dignitaries attend the installation's redesignation as a Space Force Station.

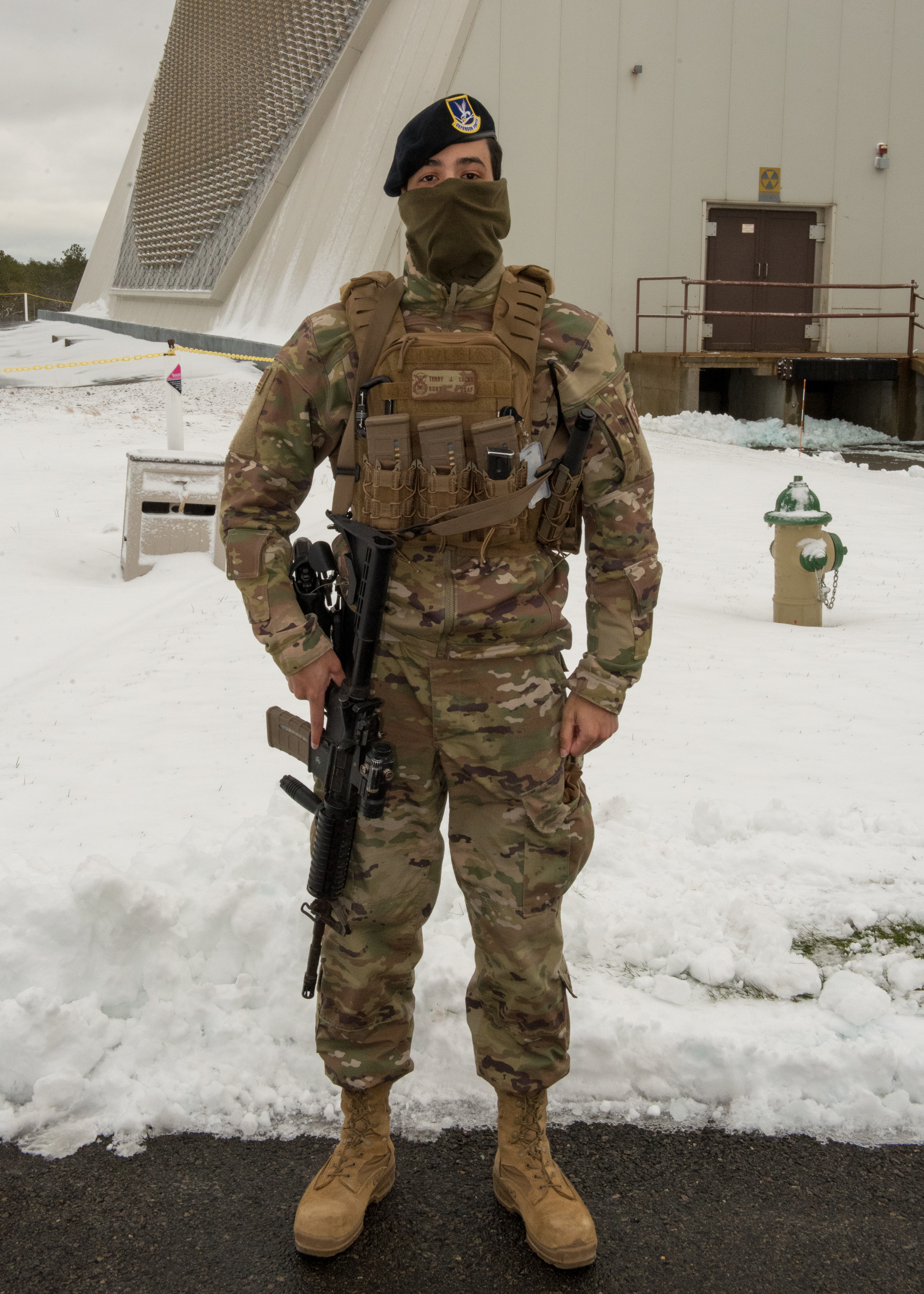
Member of Air Force Security Forces standing watch in front of the PAVE PAWS installation at Cape Cod SFS, 2021

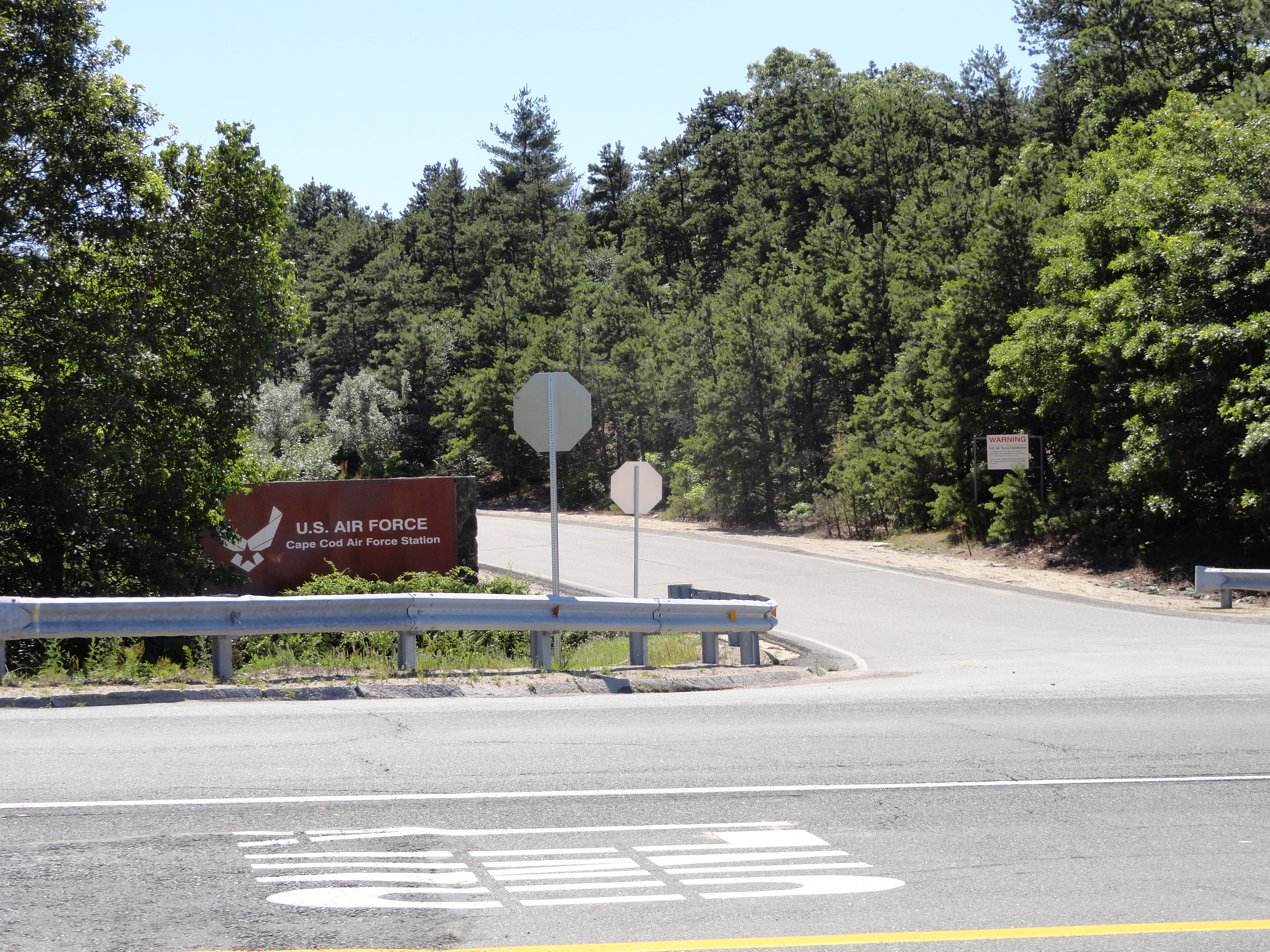
The entrance to the station while designated an Air Force Station

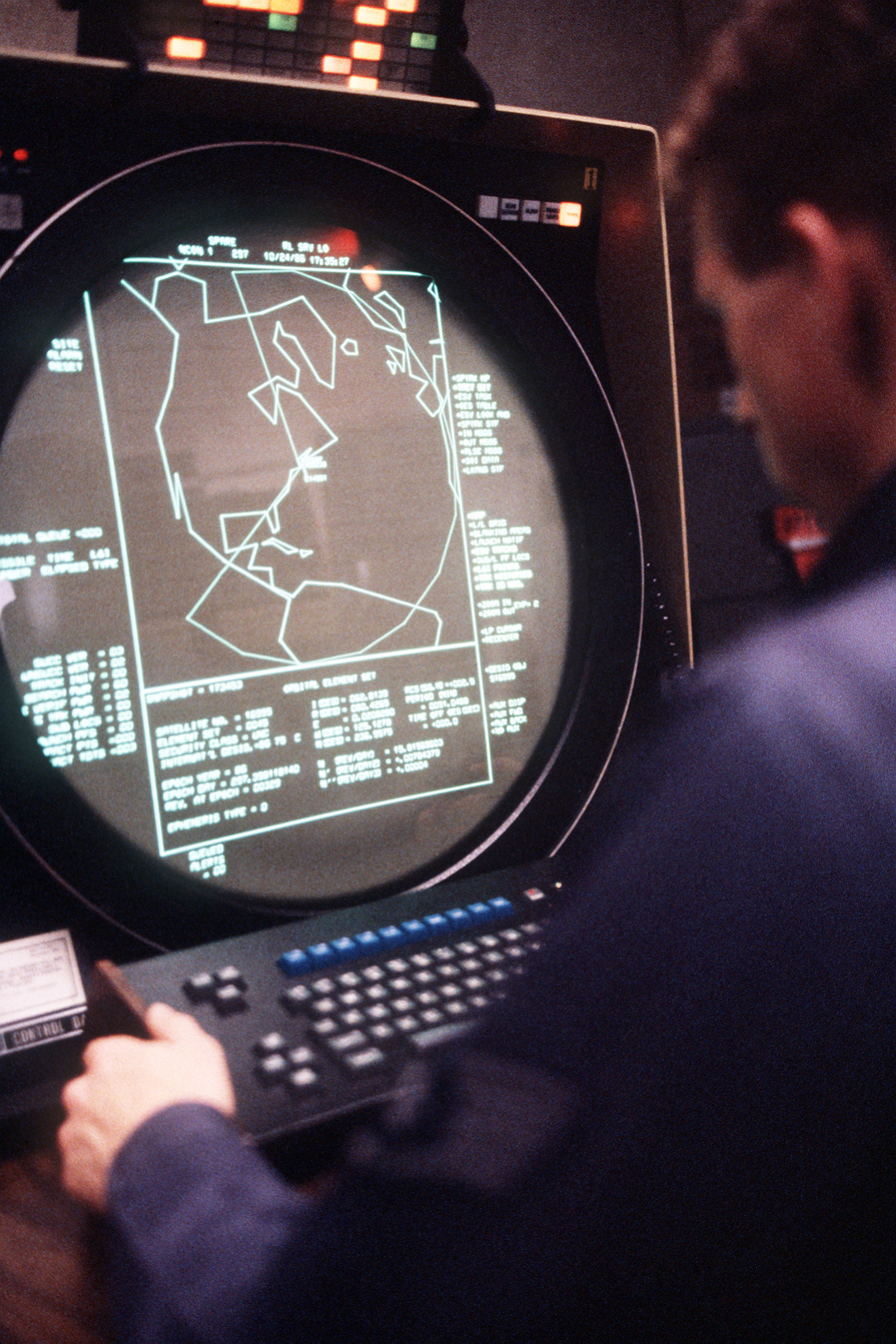
Radar screen for the PAVE PAWS at Cape Cod AFS, 1986

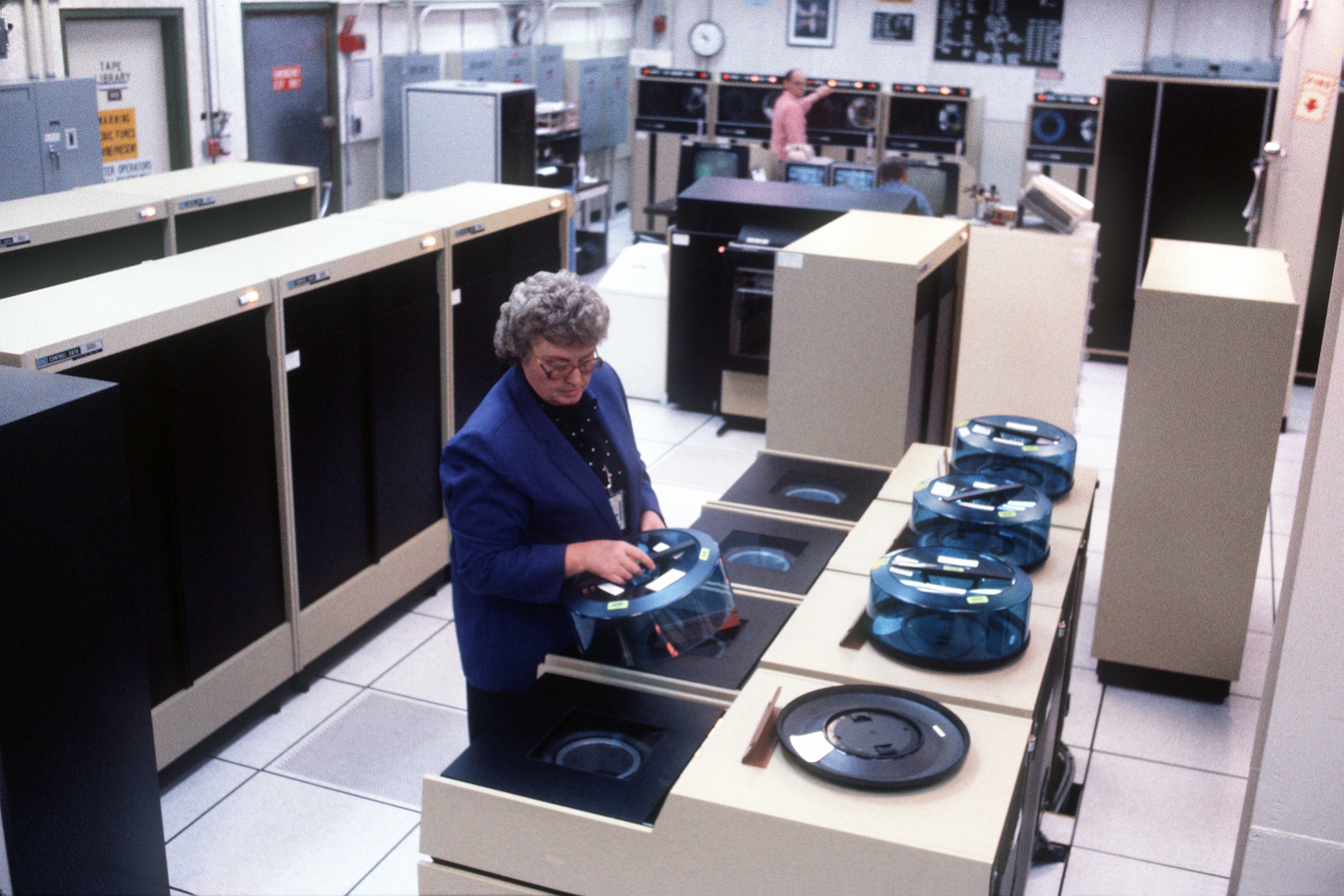
Computer room for PAVE PAWS at Cape Cod AFS, 1986. Note the four large hard disk units in the foreground.

== See also ==
- List of military installations in Massachusetts
- List of United States Space Force installations
