= PAVE PAWS =

Early warning radar

PAVE Phased Array Warning System
- Massachusetts, California, Florida and Texas in United States
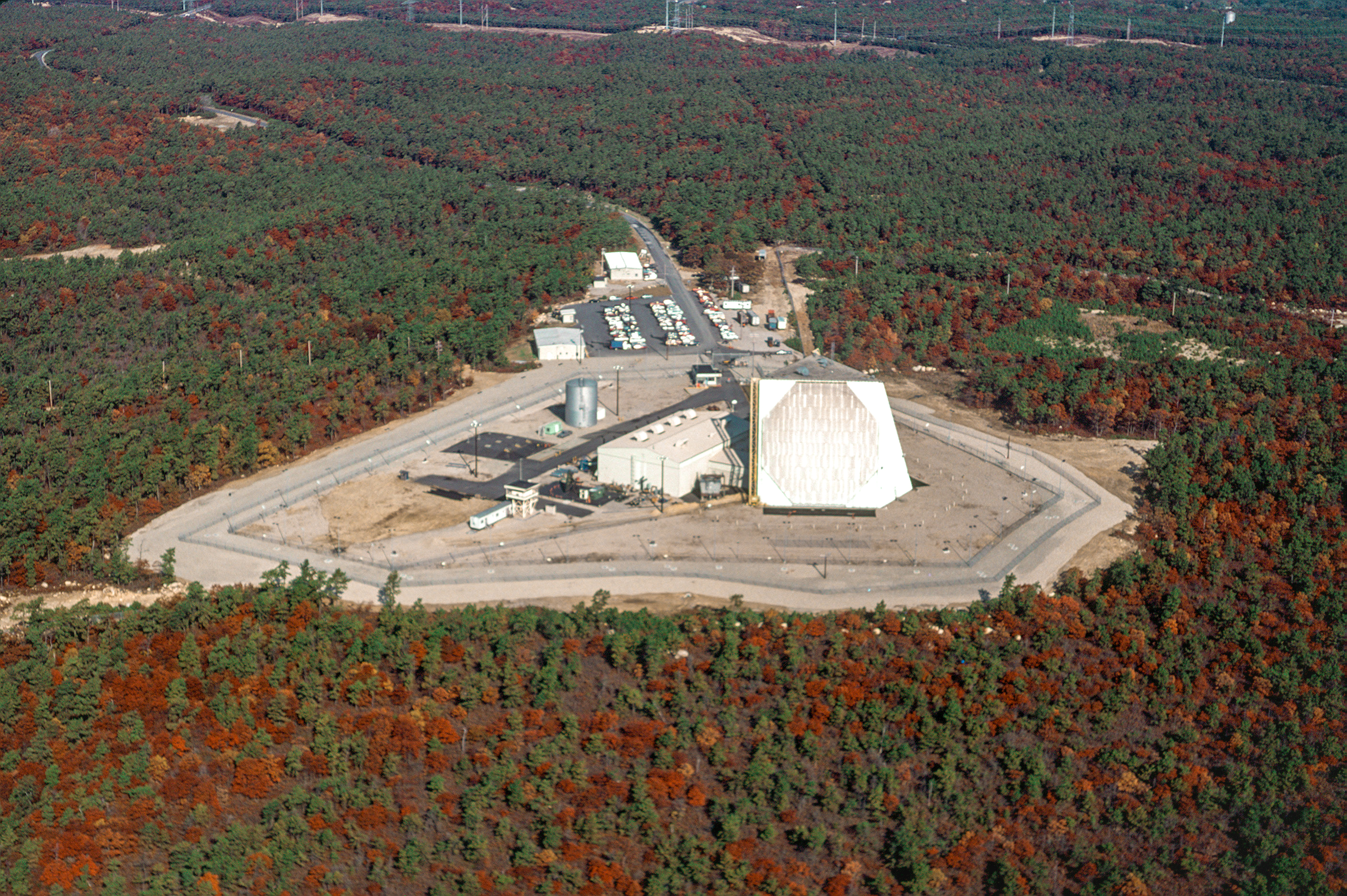
- The Cape Cod Space Force Station AN/FPS-115 (white structure with circular array) on 1 October 1986 was 1 of 2 while two more FPS-115s were being built. At the beginning of the Cold War, the Cape Cod landform had a Permanent System radar station (1951 North Truro AFS), and the offshore Texas Tower 2 was at George's Bank (closed 1963).

Site information
- Type: Radar station

PAVE PAWS (PAVE Phased Array Warning System) is a complex Cold War early warning radar and computer system developed in 1980 to "detect and characterize a sea-launched ballistic missile attack against the United States". The first solid-state phased array deployed used a pair of Raytheon AN/FPS-115 phased array radar sets at each site to cover an azimuth angle of 240 degrees. In accordance with the Joint Electronics Type Designation System, the "AN/FPS-115" designation represents the 115th design of an Army-Navy fixed radar(pulsed) electronic device for searching. Two sites were deployed in 1980 at the periphery of the contiguous United States, then two more in 1987–95 as part of the United States Space Surveillance Network. One system was sold to Taiwan and is still in service.

== Mission ==
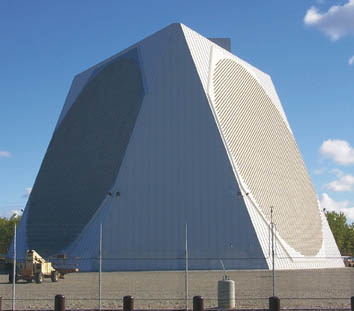
PAVE PAWS transmitter building, Clear Space Force Station, Alaska, showing the two circular phased array antennas

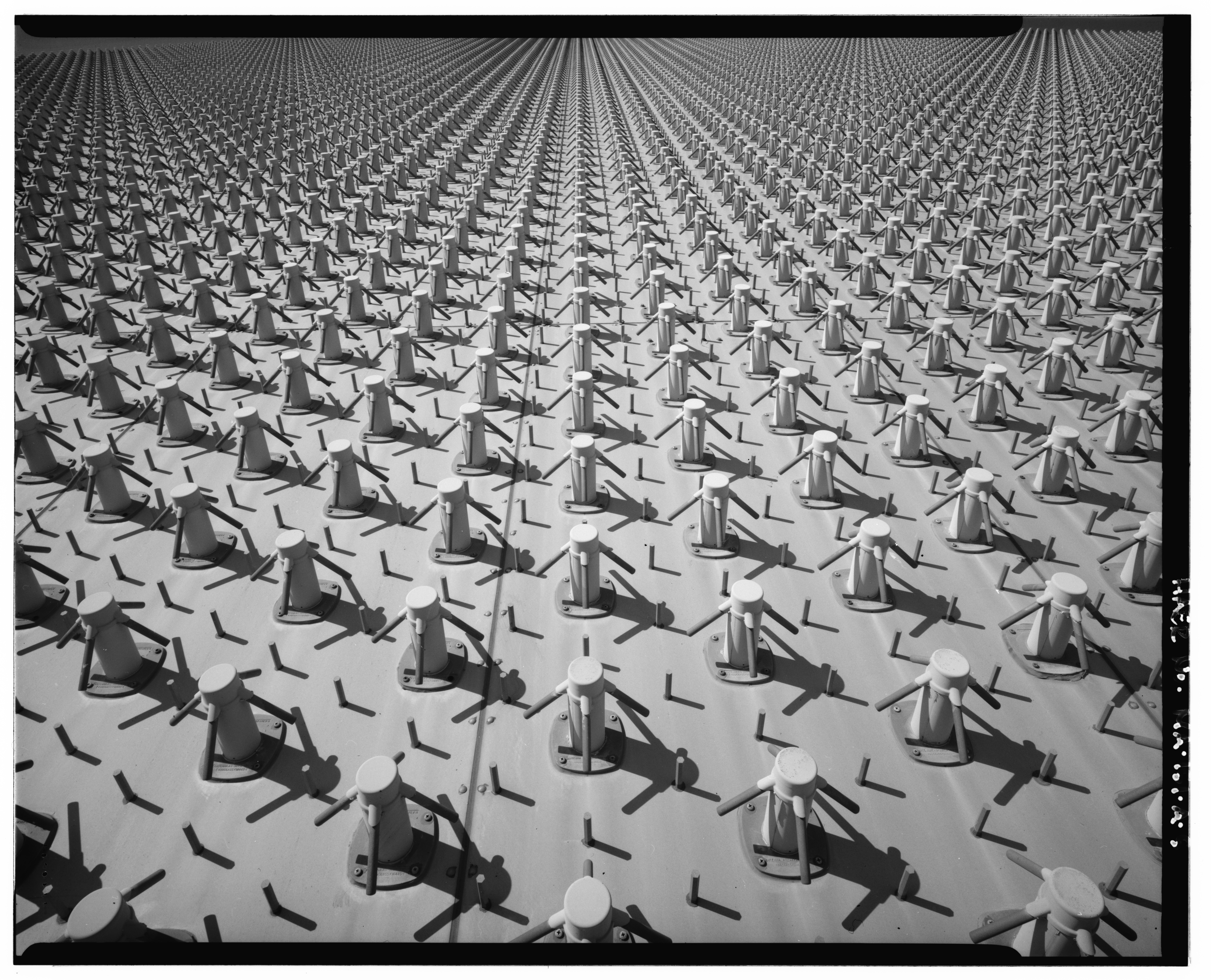
Some of the 2,677 crossed-dipole elements in the phased array antenna

The radar was built in the Cold War to give early warning of a nuclear attack, to allow time for US bombers to get off the ground and land-based US missiles to be launched, to decrease the chance that a preemptive strike could destroy US strategic nuclear forces. The deployment of submarine launched ballistic missiles (SLBMs) by the Soviet Union by the 1970s, significantly decreased the warning time available between the detection of an incoming enemy missile and its reaching its target, because SLBMs can be launched closer to the US than the previous ICBMs, which have a long flight path from the Soviet Union to the continental US. Thus there was a need for a radar system with faster reaction time than existing radars. PAVE PAWS later acquired a second mission of tracking satellites and other objects in Earth orbit as part of the United States Space Surveillance Network.

A notable feature of the system is its phased array antenna technology, it was one of the first large phased array radars. A phased array was used because a conventional mechanically-rotated radar antenna cannot turn fast enough to track multiple ballistic missiles. A nuclear strike on the US would consist of hundreds of ICBMs and SLBMs incoming simultaneously. The beam of the phased array radar is steered electronically without moving the fixed antenna, so it can be pointed in a different direction in milliseconds, allowing it to track many incoming missiles at the same time.

== Description ==
The AN/FPS-115 radar consists of two phased arrays of antenna elements mounted on two sloping sides of the 105 ft high transmitter building, which are oriented 120° apart in azimuth. The beam from each array can be deflected up to 60° from the array's central boresight axis, allowing each array to cover an azimuth angle of 120°, thus the entire radar can cover an azimuth of 240°. The building sides are sloped at an angle of 20°, and the beam can be directed at any elevation angle between 3° and 85°. The beam is kept at least 100 ft above the ground over public-accessible land to avoid the possibility of exposing the public to significant electromagnetic fields.

Each array is a circle 72.5 ft (22.1 m) in diameter consisting of 2,677 crossed dipole antenna elements, of which 1,792 are powered and serve as both transmitting and receiving antennas, with the rest functioning as receiving antennas. Due to the phenomenon of interference the radio waves from the separate elements combine in front of the antenna to form a beam. The array has a gain of 38.6 dB, and the width of the beam is only 2.2°. The drive current for each antenna element passes through a device called a phase shifter, controlled by the central computer. By changing the relative timing (phase) of the current pulses supplied to each antenna element the computer can instantly steer the beam to a different direction.

The radar operates in the UHF band between 420 - 450 MHz, which is shared with the 70 centimeter amateur band (just below the UHF television broadcast band), that is a wavelength of 71–67 cm, with circular polarization. It is an active array (AESA); each of the 1,792 transmitting elements has its own solid-state transmitter/receiver module, and radiates a peak power of 320 W, so the peak power of each array is 580 kW. It operates in a repeating 54 millisecond cycle in which it transmits a series of pulses, then listens for echoes. Its duty cycle (fraction of time spent transmitting) is never greater than 25% (so the average power of the beam never exceeds 25% of 580 kW, or 145 kW) and is usually around 18%. It is reported to have a range of about 3,000 nautical miles (3,500 statute miles, 5,600 km); at that range it can detect an object the size of a small car, and smaller objects at closer ranges.

The functioning of the radar is completely automatic, controlled by four computers. The software divides the beam time between "surveillance" and "tracking" functions, switching the beam back and forth rapidly between different tasks. In the surveillance mode, which normally consumes about 11% of the duty cycle, the radar repeatedly scans the horizon across its full 240° azimuth in a pattern between 3° and 10° elevation, creating a "surveillance fence" to immediately detect missiles as they rise above the horizon into the radar's field of view. In the tracking mode, which normally consumes the other 7% of the 18% duty cycle, the radar beam follows already-detected objects to determine their trajectory, calculating their launch and target points.

== Background ==
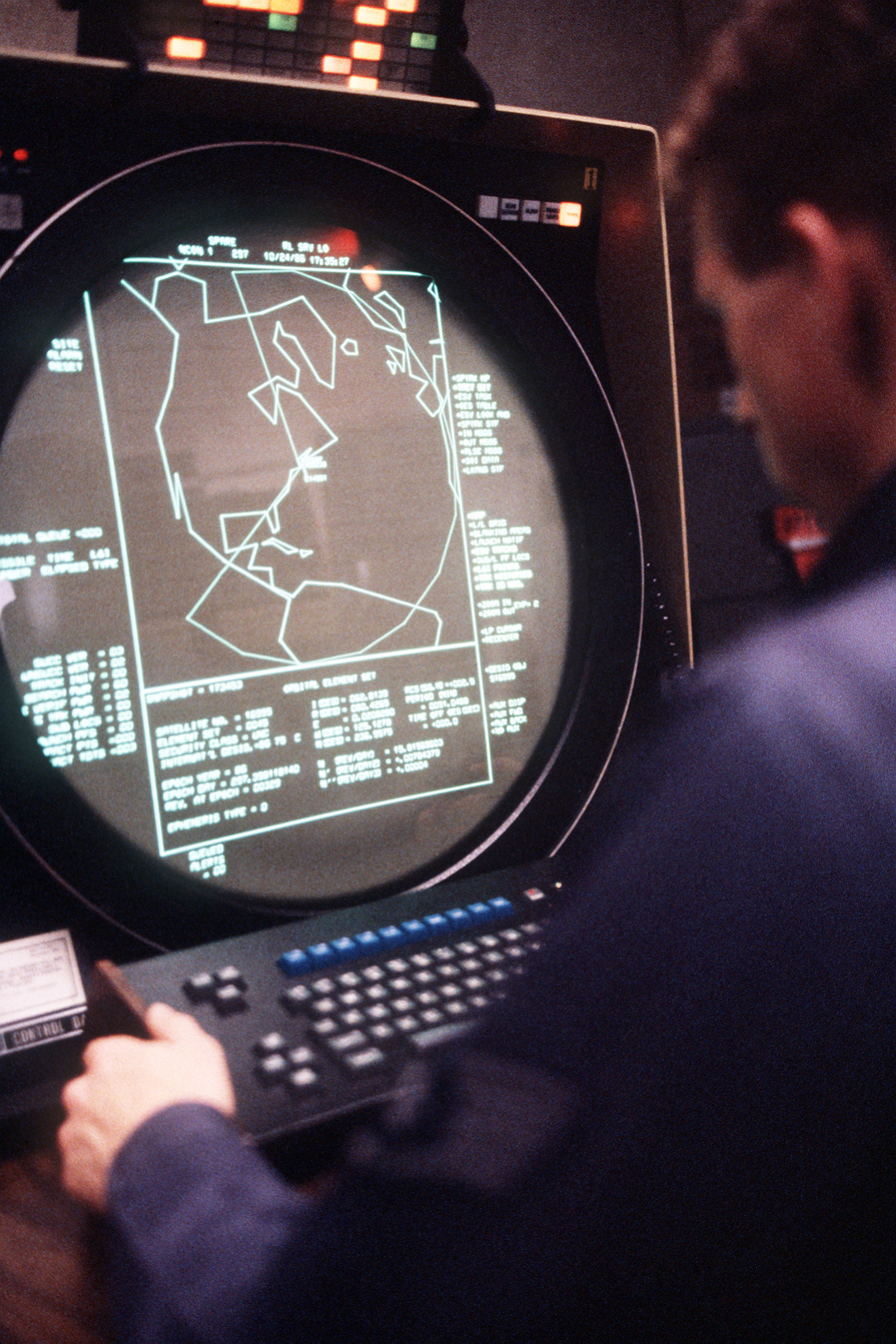
1986 operator and AN/FPS-115 console.

Fixed-reflector radars with mechanically-scanned beams such as the 1955 GE AN/FPS-17 Fixed Ground Radar and 1961 RCA AN/FPS-50 Radar Set were deployed for missile tracking, and the USAF tests of modified AN/FPS-35 mechanical radars at Virginia and Pennsylvania SAGE radar stations had "marginal ability" to detect Cape Canaveral missiles in summer 1962. A Falling Leaves mechanical radar in New Jersey built for BMEWS successfully tracked a missile during the October 1962 Cuban Missile Crisis, and "an AN/FPS-85 long-range phased array (Passive electronically scanned array) radar was constructed at Eglin AFB" Site C-6, Florida beginning on 29 October 1962 (the Bendix Radio Division FPS-85 contract had been signed 2 April 1962). Early military phased array radars were also deployed for testing: Bendix AN/FPS-46 Electronically Steerable Array Radar (ESAR) at Towson, MD (powered up in November 1960), White Sands' Multi-function Array Radar (1963), and the Kwajalein Missile Site Radar (1967).

=== Submarine Launched Ballistic Missile Detection and Warning System ===
The Avco 474N Submarine Launched Ballistic Missile (SLBM) Detection and Warning System (SLBMD&W System) was deployed as "an austere…interim line-of-sight system" after approval in July 1965 to modify some Air Defense Command (ADC) Avco AN/FPS-26 Frequency Diversity Radars into Avco AN/FSS-7 SLBM Detection Radars. The 474N sites planned for 1968 also were to include AN/GSQ-89 data processing equipment (for synthesizing tracks from radar returns), as well as site communications equipment that NORAD requested on 10 May 1965 to allow "dual full period dedicated data circuits" to the Cheyenne Mountain 425L System, which was "fully operational" on 20 April 1966. (Cheyenne Mountain Complex relayed 474N data to "SAC, the National Military Command Center, and the Alternate NMCC over BMEWS circuits", for presentation by Display Information Processors—impact ellipses and "threat summary display" with a count of incoming missiles and "Minutes Until First Impact" countdown).

By December 1965 NORAD decided to use the Project Space Track "phased-array radar at Eglin AFB…for SLBM surveillance on an "on-call" basis" "at the appropriate DEFCON". By June 1966 the refined FPS-85 plan was for it "to have the capability to operate in the SLBM mode simultaneously [sic] [interlaced transmissions] with the Spacetrack surveillance and tracking modes" Rebuilding of the "separate faces for transmitting and receiving" began in 1967 after the under-construction Eglin FPS-85 was "almost totally destroyed by fire on 5 January 1965". FPS-85 IOC was in 1969, 474N interim operations began in July 1970 (474N IOC was 5 May 1972), and in 1972 20% of Eglin FPS-85 "surveillance capability…became dedicated to search for SLBMs," and new SLBM software was installed in 1975. (the FPS-85 was expanded in 1974).

The Stanley R. Mickelsen Safeguard Complex with North Dakota phased arrays (four-face Missile Site Radar and single-face GE Perimeter Acquisition Radar, PAR) became operational in 1975 as part of the Safeguard Program for defending against enemy ballistic missiles.

== Development ==
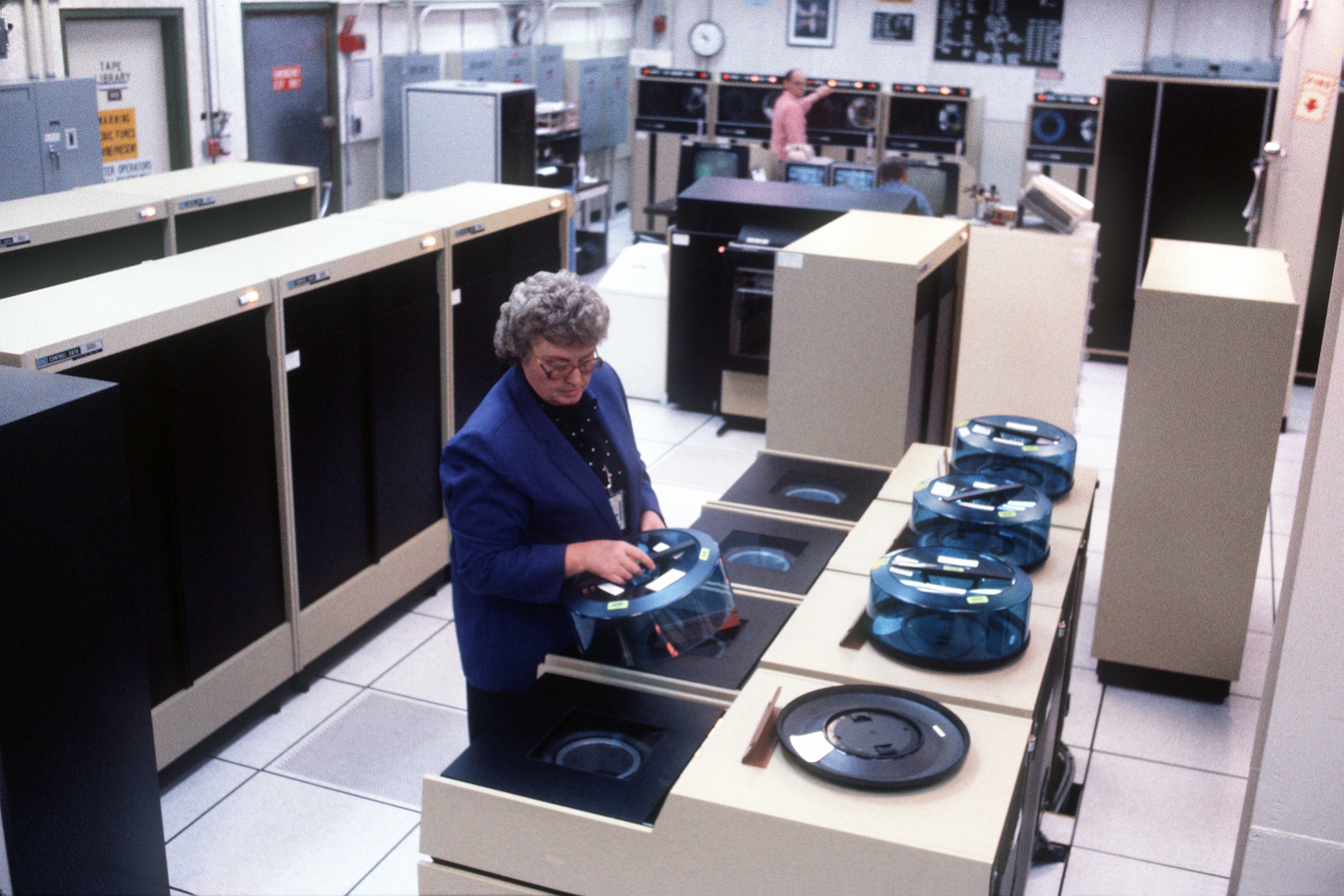
1986 Cape Cod PAVE PAWS computer room with 4 hard disk units (foreground).

The SLBM Phased Array Radar System (SPARS) (Note: PAVE PAWS was one of the earliest large USAF Support Systems not developed with a 3 digit number and an appended letter, such as the preceding 474N SLBM system and the "Big L" systems that included the Burroughs "425L Command/Control and Missile Warning" ("fully operational" at Cheyenne Mountain on 20 April 1966) and the "496L Spacetrack" systems which networked PAVE PAWS.) was the USAF program initiated in November 1972 by the Joint Chiefs of Staff (JCS) while the Army's PAR was under construction. A 1974 SPARS proposal for "two new SLBM Phased Array Warning Radars" was submitted to replace the east/west coast 474N detection radars, which had "limitations against Soviet SLBMs, particularly the longer range SS-N-8" on 1973 "Delta" class submarines. Development began in August 1973, SPARS was renamed (Note: The PAVE identifier used when PAVE PAWS was designated on 18 February 1975 was "a code word for the Air Force unit in charge of the project" and which developed other PAVE systems—"CF" the unit for "the COBRA system" with the Cobra Dane (AN/FPS-108) radar. By 1979, PAVE systems used the term Precision Acquisition Vehicle Entry defined for the identifier, e.g., the 1980 PAVE Pillar and c. 1977 Pave Mover (JSTARS) programs initiated by the USAF. In particular, on 1 October 1999 the Department of the Air Force identified PAVE PAWS as "Precision Acquisition Vehicle Entry Phased Array Warning System", a term publicized as early as 1979.) PAVE PAWS on 18 February 1975, and system production was requested by a 13 June 1975 Request for Proposals (RFP). Rome Air Development Center (RADC) "was responsible for the design, fabrication installation, integration test, and evaluation of" PAVE PAWS through 1980.

The differing USAF AN/FPS-109 Cobra Dane phased array radar in Alaska achieved IOC on 13 July 1977 for "providing intelligence on Soviet test missiles fired at the Kamchatka peninsula from locations in southwestern Russia". The Safeguard PAR station that closed in 1976, had its radar "modified for the ADCOM mission during 1977 [and] ADCOM accepted [the Concrete Missile Early Warning Station] from the Army on 3 October 1977" for "SLBM surveillance of Arctic Ocean areas". By December 1977 RADC had developed the 322 watt PAVE PAWS "solid state transmitter and receiver module", and the System Program Office (ESD/OCL) issued the AN/FPS-115 "System Performance Specification …SS-OCLU-75-1A" on 15 December 1977. IBM's PAVE PAWS "beam-steering and pulse schedules from the CYBER-174" duplexed computers to the MODCOMP IV duplexed radar control computers were "based upon" PARCS program(s) installed for attack characterization in 1977 when the USAF received the Army's PAR. Bell Labs enhanced the PARCS beginning December 1978, e.g., "extending the range" by 1989 for the Enhanced PARCS configuration (EPARCS).

== Environmental and health concerns ==
USAF environmental assessments in August 1975 and March 1976 for PAVE PAWS were followed by the EPA's Environmental Impact Analysis in December 1977. Environmental impacts were litigated in U.S. District Court in Boston. The government asserted the position that PAVE PAWS would protect the American coastline, while hiding the fact that it had no defensive armaments in the event an incoming missile was detected. The USAF requested the National Research Council (in May 1978) and a contractor, SRI International (April 1978), to assess PAVE PAWS radiation. Two NRC reports were prepared (1979, tbd), SRI's Environmental Impact Statement was reviewed during a 22 January 1979 public hearing at the Sandwich MA high school auditorium (~300 people). The studies found no elevated cancer risk from PAVE PAWS e.g., elevated Ewing sarcoma rates were not supported by 2005 available data (a December 2007 MA Department of Health report concluded it "appears unlikely that PAVE PAWS played a primary role in the incidence of Ewing family of tumors on Cape Cod.") A followup to a 1978 Air Force School of Aerospace Medicine report concluded in 2005 that power densities beyond 15 metres (49.2 ft) were within permissible exposure limits. Consistent with other regulations to prevent interference with aircraft systems, the FAA restricts aircraft at altitudes below 4,500 ft (1,400 m) to maintain 1 nm (1.85 km) from the Cape Cod SSPARS phased array.

== Deployment ==
PAVE PAWS and BMEWS coverage

On May 23, 1975 the USAF announced the Raytheon Corporation would be contracted to build the East Coast facility in Otis Air Force Base and West Coast facility in Beale Air Force Base. On October 27, 1976, ground-breaking ceremonies were held at the East Coast Site.

System performance testing at the Otis facility began on April 3, 1978 and completed by January 16, 1979. To mitigate interference at the FPS-115 site on Flatrock Hill from the Cape & Islands Emergency Medical Service (CIEMSS), on 8 February 1979 ESD installed six high pass filters—then Raytheon was contracted 24 May to move the EMS Repeater Station to Bourne, Massachusetts (completed 13 July). After a 5–7 March "final review of the East Coast PAVE PAWS EIS was held at Hq AFSC", the site was accepted by ESD on 12 April. The "first radio frequency transmission" from the West Coast Site was 23 March 1979 (it was completed in October 1979). "ADCOM wanted four [PAVE PAWS] sites, but by the end of 1979 only two had been funded".

The Cape Cod system reached Initial operating capability (IOC) as the Cape Cod Missile Early Warning Station on 4 April 1981 with initial operational test and evaluation (IOT&E) completed 21 May; Beale AFB reached IOC on 15 August. The two PAVE PAWS, three BMEWS, and the PARCS & FPS-85 radar stations transferred to Strategic Air Command (then Space Command) in 1983. By 1981 Cheyenne Mountain was providing 6,700 messages per hour including those based on input from the PAVE PAWS and the remaining FSS-7 stations. In 1981, as part of the Worldwide Military Command and Control System Information System (WIS), the Pentagon's National Military Command Center was receiving data "directly from the Satellite Early Warning System (SEWS) and directly from the PAVE PAWS sensor systems".

Beam Steering Unit (BSU) and Receiver Beam Former (REX) replacements were made on the four Cape Cod and Beale radars in the 1980s.

== Expansion ==
The PAVE PAWS Expansion Program had begun by February 1982 to replace "older FPS-85 and FSS-7 SLBM surveillance radars in Florida with a new PAVE PAWS radar to provide improved surveillance of possible SLBM launch areas southeast of the United States [and for another] to the Southwest." After a 3 June 1983 RFP, Raytheon Company was contracted on 10 November and had a 22–23 February 1984 System Design Review for the Southeast and Southwest radars. The Expansion's Development Test and Engineering testing commenced on 3 February 1986 at the Southeast Site (PAVE PAWS Site 3, Robins Air Force Base—completed 5 June) and 15 August at the Southwest Site (PAVE PAWS Site 4, Eldorado Air Force Station). The Gulf Coast FPS-115s were operational in 1986 (Robins) and May 1987 (Eldorado IOC). In February 1995, all 4 radars were being netted by the "missile warning center at Cheyenne Mountain AS [which was] undergoing a $450 million upgrade program". Other centers receiving PAVE PAWS output were the 19xx Missile Correlation Center and 19xx Space Control Center.

During the post-Cold War draw down, the Eldorado and Robins radar stations closed in 1995. By October 1999, Cape Cod and Beale radars were providing data via Jam Resistant Secure Communication (JRSC) circuits to the Command Center Processing and Display System in the NMCC. The transition of BMEWS and PAVE PAWS to SSPARS had begun with the 4 AN/FPS-50 BMEWS radars near Thule Air Base being replaced with a Raytheon AN/FPS-120 Solid State Phased Array Radar at Thule Site J (operational "2QFY87").

== In foreign service ==
An AN/FPS-115 system was sold to Taiwan in 2000 and installed at Leshan Radar Station on Luchang Mountain, Tai'an, Miaoli in 2006. It was commissioned into service in 2013. The system cost approximately US$1.4 billion and Raytheon was the prime contractor. It provides up to six minutes notice of Chinese ballistic missile attack. The system spends most of its time observing satellites and orbital debris; this information is shared with the United States. In 2016 Raytheon Integrated Defense Systems was awarded a $26.2 million contract to upgrade Taiwan's radar system. This followed on a $289.5 million sustainment contract which Raytheon was awarded in 2012. It has been reported that the defenses of Taiwan's PAVE PAWS system include a land based Phalanx CIWS.

Taiwan had explored the acquisition of a second PAVE PAWS set but in 2012 decided against the purchase as the first PAVE PAWS set was significantly over budget and behind schedule. The second system would have been located in the south and together the PAVE PAWS sets would have provided Taiwan with 360-degree coverage.

The radar site in Taiwan sits on top of a mountain at an elevation of over 2,600 m (8,500 ft). Due to its extremely elevated position the Taiwanese set has the unique ability to track surface ships. Detection and tracking data is believed to be shared with the United States in real time; this has not been officially confirmed.

The radar site was first occupied by a Naval Maritime and Surveillance Command radar surveillance facility, which was relocated to a higher peak in the same region to make way for PAVE PAWS.

In 2013, the U.S. announced a plan to sell an AN/FPS-132 to Qatar. The radar system, completed in the 2020s, sustained damage during the 2026 conflict involving Iran. It is widely regarded by military analysts as a high-value asset primarily designed for the detection and tracking of ballistic missiles, rather than lower-altitude threats such as drones. Recent assessments indicate that its existing protective measures are insufficient, and that additional layers of integrated air and missile defense would be required to enhance its survivability in war.

== Replacement ==
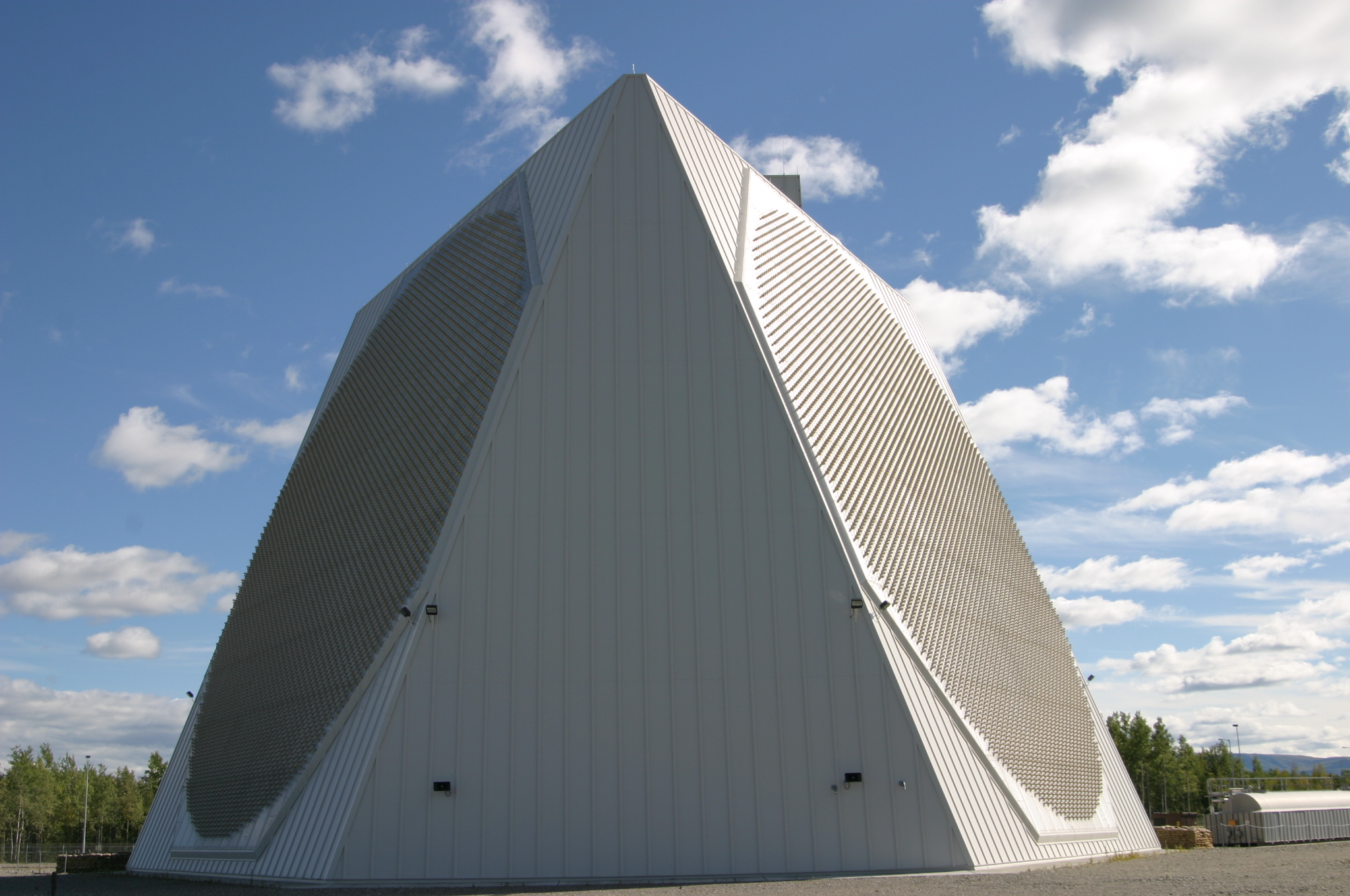
The AN/FPS-120 at Clear SFS, Alaska, was completed in 2001 with portions of the AN/FPS-115 radar from Eldorado AFS that closed in 1995, e.g., both "transmitter/receiver arrays", as well as some "cabinets and computers" – saving $140 million (the deployment cost $106 million).

The Solid State Phased Array Radar System (SSPARS) began replacing PAVE PAWS when the first AN/FPS-115 face was taken off-line for the radar upgrade. New Raytheon AN/FPS-123 Early Warning Radars became operational in 19xx (Beale) and 19xx (Cape Cod) in each base's existing PAVE PAWS "Scanner Building". RAF Fylingdales, UK, and Clear Space Force Station, Alaska BMEWS stations became SSPARS radar stations when their respective AN/FPS-126 radar (3 faces) and 2001 Raytheon AN/FPS-120 Solid State Phased Array Radar became operational. In 2007, 100 owners/trustees of amateur radio repeaters in the 420 to 450 MHz band near AN/FPS-123 radars were notified to lower their power output to mitigate interference, and AN/FPS-123s were part of the Air Force Space Surveillance System by 2009. The Beale AN/FPS-123 was upgraded to a Raytheon AN/FPS-132 Upgraded Early Warning Radar (UEWR), circa 2012, with capabilities to operate in the Ground-based Midcourse Defense (GMD) ABM system—the Beale UEWR included Avionics, Transmit-Receive modules, Receiver Exciter / Test Target Generator, Beam Steering Generator, Signal Processor, and other changes. After additional UEWR installations for GMD at Thule Site J and the UK (contracted 2003), a 2012 ESD/XRX Request for Information for replacement, and remote operation, of the remaining "PAVE PAWS/BMEWS/PARCS systems" at Cape Cod, Alaska, and North Dakota was issued. The Alaska AN/FPS-132 was contracted in fall 2012.

== See also ==
- Dunay radar, a UHF radar with a similar function and era of development.
- Voronezh radar, the latest post Soviet-era Russian equivalent.
- J/FPS-5
- List of radars
- List of military electronics of the United States
