= White Sands Missile Range =

Military testing area in New Mexico, US

White Sands Missile Range (1960) New Mexico Joint Guided Missile Test Range (1947) White Sands Proving Ground (1945) Alamogordo Bombing and Gunnery Range (1941)
- Part of United States Army Test and Evaluation Command
- Located in the San Andres Mountains, the Oscura Mountains, the San Augustin Mountains, the Tularosa Basin, and the Chupadera Mesa in New Mexico
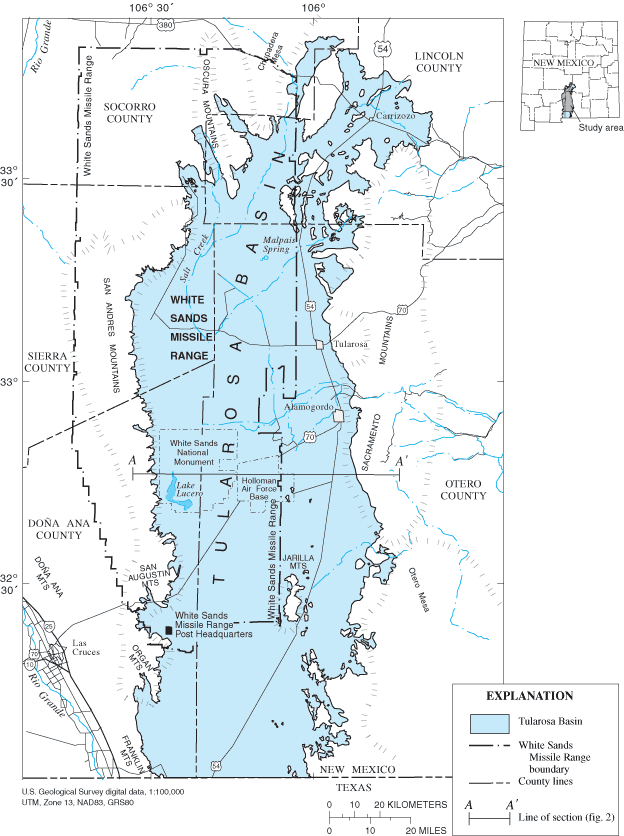
- Most of the northern Tularosa Basin (blue) is used for the WSMR (area within dashed perimeter), which encloses numerous areas that are not military land (e.g., the NPS's White Sands National Park), as well as United States Air Force facilities.

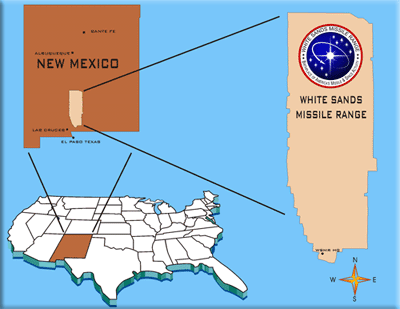
- WSMR location

Site information
- Controlled by: United States Army
- Website: home.army.mil/wsmr/

Location
- Coordinates: 32°20′08″N 106°24′21″W Condron Army Airfield near the southernmost WSMR point

Site history
- Built: 1948-07-09 cantonment completed 1957-02: Launch Complex 37 completed
- Built by: Ordnance Corps

Garrison information
- Current commander: COL Andrew R. Morgan (2025–present)
- Past commanders: BG David C. Trybula (2019–2021); BG Gregory J. Brady (2018–2019); BG Eric L. Sanchez (2016–2018); BG Timothy R. Coffin (2014–2016); MG Gwen Bingham (2012–2014); BG John G. Ferrari (2011–2012); BG David L. Mann (2008–2009); BG Richard L. McCabe (2007–2008)

White Sands Missile Range (WSMR) is a United States Army military testing area and firing range located in the US state of New Mexico. The range was originally established in 1941 as the Alamogordo Bombing and Gunnery Range, where the Trinity test site lay at the northern end of the Range, in Socorro County near the towns of Carrizozo and San Antonio. It then became the White Sands Proving Ground on 9 July 1945.

White Sands National Park founded in the 1930s is located within the range.

== Significant events ==
- The missile range was originally established in 1941 as the Alamogordo Bombing and Gunnery Range.
- On 16 July 1945, the first atomic bomb (code named Trinity) was test detonated at Trinity Site near the northern boundary of the range, seven days after the White Sands Proving Ground was officially established, near the towns of Carrizozo and San Antonio. (33°40.636′N 106°28.525′W).
- After the conclusion of World War II, 100 long-range German V-2 rockets that were captured by U.S. military troops were brought to WSMR. Of these, 67 were test-fired between 1946 and 1951 from the White Sands V-2 Launching Site. (This was followed by the testing of American rockets, which continues to this day, along with testing other technologies.)
- On 15 May 1947, a V-2 rocket fired from WSMR veered off course and landed 4 miles (6.4 km) northeast of Alamogordo, New Mexico.
- Exactly two weeks later, on May 29, 1947, a modified V-2 sounding rocket veered off course and crashed on top of a rocky knoll about 3.5 miles (5.6 km) south of the Juárez business district, leaving a 24 feet (7.3 m) deep by 50 feet (15 m) wide crater.
- On 11 July 1970, the United States Air Force launched an Athena sounding rocket, equipped with re-entry vehicle V-123-D, from the Green River Launch Complex in Utah. While its intended target was inside of WSMR, the rocket instead flew south and impacted 180–200 miles (290–320 km) south of the Mexican border in the Mapimi Desert in the northeastern corner of the Mexican state of Durango.
- On 30 March 1982 NASA's Space Shuttle Columbia landed on the Northrop Strip at WSMR as the conclusion to mission STS-3. This was the only time that NASA used WSMR as a landing site for the space shuttle.

Trinity explosion at the White Sands Missile Range.

== Geography ==
As the largest military installation in the United States, WSMR encompasses almost 3,200 sq mi (8,300 km^{2}) including parts of Doña Ana, Otero, Socorro, Sierra, and Lincoln counties in southern New Mexico.

=== Nearby military bases ===
Holloman Air Force Base borders WSMR to the east; and WSMR borders the 600,000-acre (2,400 km^{2}) McGregor Range Complex at Fort Bliss to the south (southeast Tularosa Basin and on Otero Mesa) making them contiguous areas for military testing.

=== Nearby cities ===
WSMR is located between Las Cruces, New Mexico to the west, Alamogordo, New Mexico 40 miles to the east, and Chaparral, New Mexico and El Paso, Texas to the south.

=== National park and wildlife refuge ===
White Sands National Park and the San Andres National Wildlife Refuge are federally-protected natural areas contained within the borders of WSMR.

== Transportation ==
=== Major highways ===
New Mexico State Road 213 enters the range from the south from Chaparral, New Mexico and terminates at U.S. Highway 70, which traverses the southern part of the range in a west-northeast direction and is subject to periodic road closures during test firings at the range. U.S. Highway 380 runs east–west along the northern edge of WSMR between San Antonio and Carrizozo, and is also subject to periodic closures during test firings. New Mexico State Road 525 provides access from U.S. Highway 380 to the north end of WSMR near Stallion Army Airfield.

=== Nearby airports ===
El Paso International Airport is the nearest airport with regularly scheduled commercial flights. There have been no regularly scheduled commercial passenger flights from Las Cruces International Airport since 25 July 2005, when Westward Airways ceased operations; general aviation, New Mexico Army National Guard (4 UH-72 Lakota Helicopters), private charters and CAP, among others, still use the airport. Regularly scheduled commercial flights are also available at the Albuquerque International Sunport, which is located 200 miles (320 km) north of White Sands Missile Range's main base, but is closer to the northern test ranges than El Paso.

== National Historic Landmarks ==
On 21 December 1965, the Trinity Site, selected in November 1944 for the Trinity nuclear test conducted on 16 July 1945, was designated a National Historic Landmark district, and added to the National Register of Historic Places on 15 October 1966.

The White Sands V-2 Launching Site used for a V-2 static test firing on 15 March 1946, and for the first US V-2 launch on 16 April 1946, received landmark designation on 3 October 1985.

== Current operations ==
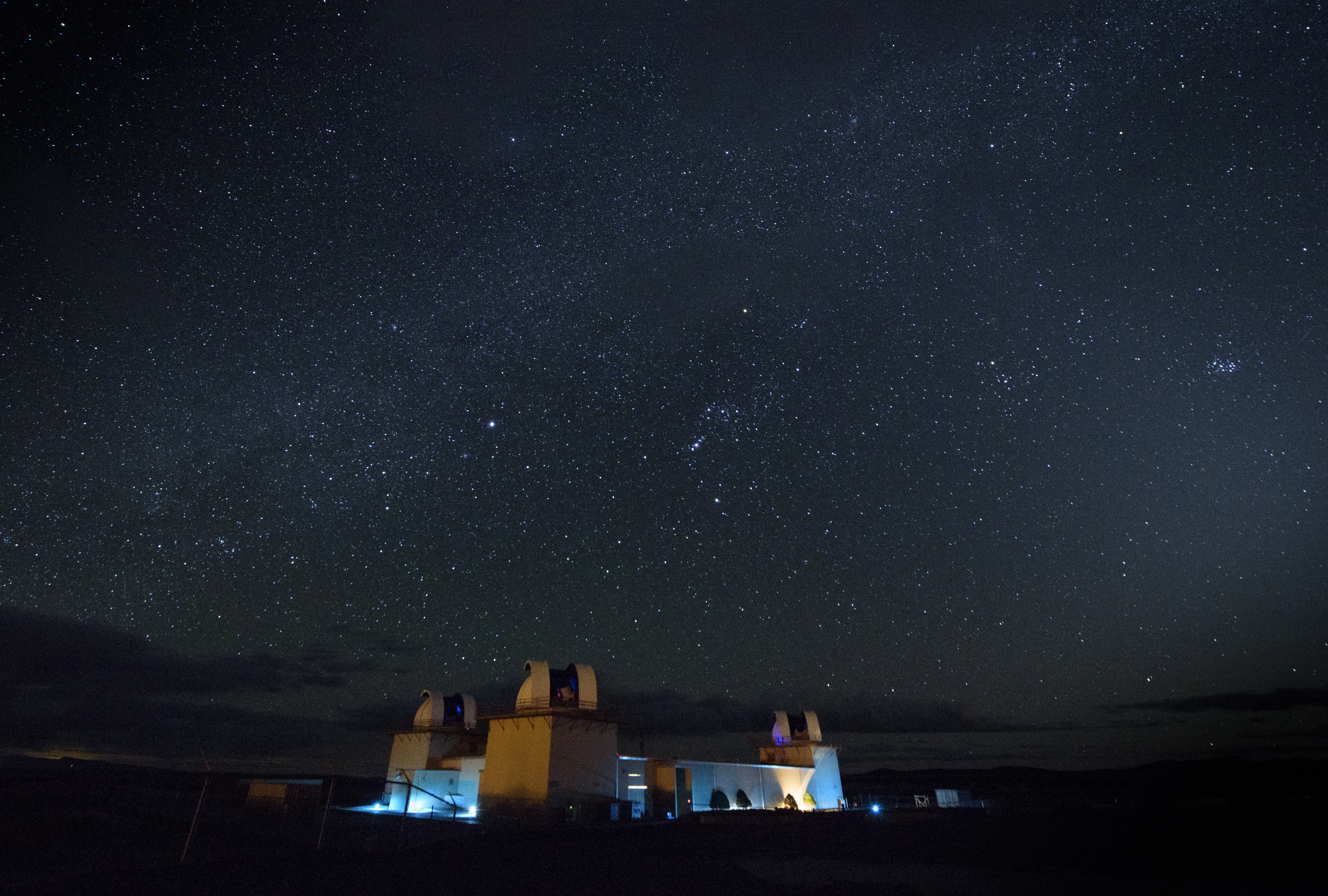
Ground-based electro-optical deep-space surveillance telescopes performing space surveillance mission.

The WSMR has branches for tactical systems and electromagnetic radiation, and conducts missile testing and range recovery operations. "WSMR Main Post" includes several smaller areas such as the housing area, golf course, "Navy Area", and "Technical Area" The WSMR Museum offers tours and exhibits including a V-2 rocket returned in May 2004 after restoration. The White Sands Missile Range Hall of Fame inducts members such as the first range commander, Colonel Harold Turner (1945–1947), in 1980. A recreational shooting range just inside the "El Paso gate" on the south is outside of the Post Area.

The 1972 DoD Centers for Countermeasures (CCM) evaluates precision guided munitions and other devices in electronic counter- and counter-countermeasures environments. Other operations on WSMR land include the Launch Abort Flight Test Complex for the Pad Abort-1, the White Sands Launch Complex 37 built for Nike Hercules tests, the White Sands Launch Complex 38 built for Nike Zeus tests with Launch Control Building now used for Patriot missile firings, the North Oscura Peak facility of the Air Force Research Laboratory Directed Energy Directorate, and the 1963 NASA White Sands Test Facility's ground station for Tracking and Data Relay Satellites, and the SDO ground station with two 18 m (59 ft) antennas.

== Chronology ==
- 1930: Robert Goddard began rocket testing in New Mexico.
- 1941-04-13: US World War II preparations established the Army Air Base, Alamogordo
- 1942: Biggs Army Airfield construction began near El Paso (1947 Biggs AFB, 1973 Biggs AAF)--the region's nearby Deming Army Air Field, Ft Sumner Army Air Field, and South Aux Fid #1 transferred to "Army Div Engrs" in 1946.
- 1940s: When the range was formed, ranchers' land was leased and eventually condemned by eminent domain
- In the 1970s, more land was taken permanently to expand the area available for testing.

=== USAAF ranges ===
- 1941-12: Alamogordo Bombing and Gunnery Range established near the "West Texas Bombardier Triangle".
- 1941-12: Executive Order No. 9029 canceled grazing leases on the newly established Alamogordo Bombing and Gunnery Range.
- 1942-07: Goddard's rocket research group moved from Roswell, New Mexico, to Annapolis, Maryland.
- 1944-02: War Department and the Corps of Engineers' Ordnance Department teams looked for a US missile test site.
- 1945-07-13: McDonald Ranch House, Manhattan Project location for the final assembly of the prototype Fat Man plutonium bomb.
- 1945-07-16: Trinity test of the plutonium bomb, the first nuclear weapon tested in the world.

=== White Sands Proving Ground ===
V-2 Rocket Assembling and Launching (1947) de-classified information film reel detailing manufacture and testing of V-2 rockets at the White Sands Missile Range.

- 1945-02-20: The Secretary of War approved establishment of WSPG.
- 1945-04-01: The first Private F launch was at WSPG. (Not Fort Bliss's Antiaircraft and Guided Missile Center, which was established 6 July 1946.)
- 1945-06-25: WSPG construction began with drilling of water wells.
- 1945-07: First of 300 railroad cars of German V-2 components began to arrive at Las Cruces, New Mexico.
- 1945-09: The blockhouse at Army Launch Area 1 (later Launch Complex 33) was completed.
- 1945-09-16: First WAC Corporal test firing.
- 1945-11: GE contractors began to identify, sort, and reassemble V-2 components in Building 1538 (Assembly Building 1).
- 1946: 35 of the Operation Paperclip scientists from Germany were working at WSPG.
- 1946-05-29: The 4th U.S. V-2 launch was tracked by two White Sands based AN/MPQ-2 stations.
- 1946 summer: New WSPG quarters were completed and the Medical Detachment and 3 batteries moved from Ft Bliss.
- 1946-09: First static firing of a Nike missile was at WSPG.

=== New Mexico Joint Guided Missile Test Range ===
- 1947 (late): AMC shifted Army Air Force guided missile programs to Alamogordo in March 1947 and established inter-service New Mexico Joint Guided Missile Test Range at the end of the year
- 1947-11-14: The USAF's Alamogordo Guided Missile Test Base (AGMTB) had its first ramjet-configured GAPA missile launch (39th for GAPA).
- 1948–05-13 to 1949-04-21: First six flight attempts for the Project Bumper two-stage V-2 SRBM/WAC Corporal two-stage research vehicles as the world's first "high-speed" multistage rockets to be launched.
- 1948-07: USAF Project MX–774 commenced with the first RTV-A-2 Hiroc launch (from Launch Complex 33)
- 1949-03: Holloman's 2754th Air Force Base unit gained "control of [the WSPG] support airfield, Condron Field…from Biggs Army Air Field at Fort Bliss."
- 1949: German scientists transferred from New Mexico to Alabama (Ernst Steinhoff transferred from WSPG to Holloman's Air Development Center.)
- 1949-07: The range's Four Bits Peak Instrumentation Annex was assigned to the air force base (disposed on 30 September 1960).

The Pershing Joins the Ranks (1964) Official Department of Defense promotional film reel of the MGM-31 Pershing army missile, at the White Sands range.

- 1951-07: The AGMTB became a sub-base of Florida's Air Force Missile Test Center until 31 August 1952.
- 1951-08-22: Broomstick Scientists in a unit of the 9393 Technical Service Unit conducted their first launch: the "TF-1" V-2 rocket. (Broomstick Sweepings publication ended after a 22 January 1952 general order transferred "1st Ord. GMS Bn." soldiers to Detachment No. 1, Station Complement.)
- 1952-05-27: An aggregated 2,394,384 acres (4,680 sq miles) was set aside for the "Alamogordo bombing range, White Sands proving ground, and the Fort Bliss antiaircraft range".
- 1952-09-01: Merger of Holloman bombing range and smaller White Sands Proving Grounds (WSPG) into WSPG
- 1952-11: The range's Red Butte Instrumentation Annex was assigned to Holloman AFB (disposed on 22 November 1963).
- 1953-06: USS Desert Ship (LLS-1) (Launch Complex 35) was built to test the Navy RIM-8 Talos missile.
- 1957-02: The 9393rd Technical Unit, Ordnance, became the U.S. Army Garrison.
- 1957-03-13: Nike Hercules satisfactory launch from White Sands

=== White Sands Missile Range ===
External media

Images
- 1945 WSPG

Video
- 196x Big Picture: Tularosa Frontier
- Short Notice Annual Practice (minute 16:50)
- Countdown at White Sands

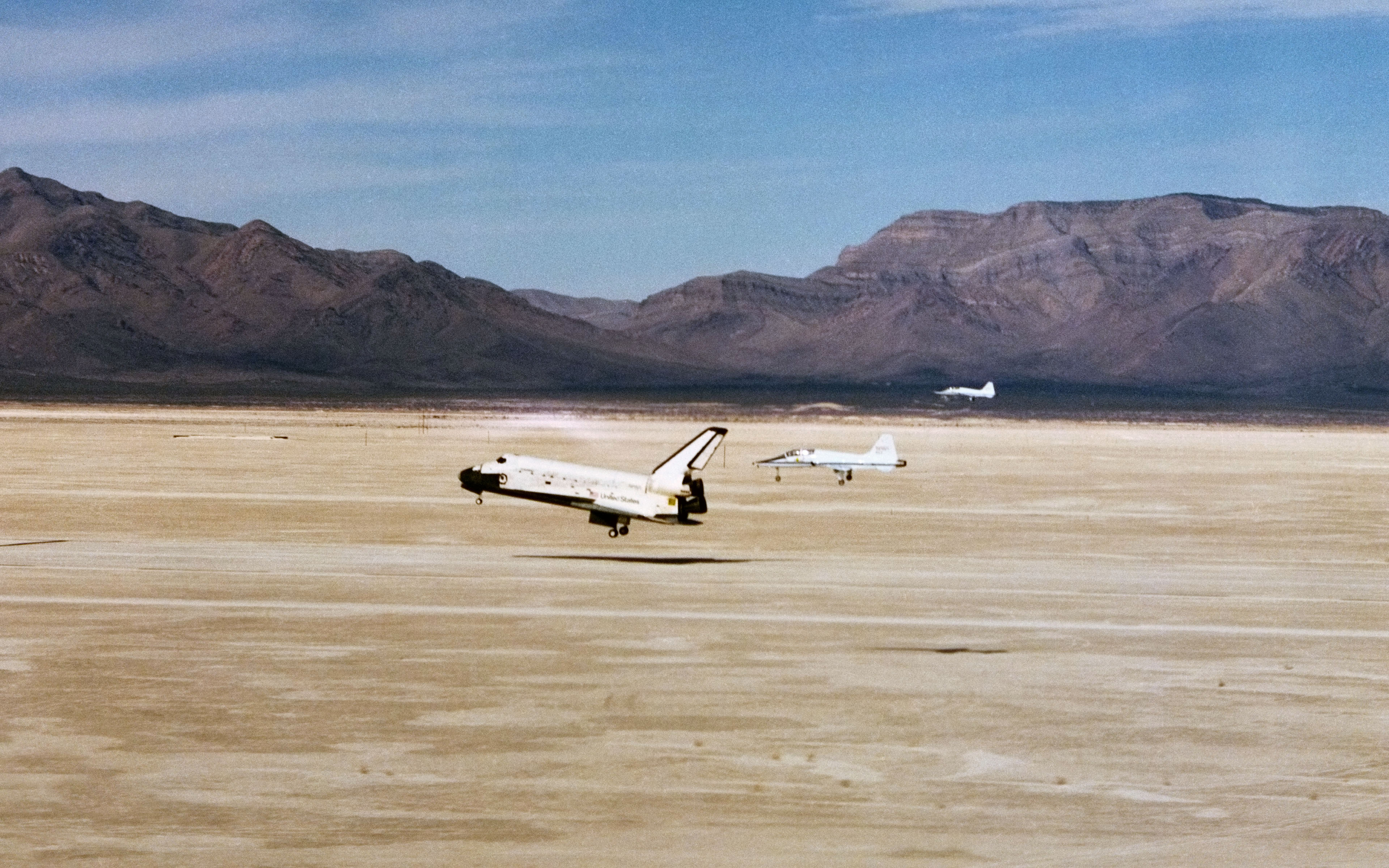
1982 Space Shuttle Columbia landing at Northrop Strip

- 1958-05-01: The test range was designated "White Sands Missile Range".
- 1958-09-02: The Gold Hill Instrumentation Annex was assigned to Holloman Air Force Base (disposed on 30 September 1960).
- 1958-10: Zeus Acquisition Radar site construction at the planned Launch Complex 38 began near an airstrip.
- c. 1959: The long-range GE AN/FPS-17 Fixed Ground Radar at the Laredo Test Site tracked its first WSMR rocket.
- 1959: Shavetail rocket tested.
- 1959: An Iconorama large screen display as used for Pentagon C^{2} was installed at WSMR.
- 1962-03: Annual Service Practice was being conducted for Redstone missile crews.
- 1963-03: Site preparation began for the Multi-function Array Radar.
- 1963-06-05: President John F. Kennedy visited for the MEWS (Missile Exercise White Sands).
- 1963-08-28: Apollo program Launch Escape System tests with the Little Joe II began at White Sands Launch Complex 36 (ended 1966).
- 1963-11: The Loma (assigned December 1952), Rose Park (5 February 1950), and Twin Buttes (December 1949) instrumentation annexes transferred from Holloman Air Force Base to the Army.
- 1963-11: Cincinnati Ohio area civic leaders visit White Sands Nike Zeus site as part of Operation Understanding
- 1964-07-08: The first "successful Athena/ABRES test missile [was] fired from Utah into WSMR".
- 1965-11: first Sprint missile launch
- 1967-10-21: Public Law 90-110 authorized $4,781,000 for WSMR construction.
- 1972: WSMR had 3 RCA AN/FPS-16 Instrumentation Radars
- 1983 thru 30 September 1993 - WSMR hosted the Simtel collection, the largest collection of free software and freeware available to the public on the ARPANET and Internet. It began as a copy of an MIT collection of CP/M software, and expanded to collect free software for other operating systems as well.
- 1991 (late): Convair QF-106 Delta Dart drones based at Holloman Air Force Base began operating as Full-Scale Aerial Targets over WSMR.
- 1993-08-18: The first McDonnell Douglas DC-X flight was from the White Sands Space Harbor
- 2005: AIAA named the WSPG a Historic Aerospace Site.
- 2007-11-14: Launch Complex 32 groundbreaking for the Orion Abort Test Booster.
- 2010-05-06: Successful test of Orion Pad Abort System at Launch Complex 32
- 2011-12-11: Sgt. Colon Marquez was there.
- 2022-05-25: CST-100 Starliner spacecraft, traveling from the International Space Station, landed successfully at White Sands Space Harbor toward the northern portion of White Sands Missile Range

== Launch Complexes ==
- White Sands LC32 - Used for Storm-2 and Hera.
- White Sands LC33 - Originally Army Launch Area 1. Used to launch WAC Corporal, Viking, V-2, Nike, Javelin, Hermes, Corporal, Atlas and Apache.
- White Sands LC35 - Used to launch Standard-ER, Black Brant and Aerobee.
- White Sands LC36 - Originally Army Launch Area 3, later becoming a NASA facility. Used to launch Terrier, Redstone, Nike, Little Joe II, Honest John, Black Brant, Storm, Aries, and to test the Apollo LES.
- White Sands LC37 - Originally Army Launch Area 3. Used for Nike Ajax, Nike Hercules, HIBEX and HEDI KITE.
- White Sands LC38 - Originally Army Launch Area 5. Used for Nike Zeus and Patriot.
- White Sands LC39
- White Sands LC50 - Used for Sprint and HIBEX.
- White Sands LC94 - Used to launch Nike Zeus and Hera.
- White Sands SULF (Speedball Uprange Launch Facility) - Used for Storm.
- White Sands WSSH (White Sands Space Harbor)

== Education ==
Las Cruces Public Schools operates White Sands School on the missile range property.

== See also ==
- Fallout from the Trinity nuclear test
- McDonald Ranch House, location of the final assembly of the world's first nuclear weapon
- Kapustin Yar, the Soviet analog of WSMR
- Peenemunde Army Research Center, WWII German rocket center
- Jornada del Muerto, desert where White Sands Missile Range is located
