= Eldorado Air Force Station =

Military installation

Eldorado Air Force Station
- Part of Air Force Space Command (AFSPC)
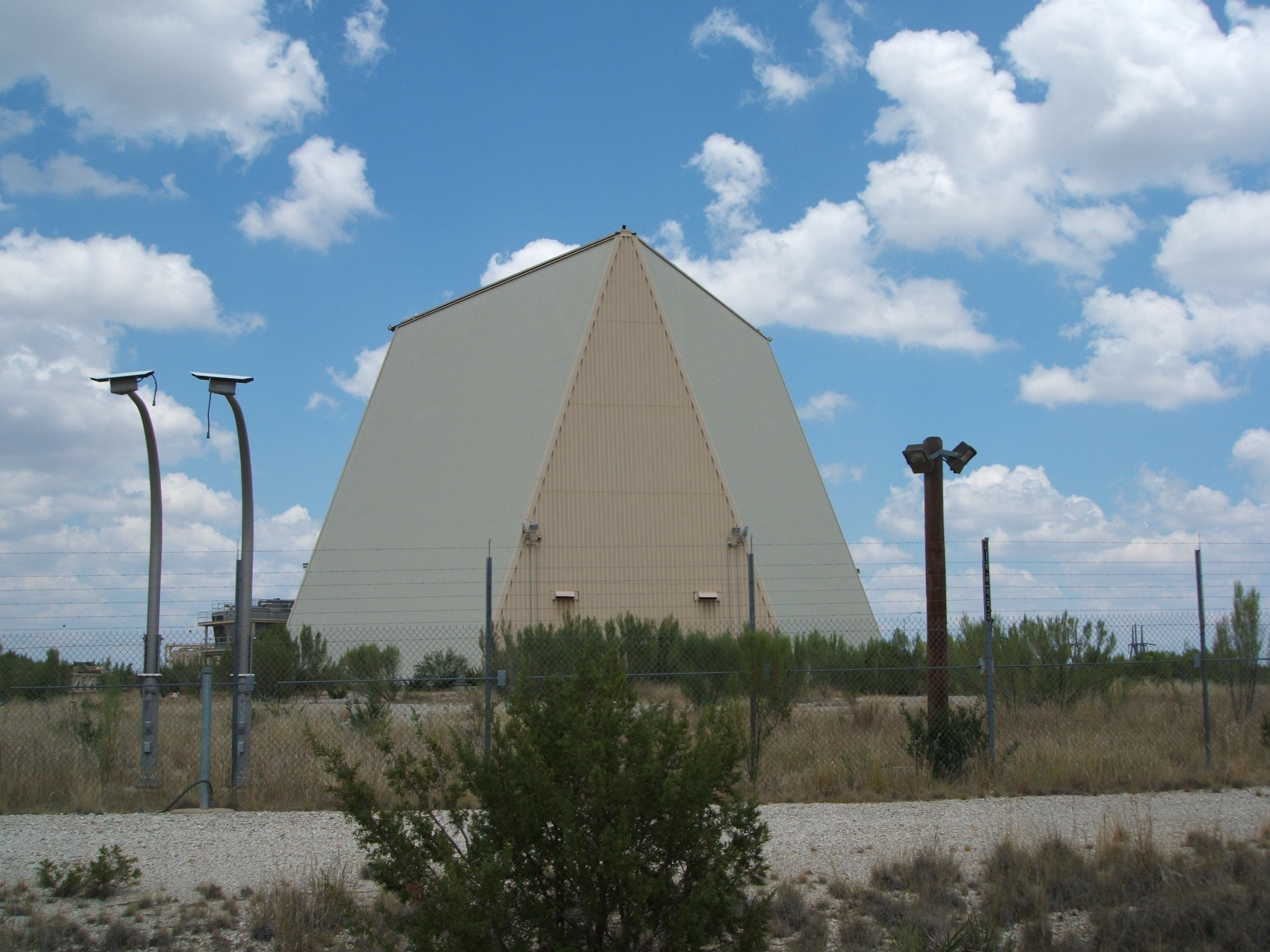
- Former PAVE PAWS array at Eldorado AFS

Site information
- Type: Air Force Station
- Controlled by: United States Air Force
- Condition: Cold Standby

Location
- Coordinates: 30°58′44.68″N 100°33′9.59″W

Site history
- In use: 1987 - 1995

Garrison information
- Garrison: 8th Missile Warning Squadron

Eldorado Air Force Station located 35 miles (56 km) south of San Angelo, Texas was one of the four unique AN/FPS-115 PAVE PAWS, early-warning phased-array radar systems. The 8th Space Warning Squadron, 21st Space Wing, Air Force Space Command operated at Eldorado Air Force Station.

The Station was associated with Goodfellow Air Force Base, 35 miles (56 km) north, and was part of the NORAD at the Cheyenne Mountain Complex command structure.

== History ==
Construction of Eldorado Air Force Station began shortly after site selection for the four PAVE PAWS arrays was completed in 1983, with the station achieving its Initial Operational Capacity (IOC) in May 1986 and becoming fully operational in 1987.

As the likelihood of sea-based missile attacks from the Gulf of Mexico decreased, and with the low probability of missile attacks from the South, the United States Air Force decided to close the southern-facing PAVE PAWS sites at Robins Air Force Base and Eldorado, Texas. After closure in 1995 one radar face from Eldorado AFS, along with another from the closed Robins Air Force Base site were moved to Clear Air Force Station, Alaska as part of the BMEWS upgrade in 1998.

== Units Stationed ==
- 8th Missile Warning Squadron (1987-1995)

== Current status ==
As of 2006 the station was in mothballs awaiting possible future re-activation.
