= Luchang Mountain =

Mountain in Taiwan

Coordinates: 24°29′49″N 121°04′15″E

Luchang Mountain (Chinese: 鹿場大山) or Leshan (Chinese: 樂山), located at the border of Donghe Village in Nanzhuang Township, Miaoli County, and Meiyuan Village in Tai'an Township, Taiwan, is a peak near the border of Wufeng Township in Hsinchu County. The summit stands at an elevation of 2,618 meters, making it the highest peak in the Jialishan Range. It is also a prominent peak on the boundary of Shei-Pa National Park. On the mountain, there is a military facility, Leshan Radar Station, which is a military restricted area with a radar station.
