= White Sands Launch Complex 38 =

Missile testing facility

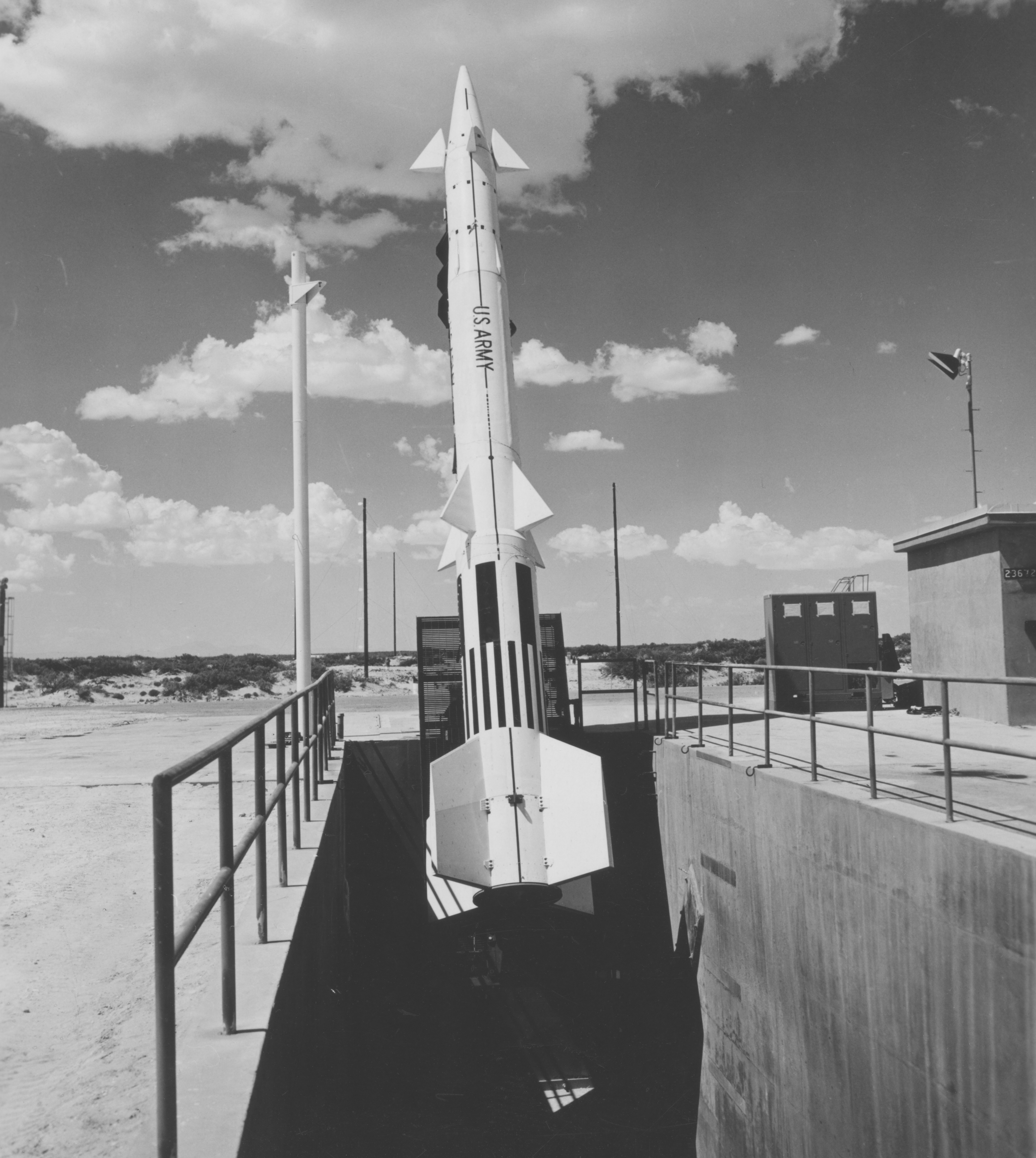
Nike Zeus for ZW-9 launch at WSMR on August 10, 1960

Launch Complex 38 (originally "Army Launch Area Five") was the White Sands Missile Range facility for testing the Nike Zeus anti-ballistic missile. The site is located east of the WSMR Post Area.

== Background ==
In February 1957, the prototype Nike Hercules installation was completed at White Sands Launch Complex 37, and a satisfactory flight test was conducted on March 13 (92 Hercules firings through November 13, 1957--Operation Understanding civilian tours were conducted in 1967.) The 1956 Nike II anti-ballistic missile study for an advance Project Nike evolved into the development program for the Nike Zeus ABM and in January 1961, "ARGMA submitted the “NIKE-ZEUS Defense Production Plan” to the Chief of Ordnance". Ascension Island's Target Tracking Radar was checked out on January 16, 1961, and used to create recordings of radar reception from Cape Canaveral warheads, "chunks of the booster rocket", and "nose cone decoys" during reentry for use as simulated "ghost" missile input during WSMR's Zeus "synthetic intercept" program."

== ZAR compound ==
Deployment of the Zeus Acquisition Radar (ZAR) at the planned Launch Complex began in October 1958 near an airstrip. The LC-18's rectangular compound for the ZAR buildings at 32°24′28.5″N 106°15′25.0″W was begun between AMTC and Oro Grande. The ZAR power building housed "nine 1,500kW generators", and ZAR initial operation was in June/July 1961. The HAPDAR (HArd Point Demonstration Array Radar) construction began 16 July 1965 in the former ZAR Receiver building.

== Launching facilities ==
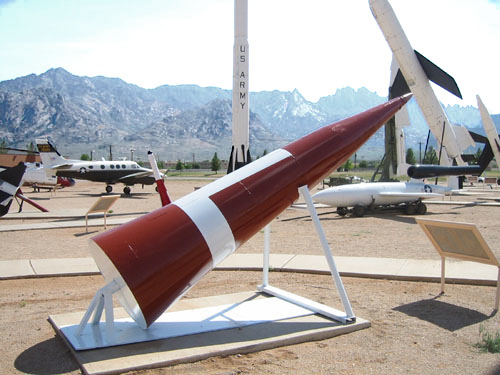
HIBEX rocket

The Nike Zeus prototype launching facilities in the design by the Burns and Roe Company was begun in 1959 and completed in October 1962. LC-18 had a Battery Control Building ("contained two Missile Track Radars, the Target Intercept Computer, and data communication equipment"), a Launch Control Building (LCB, now used for the Patriot missile), Launch Cell, tunnel, and nearby tracking radar. WSMR also had Zeus storage bunkers with sloped ends. The first launch from the LC-38 "R & D underground emplacement" was on April 28, 1960, and the last WSMR Zeus launch was the 72nd "firing" in December 1963 after 18 failures.

== Aftermath ==
External image
- [ Zeus launch from LC-18]

The Zeus "Discrimination Radar (DR) and Target Tracking Radar (TTR) were used as part of a re-entry signature studies program"--"the first successful Athena test missile fired from Utah into WSMR" was in June 1964. White Sands was also the site of the AMRAD—ARPA Measurements Radar—built 1961-3 for assessing reentry of the Special Test Vehicle of Athena/ABRES firings. In 1965, seven HIBEX missiles were tested at WSMR, and the first Sprint missile launch was at WSMR in November 1965.

Bell Telephone Laboratories started the Multi-function Array Radar (MAR-I) construction at WSMR for Nike-X in March 1963. MAR-1 was based on the ZAR, and was the basis for the Kwajalein Missile Site Radar. in September 1968. In February 1974 the last "operational NIKE-ZEUS facility, Target Track Radar-4, ceased operations" and during the war on terror, the tunnel complex was used for simulating a Taliban combat area.
