= Falling Leaves (radar network) =

Improvised ballistic missile early warning system during the 1962 Cuban Missile Crisis

Falling Leaves was an improvised ballistic missile early warning system of the United States Air Force. It was set up during the 1962 Cuban Missile Crisis, and networked 3 existing U.S. radars—2 Space Detection and Tracking System (SPADATS) radars and an Aircraft Control and Warning general surveillance radar which was modified by Sperry Corporation to 1,500 mi (1,300 nmi; 2,400 km) range, allowing detection in space near Cuba. The designation was assigned by the 9th Aerospace Defense Division, headquartered at Ent AFB, Colorado.

Soviet R-12 Dvina IRBMs arrived in Cuba on 8 September 1962. U.S. intelligence sources in Cuba then reported lengthy missiles transported through towns, and three R-12 sites were subsequently photographed by Lockheed U-2s by 19 October. Afterwards, the Cuban Missile Early Warning System (CMEWS) radars were "realigned" to monitor for nuclear missile launches from the new Soviet launch sites.

The Falling Leaves system used the following:

- RCA AN/FPS-49 radar prototype of 1961, being developed at Major Defense Systems Division in New Jersey for the under-construction BMEWS Site III at RAF Fylingdales in Yorkshire, England. Site III was intended to have 3 of the tracking radars. The prototype was "withdrawn from SPADATS and realigned to provide missile surveillance over Cuba" on 24 October.
- AN/FPS-78 at Laredo Air Force Station in Texas, to which was added "real time radar display equipment" from an Alaska radar station. (realigned 26 October)
- Sperry AN/FPS-35 frequency diverse radar at Thomasville Air Force Station in Alabama, operated by "Task Force Able" and later awarded a Unit Citation for Falling Leaves (698th commanded by Lt. Colonel Kenneth Gordon). (30 October)

== Operations ==
As Fred Dobbs writes of his experience as an airman at Thomasville Air Force Radar Base in Alabama (newly deployed in 1962).

In early October, 1962, we received word that a special team from Sperry was coming in to extend the range of our receiver by three to five times. This would make it possible for us to see objects up to 1500 miles away. At that range, our beam would be in space due the [sic] curvature of the earth. ... Our beam [from Alabama] was sweeping over Cuba first. Then a beam from a Texas radar swept across the top of ours. Finally, a radar in New Jersey was adjusted to sweep over the Texas beam. ... Now every scope had a "Full Bird Colonel" watching the sweep go round and round. ... Each of them had a headset, and an open mike to NORAD. If they saw a missile lift off from Cuba the word would be given to launch ours.

Information communicated to the BMEWS Central Computer and Display Facility located at Ent AFB in Boulder, Colorado was synthesized to provide missile warnings to display processors at the Pentagon and Strategic Air Command headquarters at Offutt AFB in Nebraska.

The FPS-49 radar detected a Cape Canaveral launched Titan II ICBM on 26 October (N-12 Mk 6 reentry vehicle test)—the trajectory was determined to be safely southeastward over the Atlantic Missile Range. On 28 October, a test tape inserted at the New Jersey radar site caused a false alarm indicating a missile would impact Tampa. Later the same day, an unidentified radar track over Georgia was recognized as a satellite. On 28 November, the New Jersey and Texas radars returned to their SPADATS mission, and the Alabama radar continued coverage for Cuba launches until late December.

After the Cuban Missile Crisis, a contract to Bendix Corporation was issued on 2 April 1962 to construct a long range radar at Eglin AFB, Florida. Under that contract, an AN/FPS-85 long-range phased-array radar was constructed beginning in October 1962.

In 1972, 20% of the FPS-85 surveillance capability became dedicated to search for SLBMs.
