= Mark Vizcarra =

American documentary filmmaker and retired United States Navy aviator

- Education: United States Navy Strike Fighter Tactics Instructor program; Los Angeles Film School
- Occupations: Filmmaker; pilot
- Military career
- Branch: United States Navy

Mark Vizcarra (born c. 1960) is an American documentary filmmaker and retired United States Navy aviator, serving as a Navy pilot and commander. Vizcarra founded Speed & Angels Productions and has directed films including Once Guilty, Now Innocent, Still Dead (2017), Thud Pilots (2018), Hun Pilots (2019), Tomcat Tales (2020) and More Tomcat Tales (2023).

== Early life and military career ==
At a young age, Vizcarra wanted to be a Navy pilot and a filmmaker. He served 21 years in the United States Navy and retired after reaching the rank of commander. Vizcarra put in more than 2,500 flight hours on the A-4 Skyhawk, F-14 Tomcat and F/A-18 Hornet and landed on nine aircraft carriers. He also graduated from the Navy Fighter Weapons School, commonly known as Top Gun.

Vizcarra spent eight years as commander of the Navy Junior Reserve Officers' Training Corps program at Patrick Henry High School in San Diego. He went on to study filmmaking at the Los Angeles Film School using benefits from the G.I. Bill.

== Filmmaking career ==
Vizcarra's experience as a naval aviator became a recurring influence on his filmmaking, establishing Speed & Angels Productions. He was interested in preserving veterans' experiences on film so that they could be understood by audiences that don't have a military background.

In 2017, Vizcarra wrote, directed and produced the Western short film Once Guilty, Now Innocent, Still Dead, based on the posthumous mock retrial of Tom Horn. The film won Best Narrative Short and Best Film Made by a Veteran or Service Member at the GI Film Festival San Diego. Another film of his, Forgotten Heroes, also screened at the festival and focused on Korean War naval aviator Royce Williams. Vizcarra's feature documentary Thud Pilots was about pilots who flew the Republic F-105 Thunderchief during the Vietnam War. It was inspired by a book written by Vizcarra's father, retired Air Force colonel Victor Vizcarra.

The New York Post consulted Vizcarra in 2020 for an article examining the accuracy of the 1986 film Top Gun. In 2023, Vizcarra made a documentary short called The Making of TOPGUN 2 about the aviators who served as technical advisers on Top Gun: Maverick.

== Filmography ==
Year	Title	Director	Writer	Editor	Notes
2016	The Flying Greek	Yes	Yes	No	
2017	Once Guilty, Now Innocent, Still Dead	Yes	Yes	Yes	Retrial of Tom Horn
2017	Forgotten Heroes	Yes	Yes	Yes	Focused on aviator Royce Williams
2018	Thud Pilots	Yes	Yes	Yes	About Republic F-105 Thunderchief pilots
2019	Hun Pilots	Yes	No	Yes	Story about F-100 Super Sabre pilots in Vietnam
2019	Libertas: 75th Anniversary of D-Day	Yes	No	Yes	About D-Day veteran Tom Rice
2020	Tomcat Tales	Yes	Yes	Yes	
2021	Thud Pilots II	Yes	Yes	Yes	
2022	Legends of Carrier Aviation	Yes	Yes	No	
2022	100 Years of U.S. Carriers	Yes	No	Yes	
2022	Tomcat: Top Gun 2 Resurrecting the F-14	Yes	No	Yes	
2023	More Tomcat Tales	Yes	Yes	No	
