= Rush week (disambiguation) =

Rush week is a recruitment process used in college fraternities and sororities

Rush week may also refer to:

- Rush Week, a 1988 slasher film
- Russ Weeks, state senator from West Virginia
