= Jay Pickett =

American actor (1961–2021)

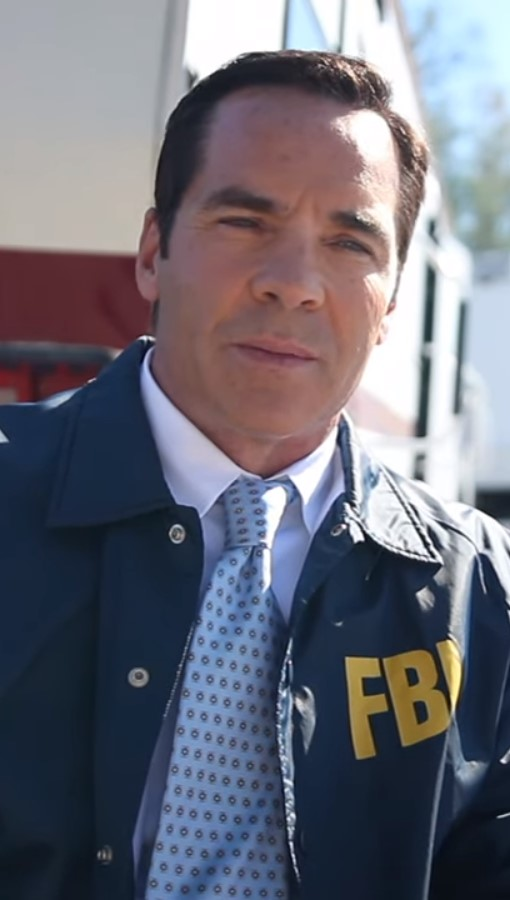
- Pickett in 2015
- Born: Jay Harris Pickett; February 10, 1961; Spokane, Washington, U.S.
- Died: July 30, 2021 (aged 60) near Oreana, Idaho, U.S.
- Education: Boise State University (BA); University of California, Los Angeles (MFA)
- Years active: 1987–2021
- Spouse: Elena Bates (m. 1986)
- Children: 3

Jay Harris Pickett (February 10, 1961 – July 30, 2021) was an American actor.

== Early life and education ==
Pickett was born in Spokane, Washington, and grew up in Caldwell, Idaho. He received his Bachelor of Arts degree in acting at Boise State University and his Master of Fine Arts in acting from the University of California, Los Angeles and appeared in numerous theatrical productions at both schools.

== Career ==
Pickett's television appearances include in the miniseries Rags to Riches, and roles on such series as China Beach, Mr. Belvedere, Dragnet, Jake and the Fatman, Days of Our Lives, Perry Mason, and Matlock.

In 1997, Pickett originated the role of Frank Scanlon, a dedicated paramedic and substitute teacher and the complicated older brother of Joe Scanlon, on the ABC Daytime drama Port Charles. In 2006, Pickett substituted for actor Ted King in the role of Lorenzo Alcazar on the soap opera General Hospital, the parent series of Port Charles. In 2007, Pickett rejoined the cast of General Hospital in the recurring role of Detective David Harper.

He enjoyed most sports, including football, basketball, baseball, and skiing. He was also an expert roper and western horse rider.

== Personal life ==
Pickett and his wife, Elena, resided in California and had three children. He was best friends with former Port Charles co-star Michael Dietz and was godfather to his daughter, Madison.

Pickett died unexpectedly from a heart attack while preparing to film a scene for the film Treasure Valley directed by Travis Mills on a set near Oreana, Idaho, on July 30, 2021, aged 60.

== Filmography ==
=== Films ===
Year	Title	Role	Notes
1989	Rush Week	Parker	
1991	Eve of Destruction	Man in Jeep	
1995	Rumpelstiltskin	Russell Stewart	
2008	Boston Strangler: The Untold Story	Detective Donovan	
2009	Drifter: Henry Lee Lucas	Officer Dollinger	
2009	Bundy: A Legacy of Evil	Ross Davis	
2009	The Real Deal	Grant Mussendon	
2010	Abandoned	Detective Franklin	
2012	Soda Springs	Eden	
2012	Unstable	Eric	
2014	The Real Deal	Grant Mussendon	
2014	A Matter of Faith	Stephen Whitaker	
2018	The Work Wife	Therapist	
2020	A Soldier's Revenge	Kennedy	
2021	Catch the Bullet	Britt	
2021	Last Shoot Out	Twigs	
2021	Heart of the Gun	John White	

=== Television ===
Year	Title	Role	Notes
1987	Rags to Riches	Alex Leskov	Episode: "Russian Holiday"
1988	China Beach	Filmore Cross	Episode: "Waiting for Beckett"
1989	Guts and Glory: The Rise and Fall of Oliver North	Radio Operator	Television film
1989	Mr. Belvedere	Keith Elliot	Episode: "Homecoming"
1990	Dragnet	Martin Helms	Episode: "Little Miss Nobody"
1991	Jake and the Fatman	Johnny Burgess	Episode: "Let's Call the Whole Thing Off"
1991	Matlock	Gary Andler	2 episodes
1991–1992	Days of Our Lives	Dr. Chip Lakin	34 episodes
1996	Hot Line	J.M.	Episode: "The Gardener"
1997–2003	Port Charles	Frank Scanlon	762 episodes
2005	Landslide	Stewart Hancock	Television film
2006–2008	General Hospital	David Harper / Lorenzo Alcazar	61 episodes
2007	Saving Grace	Eddie	Episode: "Would You Want Me to Tell You?"
2008	Dexter	Warren	Episode: "All in the Family"
2009	Desperate Housewives	Man	Episode: "If It's Only in Your Head"
2011	The Perfect Student	John	Television film
2012	The Mentalist	Cuffed Lawyer	Episode: "War of the Roses"
2015	NCIS: Los Angeles	Navy Commander Tom Harris	Episode: "In the Line of Duty"
2015	Kidnapped: The Hannah Anderson Story	Agent McKinnon	Television film
2015	16 and Missing	Lucas	Television film
2016	Inspired to Kill	Professor Cross	Television film
2017	Rosewood	Lukas Nilsson	Episode: "Asphyxiation & Aces"
2017	A Woman Deceived	Travis	Television film
2018	Queen Sugar	Attorney Flynn Daniels	Episode: "Your Passages Have Been Paid"
2019	Anniversary Nightmare	Bill	Television film
