= Michelle Hendley =

American actress and YouTuber (born 1991)

- Born: March 23, 1991 (age 35); Columbia, Missouri, United States
- Occupation: Actress
- Years active: 2014–present

Michelle Hendley (born March 23, 1991) is an American actress and YouTube personality. She is known for her role as Ricky in the 2014 film Boy Meets Girl.

== Career ==
Hendley was discovered by filmmaker Eric Schaeffer, who sought a transgender actress to play the lead role in Boy Meets Girl. Hendley had been documenting her transition on her YouTube video blog. After watching some of the videos, Schaeffer contacted Hendley to discuss the role. Hendley had not previously pursued a career as a performer, but reading the script and discussing the project with the director convinced her that the opportunity made sense.

== Filmography ==
=== Film ===
Year	Title	Role	Notes
2014	Boy Meets Girl	Ricky Jones	
2016	Soless	Hal	Short
2017	Jack and Jill	Joelle	Short
2019	The More Things Change	Dana	Short
2019	All the Little Things We Kill	Jody	
2020	Trashy Body	Kat	Short

=== Television ===
Year	Title	Role	Notes
2015	The Player	Sally Ride	
2016	Crazy Ex-Girlfriend	Daisy	Episode: "Why Is Josh's Ex-Girlfriend Eating Carbs?"
2017	Blindspot	Sam Kadhoda	Episode: "Upside Down Craft"
2018	Insatiable	Julie	Episode: "Bikinis and Bitches"
