= Larry Poole (actor) =

American actor and producer

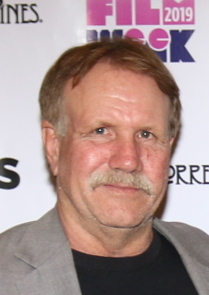
- Poole in 2019
- Occupations: Actor; film producer; wrangler
- Years active: 2014–present
- Known for: Portrayal of Tom Horn in Once Guilty, Now Innocent, Still Dead; A Soldier's Revenge; Last Shoot Out
- Notable credits: A Rodeo Film; The Final Wish
- Spouse: Racine Poole
- Awards: 2017 Best Actor at GI Film Festival San Diego

President of SAG-AFTRA San Diego
- Incumbent
- Assumed office September 5, 2023

Vice President of SAG-AFTRA San Diego
- In office 2017–2019

Larry Poole is an American actor, film producer and wrangler who appeared in the films Last Shoot Out (2021), A Soldier's Revenge (2020) and The Final Wish (2018). He produced A Rodeo Film (2019) and won Best Actor at GI Film Festival San Diego for his portrayal of Tom Horn in Once Guilty, Now Innocent, Still Dead (2017). Poole is the current President and former Vice President of SAG-AFTRA San Diego Local.

== Personal life ==
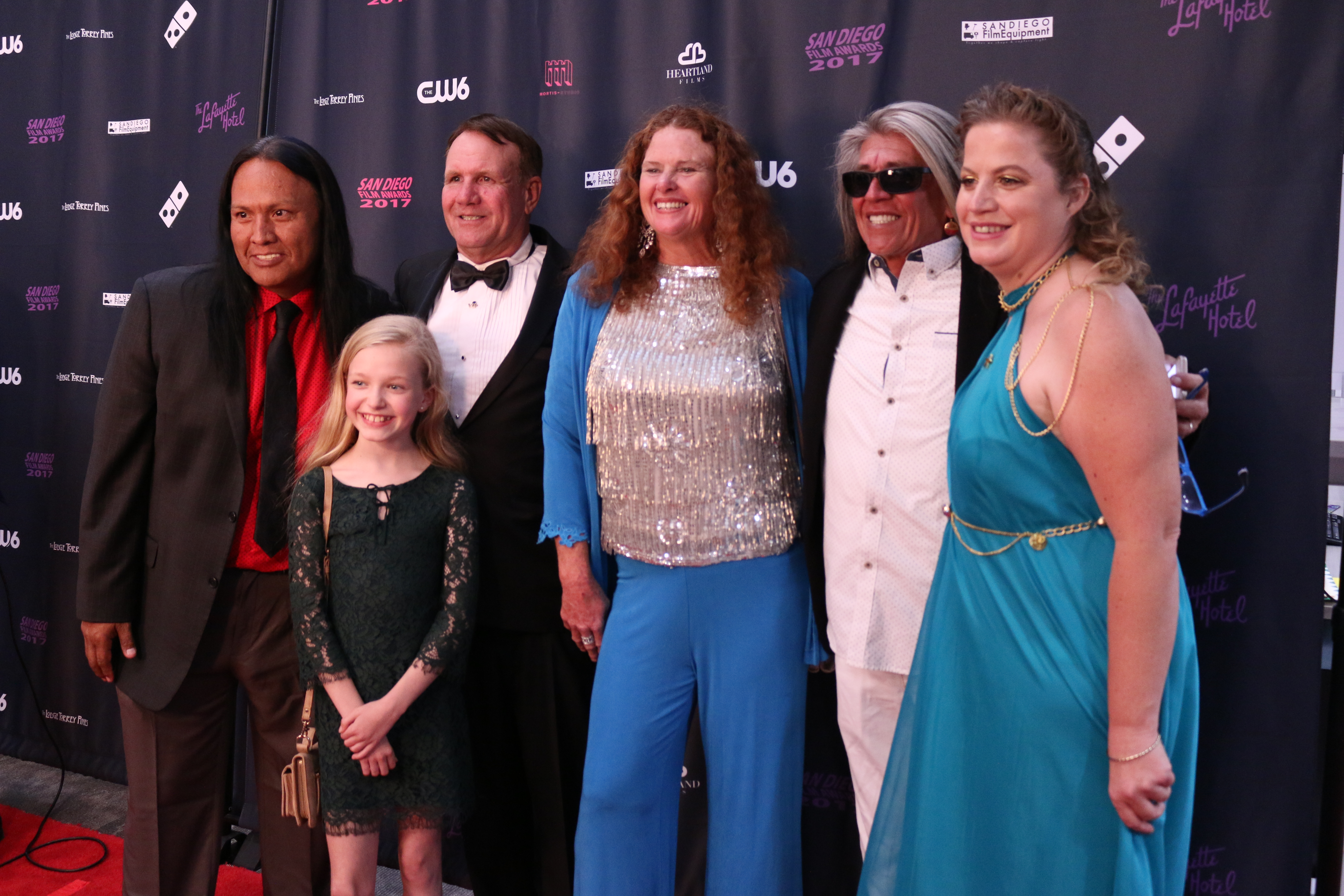
Poole with Arthur Redcloud, Jodi Cilley and others at the San Diego Film Awards in 2017.

Poole grew up in Seminole County, Florida, watching westerns as a child. He moved to Ramona, California, in the early 2000s with his wife, Racine. He was injured in 2014 at the Mother Goose Parade in El Cajon when his horse fell on him, breaking his leg.

== Career ==
Poole runs Gem Canyon Productions and co-produced a pilot based on Campo: The Forgotten Gunfight for KPBS. He has worked with Jake Busey, Val Kilmer and Bruce Dern and has starred in the films Last Shoot Out and A Soldier's Revenge. Poole was the head wrangler on a film called Why the Nativity? by David Jeremiah.

In 2017, he was voted to a two-year term as vice president of SAG-AFTRA San Diego Local, was a judge at the first Gong Show in Ramona, and won Best Actor at GI Film Festival San Diego for his portrayal of Tom Horn in Once Guilty, Now Innocent, Still Dead.

On July 28, 2023, Poole organized a strike in the Gaslamp district at San Diego Comic-Con with SAG-AFTRA members, WGA members and cosplayers. He was elected to a two-year term as president of SAG-AFTRA San Diego Local on September 5, 2023 and re-elected for another two years in 2025.

== Filmography ==
| Year | Title | Actor | Producer | Role |
|---|---|---|---|---|
| 2014 | Valley Inn | Yes | No | Band member |
| 2017 | Once Guilty, Now Innocent, Still Dead | Yes | Executive | Tom Horn |
| 2018 | The Final Wish | Yes | No | Chester Hammond |
| 2018 | Alpha Wolf | Yes | No | Neck Bodine |
| 2019 | A Rodeo Film | No | Executive | |
| 2020 | A Soldier's Revenge | Yes | No | McCabe |
| 2020 | Leave 'em Laughing | Yes | No | Frustrated Cowboy |
| 2021 | A Gunman's Hand | Yes | Yes | Pete |
| 2021 | Last Shoot Out | Yes | No | Wiley |
| 2021 | Heart of the Gun | Yes | No | Blind Billy |
| 2022 | Shooting Star | Yes | No | Deputy Petty |
| 2022 | Why the Nativity? | No | No | Head wrangler |
| 2023 | Mystery Highway | Yes | No | Horse Pool / Doctor James |

Accolades
List of awards and nominations
| Event | Year | Award | Title | Result | Ref. |
|---|---|---|---|---|---|
| GI Film Festival San Diego | 2017 | Best Actor | Once Guilty, Now Innocent, Still Dead | Won | |
| Oceanside International Film Festival | 2022 | Best Actor in a Lead Role | Sense of an Ending | Nominated | |
