= Once Guilty, Now Innocent, Still Dead =

- Directed by: Mark Vizcarra
- Written by: Mark Vizcarra
- Produced by: Mark Vizcarra
- Starring: Peter Sherayko; John Marrs; Larry Poole; Jor-el Vaasborg; Shane P. Allen
- Cinematography: Matt Triplow
- Edited by: Mark Vizcarra
- Release date: October 21, 2017 (GI Film Festival San Diego)
- Running time: 15 minutes
- Country: United States
- Language: English
- Budget: $23,000

Once Guilty, Now Innocent, Still Dead is a 2017 western short film written, directed, produced and edited by Mark Vizcarra. The film centers around the retrial of Tom Horn in Wyoming nearly a century after his sentencing and execution. It stars Peter Sherayko, John Marrs, Larry Poole, Jor-el Vaasborg, and Shane P. Allen.

== Cast ==
- Peter Sherayko as Otto Franc
- John Marrs as Undersheriff Richard Proctor
- Larry Poole as Tom Horn
- Jor-el Vaasborg as Willie Nickel
- Shane P. Allen as Joe LeFors
- Michael Lloyd Gilliland as Kels Nickel
- Byron Burnham as Townsman
- Carl Harrison as Sheriff
- Sam Neely as Townsman
- Bink Picard as Lone Rider

== Production ==
Vizcarra wrote the script and titled the film after reading a New York Times article on the mock trial of Tom Horn 90 years after his execution in Wyoming. Principal photography was in Ramona, California.

== Release ==
The film premiered on October 21, 2017, at GI Film Festival San Diego.

== Reception ==
Festival / event	Year	Award	Recipient(s)	Result	Ref.
GI Film Festival San Diego	2017	Best Narrative Short	Mark Vizcarra	Won	
GI Film Festival San Diego	2017	Best Film Made by a Veteran or Servicemember	Mark Vizcarra	Won	
GI Film Festival San Diego	2017	Local Choice Award	Mark Vizcarra	Nominated	
GI Film Festival San Diego	2017	Best Actor	Larry Poole	Won	
GI Film Festival San Diego	2017	Best Actor	Shane P. Allen	Nominated	
