= Michael Welch (actor) =

American actor

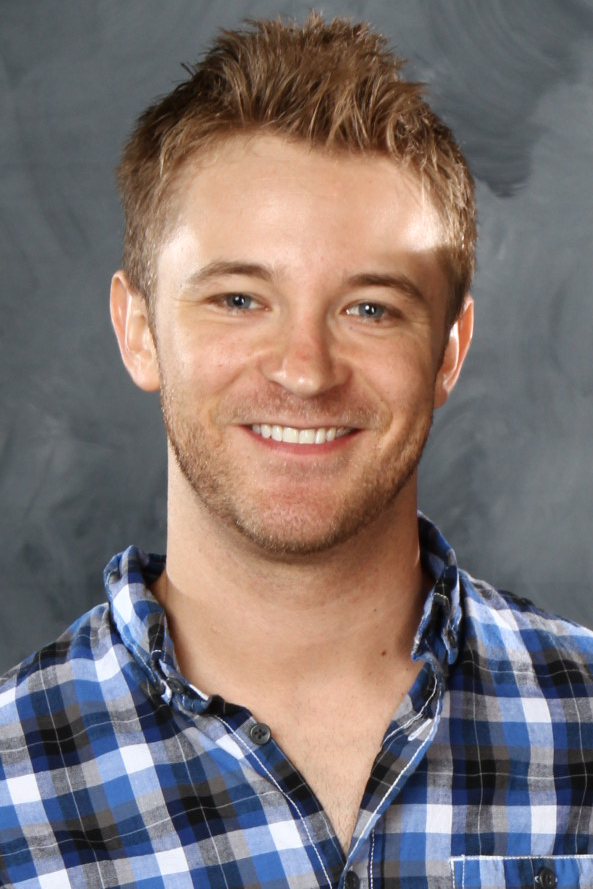
- Welch at the 2015 Florida SuperCon
- Born: July 25, 1987 (age 39); Los Angeles, California, U.S.
- Occupation: Actor
- Years active: 1998–present
- Spouses: Marissa Lefton (m. 2008; div. 2013) Samantha Maggio (m. 2016)
- Children: 2

Michael Welch (born July 25, 1987) is an American actor. He is best known for the role of Luke Girardi on the television series Joan of Arcadia and for the role of Mike Newton in the films Twilight, New Moon, Eclipse and Breaking Dawn.

== Career ==
Welch is known for his role as Mike Newton in The Twilight Saga film series. Although he auditioned for the part of Edward Cullen, he was cast in the role of Mike Newton. He's also well known for his role as Luke Girardi in the television series Joan of Arcadia, which ran for two seasons (2003–2005).

Welch was cast in the series Z Nation on Syfy, which began airing in the fall of 2014. He also appeared in the 2014 film Boy Meets Girl, a romantic comedy which received many awards at LGBT film festivals in the U.S. and internationally.

=== Awards ===
- Los Angeles FirstGlance Film Festival (2011) — Won, Festival Award – Best Actor for Unrequited (2010) (Lucky Day Studios)
- FilmOut San Diego (2014) — Won, FilmOut Festival Award – Best Actor for Boy Meets Girl.

Welch is the recipient of two Young Artist Awards. His first was for his performance in the film Star Trek: Insurrection at the age of 10. The second was for his work as Luke Girardi on Joan of Arcadia.

== Personal life ==
Welch's father is Protestant, and his mother is Jewish.

Welch married Marissa Lefton in 2008. The couple separated in 2011 and jointly filed for divorce in California on February 14, 2013. He married model Samantha Maggio in 2016. Welch has two children.

== Filmography ==
=== Film ===
Year	Title	Role	Notes
1998	Star Trek: Insurrection	Artim	
2001	Delivering Milo	Mr. Owen	
2001	Mickey's Magical Christmas: Snowed in at the House of Mouse	Pinocchio	Voice; direct-to-video film
2002	The Angel Doll	Little Jerry Barlow	
2003	The United States of Leland	Ryan Pollard	
2006	All the Boys Love Mandy Lane	Emmet	
2007	An American Crime	Teddy Lewis	
2008	Twilight	Mike Newton	
2008	Archie's Final Project	Earl	
2008	The Coverup	Kevin Thacker	
2008	Day of the Dead	Trevor Cross	
2009	The Twilight Saga: New Moon	Mike Newton	
2010	Unrequited	Ben Jacobs	
2010	The Twilight Saga: Eclipse	Mike Newton	
2011	Born Bad	Denny	Straight-to-DVD
2011	The Twilight Saga: Breaking Dawn – Part 1	Mike Newton	
2013	Grace Unplugged	Quentin	
2013	Hansel & Gretel Get Baked	Hansel Jaeger	
2014	Boy Meets Girl	Robby	
2014	Boys of Abu Ghraib	Pits	
2017	M.F.A.	Mason	
2018	The Final Wish	Aaron	
2019	Blood Craft	Tyler Waters	
2020	A Soldier's Revenge	Danziger	
2021	Last Shoot Out	Jody	

=== Television ===
Year	Title	Role	Notes
1998	Frasier	Young Niles	Episode: "Where Every Bloke Knows Your Name" (season 5, episode 10)
1998–1999	Two Guys, a Girl and a Pizza Place	Michael Rush	3 episodes
1999	7th Heaven	Donovan Birbeck	Episode: "All Dogs Go to Heaven" (season 3, episode 20)
1999	Walker, Texas Ranger	Adam Crossland	"Jacob's Ladder"
1999	Jesse	Gabe	3 episodes
2000	The Pretender	Eric Gantry	Episode: "School Daze" (Season 4, episode 16)
2001	The X-Files	Trevor	Episode: "Badlaa" (season 8, episode 10)
2001	Malcolm In The Middle	Josh	Episode: "New Neighbors" (season 2, episode 13)
2001–2003	House of Mouse	Pinocchio	
2002	Fillmore!	Wade	
2002	CSI: Crime Scene Investigation	Todd Branson	Episode: "Blood Lust" (season 3, episode 9)
2003	Stargate SG-1	Young Jack	Episode: "Fragile Balance" (season 7, episode 3)
2003–2005	Joan of Arcadia	Luke Girardi	Main role; Young Artist Award winner
2005	Cold Case	Daniel Potter – 1972	Episode: "Honor" (season 3, episode 8)
2005	Crossing Jordan	Boy raised from the dead	Episode "Mysterious Ways" (season 5, episode 19)
2006	NCIS	Kody Meyers	Episode: "Bait" (season 3, episode 18)
2007	CSI: Miami	Shane Partner	Episode: "Permanent Vacation" (season 6, episode 8)
2007	Law & Order: Special Victims Unit	Scott Heston	Episode: "Pretend" (season 8, episode 21)
2008	The Riches	Ike	4 episodes
2010	Criminal Minds	Syd Pearson	Episode: "JJ" (season 6, episode 2)
2011	Bones	Norman Hayes	Episode: "The Feet on the Beach" (season 6, episode 17)
2013	Grimm	Jake Barnes	Episode: "One Night Stand" (season 3, episode 4)
2014–2015	Z Nation	Mack Thompson	Main role
2015	Scandal	Officer Newton	Episode: "The Lawn Chair" (season 4, episode 14)
2015	NCIS: New Orleans	Kevin Heller	Episode: "The List" (season 1, episode 18)
2016	Lucifer	Kyle Erikson	Episode: "St. Lucifer" (season 1, episode 11)
2016	The Catch	Teddy Seavers	Episode: "The Ringer" (season 1, episode 7)
2016	Another Period	Franklin D. Roosevelt	Episode: "Roosevelt" (season 2, episode 5)
2017–2019	Star vs the Forces of Evil	Mewni Crowd	
2017	The Bachelor Next Door	Donnie	TV film
2018	Home by Spring	Howard	TV film
2018	I'll Be Watching	Jake Marsh	TV film
2019	Who's Stalking Me?	James Dawson	TV film
2019	Station 19	Harold	Episode: "Crazy Train" (season 2, episode 10)
2019	Erasing His Past	David	TV film
2020	A Christmas Hero	Nick	TV film
