= Our Lady, Queen of Heaven Church =

Historic church in Idaho, United States

- U.S. National Register of Historic Places
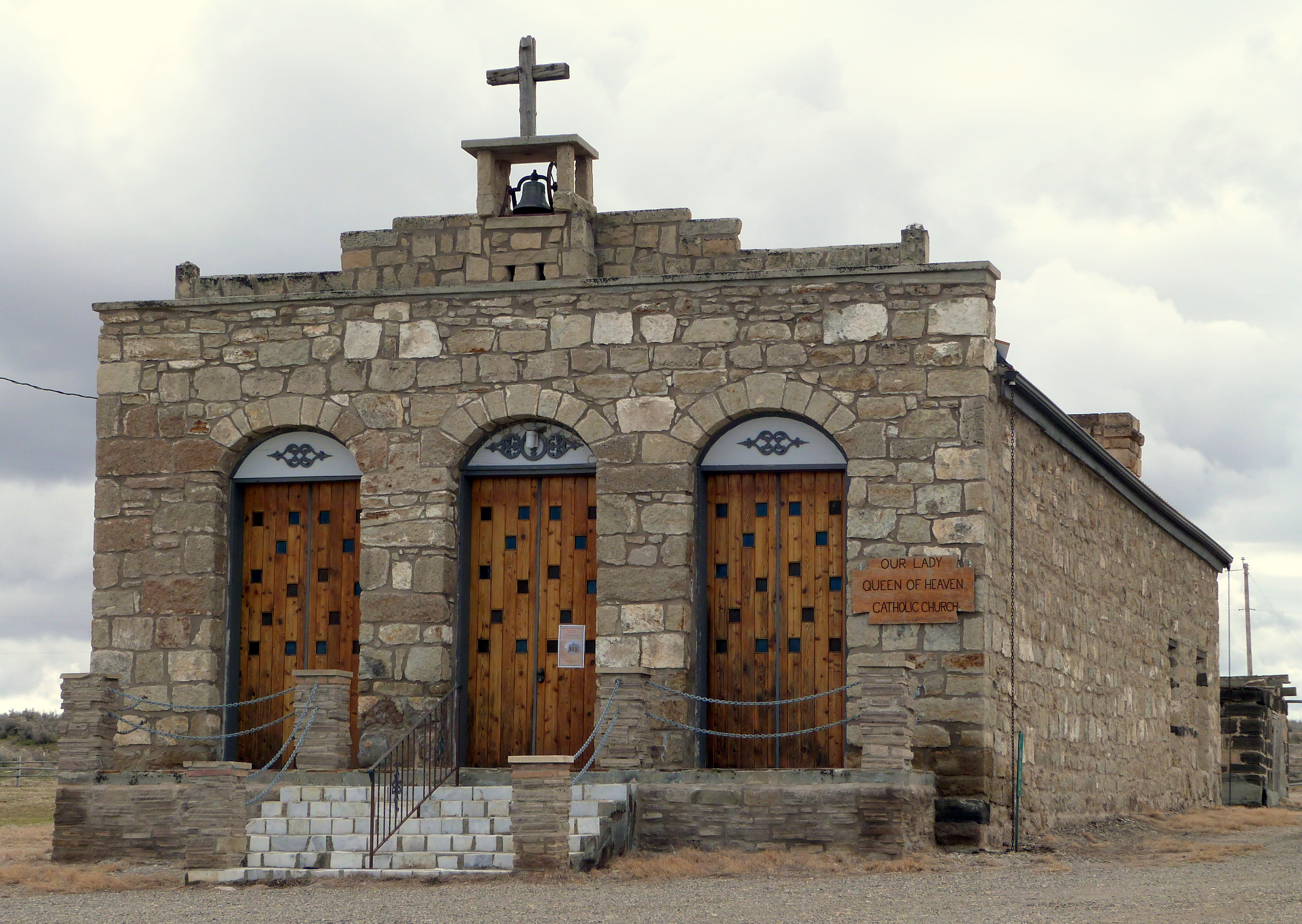
- Our Lady, Queen of Heaven Church in 2015

- Location within Idaho Location within the United States
- Location: Oreana Loop Road; Oreana, Idaho
- Coordinates: 43°02′25″N 116°23′41″W
- Area: less than one acre
- Built: 1883
- NRHP reference No.: 80001333
- Added to NRHP: November 28, 1980

Our Lady, Queen of Heaven Church is a Roman Catholic church in Oreana, Idaho. The church's building was built c. 1883, originally to house Oreana's general store and post office. It was renovated in 1961 as a church.

== Description ==
When the building was constructed, it was part of a corner which included Oreana's saloon, hotel, and school; the general store building is the only surviving structure from this set. The lava rock building features a false front and a wooden cornice atop its parapet roofline. In addition to serving as a general store, the building also house Oreana's first post office, which opened in 1885. In 1961, the building was renovated to become a Catholic church; the renovation project added a number of Gothic features but left the building's overall design intact.

The building was added to the National Register of Historic Places on November 28, 1980.
