= Arthur Redcloud =

Native American actor

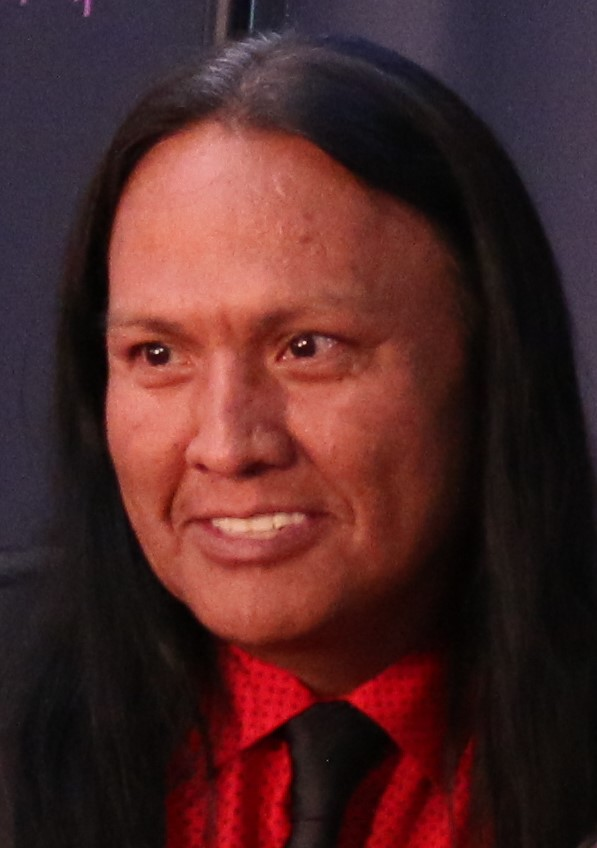
Arthur Redcloud at the San Diego Film Awards 2017.jpg

Arthur Redcloud is a Native American actor, known for his role as Hikuc in the 2015 film The Revenant.

== Early life ==
Redcloud is Navajo and grew up in Window Rock, Arizona, on the Navajo reservation. He attended Haskell Indian Nations University in Lawrence, Kansas, then eventually settled in Colleyville, Texas. Redcloud became a Christian in the early 2000s, and while working as a part-time security guard for Gateway Church when he was a police officer, he began attending weekend services in 2004.

== Acting career ==
The Revenant was Redcloud's first role in a major feature film. Before it, he had taken some acting classes and acted for two to three years in low budget films. For his audition, Redcloud took time off from his job as a fuel delivery driver and drove 635 miles (1,022 km) from Dallas, Texas to Santa Fe, New Mexico in one night to try out for the part of Hikuc, a Pawnee man who comes to the aid of Hugh Glass (played by Leonardo DiCaprio). After a call-back audition in Canada, he got the part.

To make the film, Redcloud said the actors frequently rehearsed for 12 to 14 hours in the freezing cold near Calgary, Alberta, and later in Argentina. He called the film a "spiritual awakening" for him that not only brought him closer to his co-star DiCaprio and the rest of the cast but made him appreciate how much more difficult life was for everyone in the past. He said, "I think we're forgetting about how hard it was for not just their ancestors, but people like your own lineage of your family. What was it like for your grandfather's grandfather to make it, and to get through whatever."

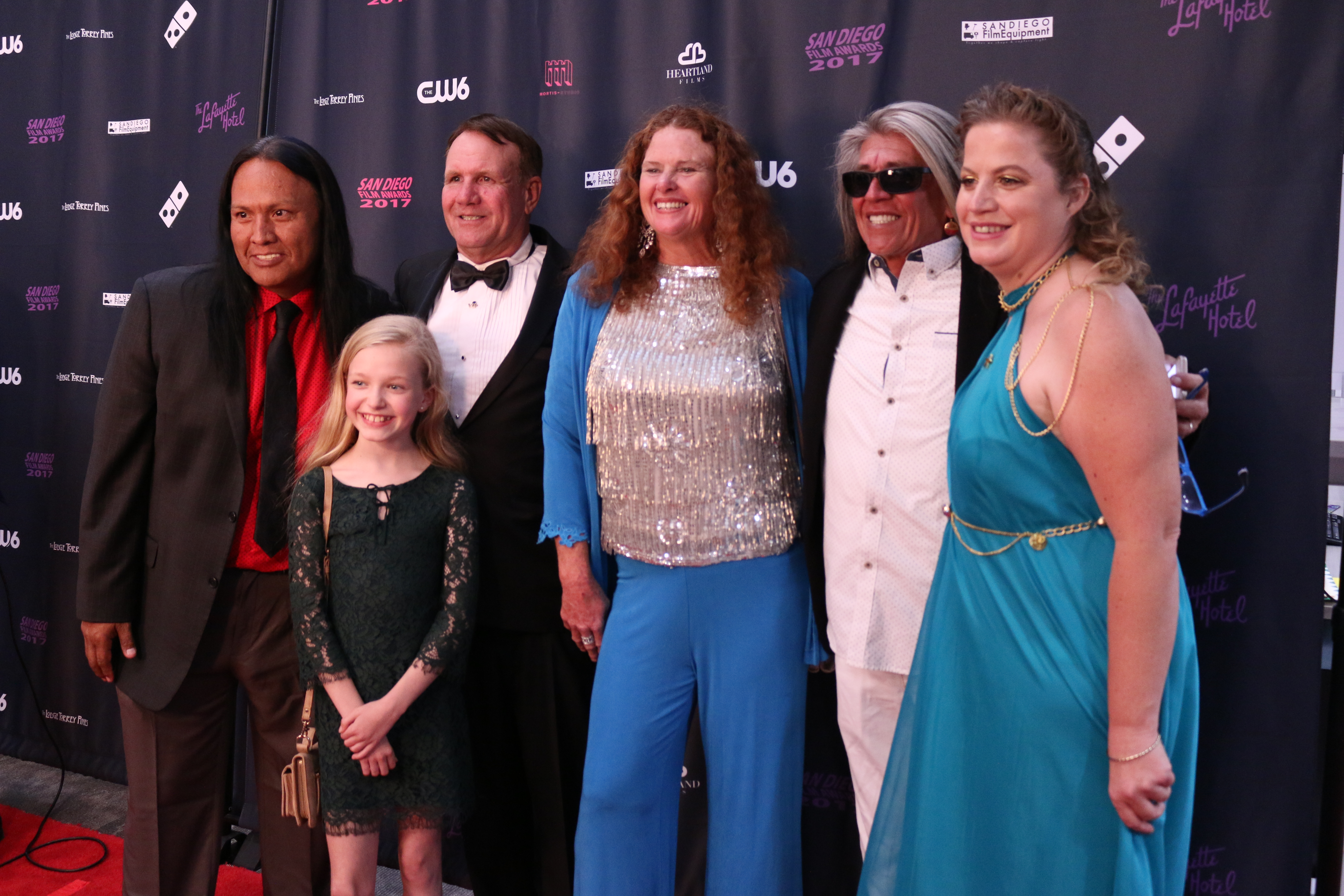
Redcloud with Larry Poole, Jodi Cilley and others at the San Diego Film Awards in 2017

He has credited director Alejandro G. Innaritu for correcting perceptions of Native and First Nations people in his film and for being open to learning about their culture from his Native and First Nations actors. "This film gets to the heart of our people as far as who we are and what we are, and also honors our ancestors," he said. For the role, Redcloud researched his character's time period and learned the Pawnee language. The healing prayers that Redcloud speaks in the film are Navajo blessings that were handed down to him from his medicine man grandfather. He also credits his grandfather's knowledge for a mostly improvised scene when his character creates an impromptu shelter in the wild.

DiCaprio said that Redcloud, whose ancestors ate raw bison meat on their migrations, gave him the strength and incentive to eat raw bison liver in the film.

In 2022, Redcloud played the role of a Mabo warrior in the HBO series Our Flag Means Death (Season 1, Episode 2).
