= A Soldier's Revenge =

2020 American Western film

- Film poster
- Directed by: Michael Feifer
- Written by: Michael Feifer
- Produced by: Michael Feifer; Peter Sherayko
- Starring: Neal Bledsoe; Rob Mayes; AnnaLynne McCord; Val Kilmer
- Cinematography: Jordi Ruiz Masó
- Edited by: Jeff Fuller; Josh Muscatine
- Music by: Brandon Jarrett
- Production companies: Feifer Worldwide; Caravan West Productions
- Distributed by: Well Go USA Entertainment
- Release date: June 16, 2020
- Running time: 140 minutes
- Country: United States
- Language: English
- Budget: $5 million

A Soldier's Revenge, also titled Soldier's Heart, is a 2020 American Western film written and directed by Michael Feifer and starring Neal Bledsoe, Rob Mayes, AnnaLynne McCord and Val Kilmer. It was Jay Pickett's final film role before his death in July 2021.

== Cast ==
- Neal Bledsoe as Frank Connor
- Rob Mayes as Travis Briggs
- AnnaLynne McCord as Heather Powell
- Val Kilmer as CJ Connor
- Jake Busey as Captain McCalister
- Michael Bowen as Feldman
- Jay Pickett as Kennedy
- Michael Welch as Danziger
- James Russo as Walsh
- Larry Poole as McCabe
