= Boy Meets Girl (2014 film) =

2014 film by Eric Schaeffer

- Theatrical release poster
- Directed by: Eric Schaeffer
- Written by: Eric Schaeffer
- Produced by: Eric Schaeffer; Edward Aitken; Elisa Pugliese; Charles Blackstone; Rudolf J. Waldner; Gail Smerigan
- Starring: Michael Welch; Michelle Hendley; Alexandra Turshen; Michael Galante; Randall Newsome; Joseph Ricci; Elizabeth Ward Land; Christopher McHale
- Cinematography: Violetta D'Agata; Andrew Ravani
- Edited by: Frank Reynolds
- Music by: Matthew Puckett
- Distributed by: Wolfe Video
- Release dates: June 28, 2014 (Frameline Film Festival); February 6, 2015 (United States)
- Running time: 99 minutes
- Country: United States
- Language: English

Boy Meets Girl is a 2014 American romantic comedy-drama film directed by Eric Schaeffer and starring Michelle Hendley as a trans woman living in a small town in Kentucky, looking for love.

== Plot ==
21-year-old Ricky is a transgender woman living in a small town in Kentucky with big dreams to move to New York and attend a school of fashion design. Ricky is working as a barista and spends most of her time hanging out with her only friend Robby, who has been by her side for the past 15 years. One day while Ricky is at work, Francesca, a woman from town, walks in and a friendship unexpectedly blossoms that then turns into an affair.

== Cast ==
- Michael Welch as Robby Riley
  - Robert Racco as 9-year-old Robby Riley
- Michelle Hendley as Ricky Jones
  - Rachel Racco as 9-year-old Ricky Jones
- Alexandra Turshen as Francesca Duval
- Michael Galante as David Applebee
- Randall Newsome as Hank Jones
- Joseph Ricci as Sam Jones
- Elizabeth Ward Land as Helen Duval
- Christopher McHale as Dayton Duval

== Critical reception ==
Gary Goldstein of the Los Angeles Times gave the film a favorable review, calling it a "lovely story, one which brims with credible, enormously heartfelt emotion". The Washington Post gave it two stars out of four, stating that "Boy Meets Girl comes across not just as an emotional story, but also an earnestly instructive one."
