= The Final Wish =

2018 horror film directed by Timothy Woodward Jr.

- Film poster
- Directed by: Timothy Woodward Jr.
- Screenplay by: Jeffrey Reddick; William Halfon; Jonathan Doyle
- Story by: Jeffrey Reddick
- Produced by: Johnny Cleveland; Thommy Hutson; Jeffrey Reddick
- Starring: Lin Shaye; Michael Welch; Melissa Bolona; Spencer Locke; Tony Todd
- Cinematography: Pablo Diez
- Edited by: Ned Thorne
- Music by: Samuel Joseph Smythe
- Production company: Global Renaissance Entertainment Group
- Distributed by: Cinedigm Entertainment Group
- Release dates: October 17, 2018 (Screamfest Horror Film Festival); January 24, 2019
- Running time: 95 minutes
- Country: United States
- Language: English
- Box office: $95,220

The Final Wish is a 2018 mystery-horror film directed by Timothy Woodward Jr., written by Jeffrey Reddick (also co-producer), William Halfon and Jonathan Doyle, and starring Lin Shaye and Michael Welch. Distributed by Cinedigm Entertainment Group, The Final Wish was released on October 17, 2018 at the Screamfest Horror Film Festival.

== Plot ==
After a date, a young girl returns home to discover her mother killed, her body cut in half. She is then cornered by her father, covered in blood and holding a samurai sword.

Following his father's death, struggling law school graduate Aaron Hammond returns to his rural hometown. Dealing with grief and the unresolved tension with his mother, Kate, Aaron goes through his father's belongings.

Aaron discovers an antique urn that was recently acquired by his father, a keen collector of old artifacts. Aaron tries to sell the urn online for $3,000 to cover his missed rent. His best friend Jeremy come over and they get high, before going to a local diner.

Unbeknownst to Aaron, he had inadvertently released a malevolent wish-granting spirit trapped in the urn. When Aaron blurted out what he wishes would happen, they lead to devastating consequences. One of Aaron's wishes is for his mother, Kate, to forget about his father so she can move on from her grief. As a result Kate loses all her memories, and is reduced to a state of utter confusion and anguish. Hearing music coming from the barn, Aaron investigates and finds his mother dancing with his father's corpse. Aaron, shocked, wishes his father away, making his mother angry.

Aaron finds that Jeremy has disappeared, and learn from Jeremy’s mother that he died in a car accident a year ago.

Consulting an antique dealer introduced by his friend Lisa, Aaron learns that the urn might be a 'Dybbuk box', notorious in Jewish folklore for containing malevolent spirits. They visit the house of the previous owner, William, the man who killed his wife as shown at the movie's beginning (and later cut out his tongue). They meet William's daughter, who takes them to the asylum where her father communicates by writing. He warns Aaron against making a 7th wish (he has made 5 or 6) or he will lose his soul.

The djinn starts taunting Aaron. As Aaron and Lisa get back to Aaron’s place, they look for his mother. When they check the barn, they find his mother hanging from the beam. Aaron calls 911, but instead has hallucinations. He tells the djinn to show themselves, and the djinn appears as an entity. Aaron tries to kill himself, but a knock at the door reveals it to be the sheriff. The sheriff tells Aaron to stay away from Lisa. Aaron makes a wish that he would stop hurting Lisa. However, the sheriff turns out to be the djinn, telling Aaron "As you wish".

Lisa turns up at Tyrone’s and tells him that the sheriff is getting the judge to revoke his bail - that the sheriff has evidence. The sheriff returns home, where Lisa is in the bathtub. Tyrone turns up at the sheriffs house, where he confronts him about the so-called revoke of his bail. Lisa gets a phone call from Aaron, but she gets out of the bathtub, missing Aaron's call. As she heads up the stairs, she sees Tyrone and the sheriff fighting and quickly pulls Tyrone off the sheriff. Tyrone tells Lisa that she told him about the revoke of his bail, to which Lisa says that she has not seen him all week. The sheriff gets up and Tyrone shoots him dead. Aaron quickly bolts through the door and tells Lisa that he made a wish that the sheriff would never hurt Lisa again. Tyrone, confused, tells them to tell him what is going on. He accidentally shoots Lisa, who dies in Aaron’s arms.

Aaron makes one final wish as the djinn appears. Aaron wishes that he died the day Tyrone moved his car and hit him. The next day, Aaron wakes up in his bed. He waves at the mirror next to the bed and takes a sip of water from the glass next to his bed. Soon, Aaron realizes that he isn’t in his room and that his soul is stuck in the mirror. The movie ends with Kate doing a yard sale. Lisa shows up, and Kate tells Lisa that she's moving and is looking forward to it. Lisa tells Kate to come visit her in Chicago. Kate smiles and gives the urn to Lisa, hinting at the continuation of the curse.

== Cast ==
- Lin Shaye as Kate Hammond
- Michael Welch as Aaron Hammond
- Melissa Bolona as Lisa
- Spencer Locke as Lynette
- Tony Todd as Colin
- Kaiwi Lyman-Mersereau as Derek (credited as "Kaiwi Lyman")
- Jonathan Daniel Brown as Jeremy
- Jean Elie as Tyrone
- Christopher Murray as Yates
- Douglas Tait as Jinn
- Larry Poole as Chester Hammond

== Reception ==
On review aggregator Rotten Tomatoes, The Final Wish has an approval rating of 67% based on 12 reviews, with an average score of 5.9/10. Frank Ochieng from the "SF Crowsnest" gave the film 2.5 out of 4 stars and stated: "Wish is strangely contemplative in its attempt to shine an eerie light on the mysteries of death and estrangement. Woodward's gory gem is more of the psychological horror variety as it adequately taps into the realm of a messy mindset gone haywire." Noel Murray, reviewing for the newspaper Los Angeles Times, opined, "By the time 'The Final Wish' gets to the much more effective suspense sequences - and the enjoyably perverse twists - it's too little and too late." Jennie Kermode from the online magazine "Eye for Film" gave the movie 3.5 out of 5 stars and wrote: "Focused primarily on psychological horror but also dealing out a fair number of shocks and scares, The Final Wish is a well-crafted film that's likely to appeal to a broad range of genre fans."
