= Jodi Cilley =

American film producer

- Born: Barre, Vermont
- Education: Boston College; San Diego State University
- Occupations: Film producer; college professor
- Years active: 2012-present
- Known for: Film Consortium San Diego; San Diego Film Awards; San Diego Film Week

Jodi Cilley is an American college professor and film producer known for founding Film Consortium San Diego and San Diego Film Awards.

== Life and career ==
Cilley was born and raised in Barre, Vermont. In 1999, she graduated from Boston College with a BA in Sociology. By 2010, Cilley finished her MBA in Business Administration-Entrepreneurship at San Diego State University and in 2011, was an instructor for Media Arts Center San Diego. Cilley became a part of the advisory committee for GI Film Festival San Diego and a Community Voices contributor for The San Diego Union Tribune in 2020. Later that year, Sue Vicory produced Panic at Parq, a tribute short film to Cilley.

=== Film Consortium San Diego ===
Cilley founded the Film Consortium San Diego in 2012. The Film Consortium collaborated with the Arts Program at San Diego International Airport to form the Quarantine Film Challenge in 2020. Later that year, a Black Lives Matter Film Challenge was announced. In 2021, KPBS launched Film Consortium TV.

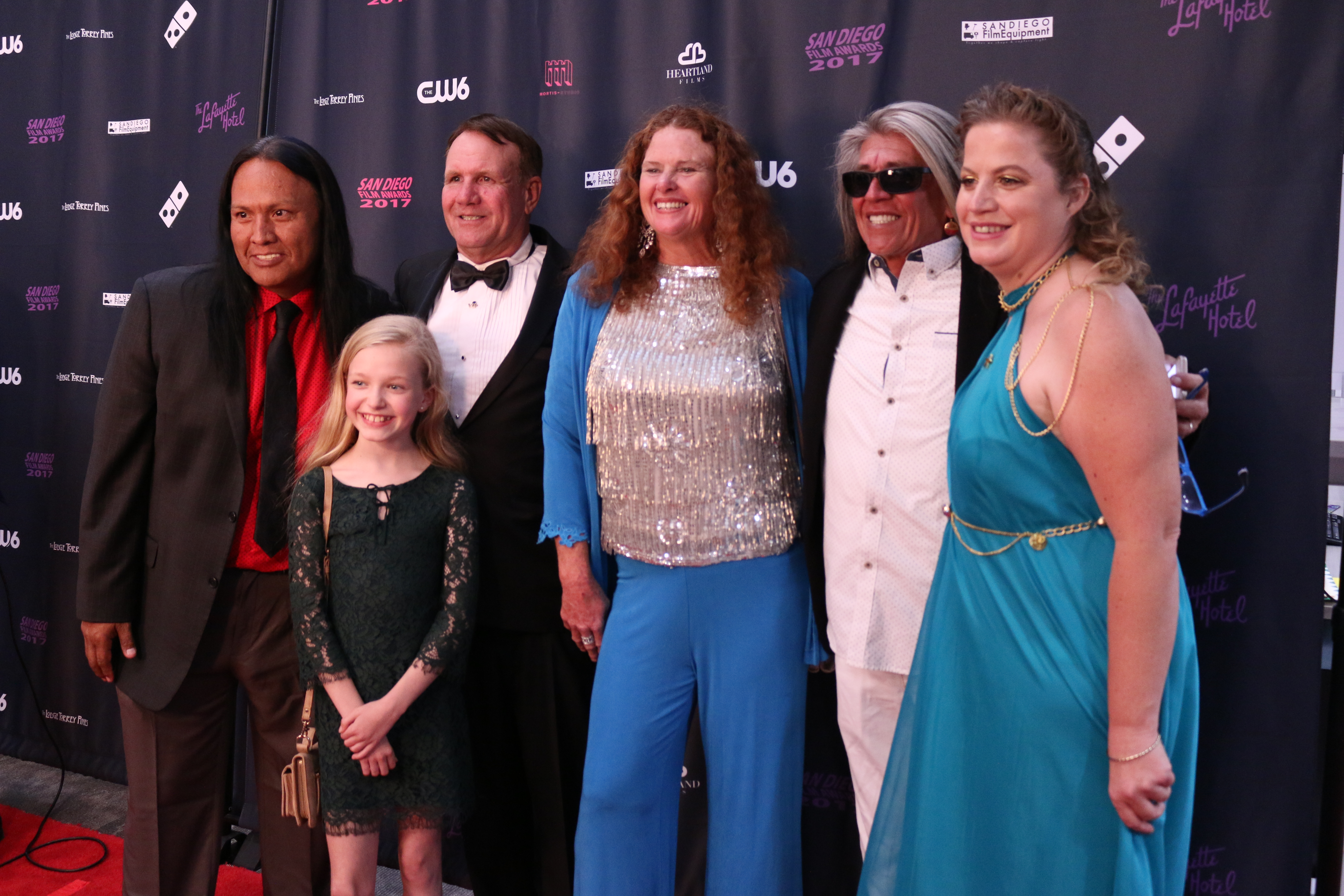
Cilley, Arthur Redcloud, Larry Poole and others at the VIP Red Carpet for 4th annual San Diego Film Awards on April 2, 2017.

==== San Diego Film Week ====
In 2017, Cilley founded San Diego Film Week. It was a ten day event of screenings that partnered with numerous local festivals including the San Diego International Film Festival and the San Diego Asian Film Festival. Wonderland Syndrome, one of many films at the 2018 festival, was funded with the help of the Film Consortium.
