= Mystery Highway =

2023 anthology film by Clarke M. Smith

- Release poster
- Directed by: Clarke M. Smith
- Written by: Clarke M. Smith; David S. Dawson
- Produced by: David S. Dawson; Raechyl Esther Borman; Analise Nelson
- Starring: Rachel Elizabeth Ames; Christopher Cendana; Randy Davison; Larry Poole; James Steinberg; Whitney Wegman-Wood; Walter M. Nowosad Jr.
- Cinematography: Mike Peterson
- Edited by: Clarke M. Smith
- Music by: Reber Clark
- Production companies: TimeAxis Entertainment; Intellexual Entertainment
- Distributed by: Filmhub
- Release date: January 10, 2023 (VOD)
- Running time: 90 minutes
- Country: United States
- Language: English
- Budget: $5,000

Mystery Highway is a 2023 American science fiction horror anthology film directed by Clarke M. Smith and written by Smith and David S. Dawson. It stars Rachel Elizabeth Ames, Christopher Cendana, Randy Davison, and Larry Poole. As truckers drive along a highway, they listen to a radio station that covers six different short stories.

== Plot ==
Radio DJ George Bell hosts a weekly radio drama series called Mystery Highway, where truckers tune in to listen to stories of science fiction and the paranormal. The truckers imagine themselves as characters in separate stories told by Bell. After the show's intro, Bell begins telling the first of six dramas.

The first story is called Stover Hill, where a group of 30-something friends are socializing one evening at one of their homes. One of the friends, Will, begins acting strangely. A power failure plunges the group into darkness, only to be blasted by intense lights coming from outside. Will runs outside, leaving the other confused. He returns and begins to use an unearthly power to take over the rest of the group. The mother tells her 10-year-old daughter to hide, which she does. When the lights outside subside, the mother later finds her daughter, but its unclear as to which has been taken over by the alleged alien presence.

The second story is called Crazy Joe. Joe is a widower who takes care of his 12-year-old daughter. A local bar fly named Rumsfield teases and taunts Joe, as he often sees him talking to himself in public. It is revealed via a nightmare, that Joe was responsible for his wife's death in an automobile accident, where Joe and their daughter survived. In the end, it is revealed that the daughter did not survive, and she is a ghost, remaining to take care of, and defend, her now alcoholic and guilt-ridden father against people like Rumsfield.

The third story is called Dark Chocolate, where a dock worker is asked by an elderly boat captain to come aboard for a drink. The worker politely agrees, and the captain tells him that he'd like to give him his boat if he wins a game of poisoned chocolate roulette. The worker reluctantly agrees, and they begin eating each chocolate piece, one of which is injected with poison. The scene fades out, and it is revealed that the captain is eyeing another blue collar worker, and asks if he'd like to come and have a drink.

The fourth story is called The Loyal Remnant, where a group left behinds by the rapture roam the empty countryside. One evening, a man joins the group, as they continue to search for redemption. It is revealed that the man is Satan, and he tries unsuccessfully to kill them, as they pray him away.

The fifth story is called Discontinuance, which follows a man who wakes up in the desert, after an apparent alien abduction. He walks to a bar and begins talking to another customer, and learns that his daughter, who was with him when he was abducted, has become famous for spewing irrational rhetoric about how her father was abducted by aliens. Hearing this, the man rushes to go find his daughter, and they reunite.

The sixth and last story is called You Are Me. Greyson is a brilliant scientist who is dying of a disease from being infected in a mining town in his youth. He builds a robot/clone hybrid of himself in order for it to carry on with his wife, unaware of his illness. He dies, and the clone takes over his life. It is revealed that his wife, who was also infected in the mine town, had already previously died, and is a clone herself. Because they are now both clones, their mechanical bodies cancel the other out, and they malfunction and freeze.

Returning to the disc jockey studio, George Bell recaps the stories and bids farewell to his listeners, and invites them to return next time for another evening of exciting and interesting stories.

== Cast ==
- Rachel Elizabeth Ames as The Lioness / Robin / Grace
- Christopher Cendana as Aussie Chris / Bill Hernandez
- Randy Davison as Paladin / Rich / Greyson
- Larry Poole as Horse Pool / Doctor James
- James Steinberg as Crazy Jimbo / Joe
- Whitney Wegman-Wood as Bonnie / Henrietta Hill
- Walter M. Nowosad Jr. as George Bell
- Shane P. Allen as Henry Hill
- Yvette Angulo as Trish
- Mike Brayden as Will
- Brian Buckley Smith as Conrad Rumsfield
- Hannah Frantz as Lizzie Russell
- Jay Jee as Jon
- Danny Morris as Ed Perill
- Elizabeth Popovich as Ashley
- Lon Sierra as Nick
- Annie Willett as Aerin

== Production ==
The film was made for a budget of $5,000.

== Release ==
The film was released on January 10, 2023, distributed by Filmhub. It was later released on YouTube on June 14, 2024.

== Reception ==
=== Critical response ===
Film critic Michael Knox-Smith recommended the film, scoring it 5 out of 5, comparing it to Tales of Halloween and The ABCs of Death. Film Threat scored the film 7 out of 10, calling it "a fresh take on various subgenres in a genuine way." Brian Fanelli at Horror Buzz wrote that it "has some memorable entries and others that are a mixed bag," giving it a 6 out of 10.

Celia Payne at Let's Talk Terror praised the film, saying "Mystery Highway is a psychological work of art that creates space for you to add your own what ifs."

Jim McLennan at Film Blitz gave the film a C+ rating, stating that "it's almost exactly an even spread of the good, the bad and the indifferent" but that "the ideas for the segments here are generally interesting too."

=== Accolades ===
Festival	Year	Category	Recipient	Result	Ref
San Diego Movie Awards	2021	Best Actor (You Are Me segment)	Randy Davison	Won	
San Diego Film Awards	2022	Best Narrative Feature	Clarke M. Smith	Nominated	
San Diego Film Awards	2022	Best Original Composition	Reber Clark	Nominated	
