= Last Shoot Out =

2021 American Western film

- Release poster
- Directed by: Michael Feifer
- Written by: Lee Martin
- Produced by: Michael Feifer
- Starring: Michael Welch; Cam Gigandet; Bruce Dern
- Cinematography: Hank Baumert Jr.
- Edited by: Ted Gianopulos
- Music by: Robert Arzola; Michael Feifer
- Production companies: Grindstone Entertainment Group; Milestone Studios; Third Child Entertainment
- Distributed by: Lionsgate
- Release date: December 3, 2021
- Running time: 86 minutes 95 minutes
- Country: United States
- Language: English

Last Shoot Out is a 2021 American western film directed by Michael Feifer, and starring Michael Welch, Cam Gigandet and Bruce Dern.

== Cast ==
- Michael Welch as Jody
- Cam Gigandet as Sid
- Bruce Dern as Blair Callahan
- Skylar Witte as Jocelyn
- Jay Pickett as Twigs
- David DeLuise as Joe.
- Brock Harris as Billy Tyson
- Peter Sherayko as Red
- Larry Poole as Wiley

== Release ==
The film was released in select theaters and digital rental on December 3, 2021 and on DVD, Blu-Ray and Digital purchase on December 7, 2021.

== Reception ==
Joe Leydon of Variety gave the film a positive review, calling it “a small-budget indie that aims to please the currently underserved niche audience for oaters.”
