= Tom Rice (soldier) =

WWII US Army paratrooper (1921–2022)

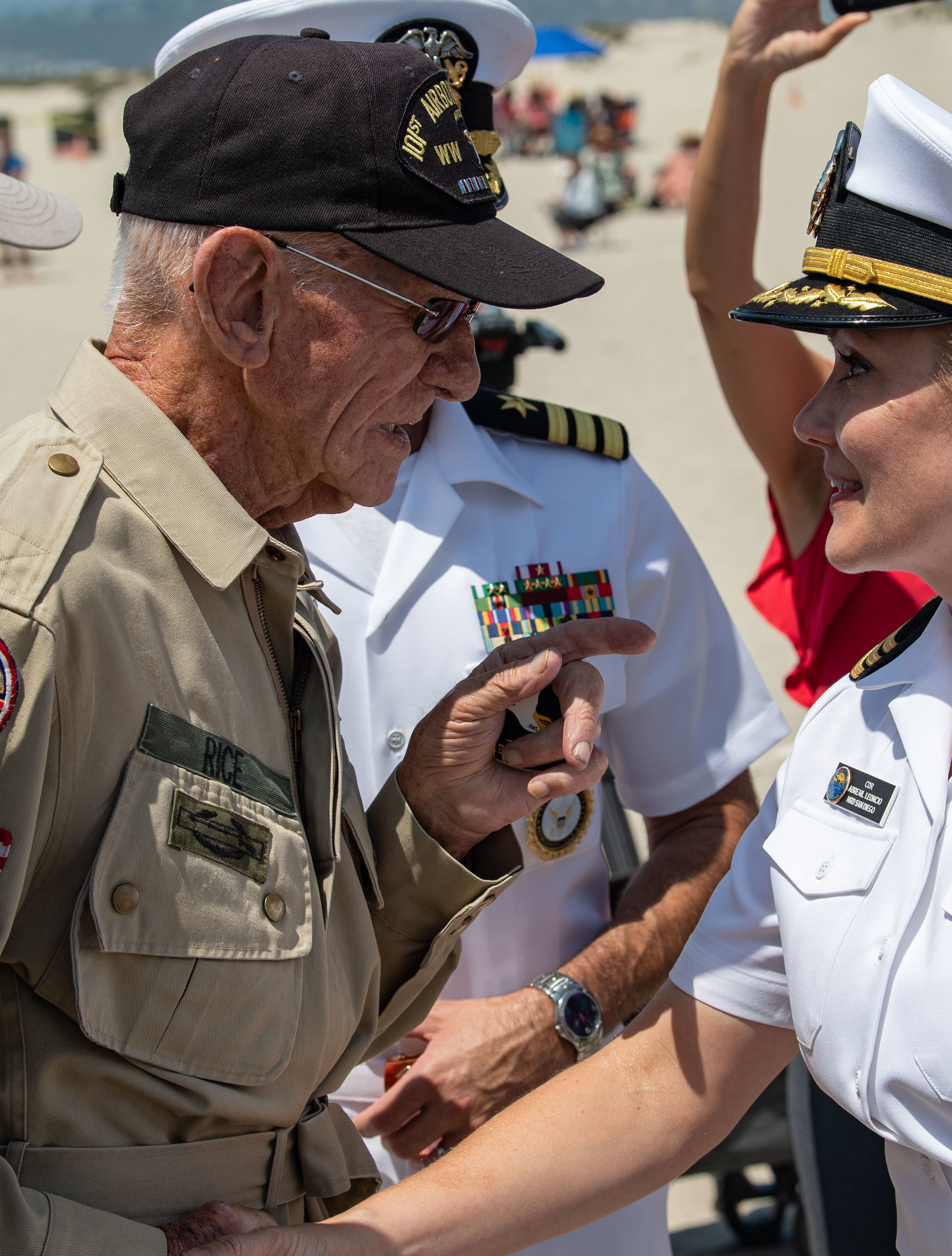
- Rice shaking hands with U.S. Navy Nurse, Cmdr. Abreail D. Leoncio in 2021
- Born: 15 August 1921; Coronado, California, United States
- Died: 17 November 2022 (aged 101) Coronado, California, United States
- Spouses: Doris Rice; Barbara Rice; Brenda Rice
- Children: 5

Thomas M. Rice (15 August 1921 – 17 November 2022) was a Staff Sergeant who served in the United States Army during World War II.

== Early life ==
Tom was born on August 15, 1921, on a small wooden shack that his father, Marcus Rice built, in Coronado, California. He spent his childhood in Coronado with his parents and siblings. During the Great Depression his family passed through tough times. On May 29, 1934, Tom lost his father (Aerial Mechanic) due to a plane crash in Panama.

He graduated from the Coronado High School in 1940 (he joined the U.S. Army the same year at Fort Rosecrans) and then enrolled at the San Diego State College in 1943, being regarded there as a top tier athlete.

== Military service ==
Before enrolling at the San Diego State College, Tom Rice was present at Pearl Harbor during the attacks of 1941, this motivated him to enlist in the elite airborne parachute school.

Thomas was accepted and trained with the U.S. Airborne Jump School pioneers at Camp Toccoa, Georgia. Tom later earned the paratrooper wings at Fort Benning.

Tom then entered the 501st Parachute Infantry Regiment of the 101st Airborne Division together with people like Vincent Speranza and Colonel Howard R. Johnson, this brought him to serve as a platoon sergeant and command 12 paratroopers until he jumped on June 6, 1944, over Normandy for Operation Overlord and Operation Market Garden.

Tom was injured even before he reached the ground, but regardless of his injuries, he fought for a total of 336 days in the Battle of Bastogne and the Battle of the Bulge, conquering of Berchtesgaden at the takeover of the Kehlsteinhaus. He was injured a total of 4 times during the time he spent in the battlefield.

== Life after the war ==
Tom was honorably discharged on December 21, 1945, and soon after he resumed his studies at the San Diego State College and married Doris Rice. He was a teacher at that same school, where he taught social sciences and history for nearly 44 years, teaching notable people like Donnie Edwards. Tom flew back to Normandy to do parachute stunts in commemoration of the 50th and later the 75th anniversary of D-Day, repeating it after in the Netherlands.

== Personal life ==
Rice is father of five children and has married a total of three times. His mother, Katherine died on February 26, 1973. He is remembered as a hero by the inhabitants of Bastogne.

He wrote his memoirs, named Trial by Combat: A Paratrooper of the 101st Airborne Remembers Division the 1944 Battle of Normandy in 2004.

To celebrate his 100th birthday, in August 2021, he went skydiving over his town in Coronado, California.

== Death ==
On November 17, 2022, at 12:33 am, local time, Tom Rice died of natural causes, aged 101 at his home in Coronado.

His wife, Brenda, stated that "Tom had an amazing life. The first 100 years were easy, but the last one was tough".

Rice's memorial service happened on December 3, 2022, at the Graham Memorial Presbyterian Church in Coronado. He was buried at the Fort Rosecrans National Cemetery.

== Awards and decorations ==
- Purple Heart with two Oak Leaf Clusters
- Invasion Arrows (2x)
- Combat Infantry Badge
- Bronze Star with Cluster
- Good Conduct Medal
- French Fourragère
- Belgian Fourragère
- Parachutist Badge
- WWII Victory Medal
