= Oreana, Idaho =

Unincorporated community in the state of Idaho, United States

- Unincorporated community
- Location within Idaho Location within the United States
- Coordinates: 43°03′13″N 116°23′42″W
- Country: United States
- State: Idaho
- County: Owyhee
- Elevation: 2,815 ft (858 m)
- Time zone: UTC-7 (Mountain (MST))
  - Summer (DST): UTC-6 (MDT)
- Area codes: 208, 986
- GNIS feature ID: 396985

Oreana is an unincorporated community in Owyhee County, Idaho, United States. Oreana is 13.7 miles (22.0 km) southeast of Murphy.

Our Lady, Queen of Heaven Church, which is listed on the National Register of Historic Places, is located near Oreana.
