= Rush Week =

- 1991 video poster
- Directed by: Bob Bralver
- Written by: Russell V. Manzatt; Michael W. Leighton
- Produced by: Michael W. Leighton
- Starring: Pamela Ludwig; Dean Hamilton; Roy Thinnes
- Cinematography: Jeff Mart
- Edited by: Jeffrey Reiner; Ned Truslow
- Music by: Joel Hamilton; Mariel Hamilton
- Production company: Noble Entertainment
- Distributed by: Alpine Releasing Group; RCA/Columbia
- Release date: 1989
- Running time: 96 minutes
- Country: United States
- Language: English

Rush Week is a 1989 American slasher film directed by Bob Bralver and starring Pamela Ludwig, Dean Hamilton, and Roy Thinnes. Its plot follows a sorority member investigating a series of underreported missing persons cases on her college campus.

== Plot ==
Toni Daniels, an ambitious journalism major at Tambler College, is assigned to do a cover story on the campus's rush week. Toni begins interviewing various members of the fraternities, as well as Dean Grail. Meanwhile, student Julie McGuffin disappears after participating in a nude modeling session, held clandestinely in the university science building. Toni soon learns of Julie's disappearance, and begins to secretly investigate the case. Shortly after, Alma Gifford, a student who works as an escort, flees from the Beta Delta Beta fraternity after a prank, and is pursued by a cloaked killer wielding an axe. The killer chases her into the woods, eventually hacking her to death.

Meanwhile, Toni questions Julie's roommate, Sarah, and learns that Julie used to model for an unnamed man who paid her significant amounts of money. Sarah tells Toni that Julie met the man through Alma, who has also gone missing. Toni confronts Jeff Jacobs, the head of Beta Delta Beta, about Alma's disappearance, though he insists Alma fled the fraternity but that he could not find her. Jeff soon begins to romance Toni, and she agrees to go on a picnic with him.

Jeff's friend Byron warns Toni that Jeff has not been the same since his former girlfriend, the Dean's daughter, was murdered and dismembered in the campus science building the previous year. Later, Toni is approached by Arnold Krangen, a chef in the campus cafeteria who offers her money to pose for him—the hundred-dollar bill he shows her bears an emblem of a double-sided axe, which Toni also observed on bills left behind by Julie in her dormitory. Toni presumes Arnold is responsible for Julie's and Alma's disappearances, and breaks into his house, where she finds a cache of pornographic photos Arnold has collected of female students. She confronts Dean Grail with the evidence, who dismisses Arnold as a sexual deviant, but does not believe him to be a killer.

On the night of the rush week's culminating celebratory bash, Toni learns that another student, Rebecca Winters, has also vanished after apparently meeting a man in the science building. Toni phones Jeff's fraternity and asks Byron to relay the message that Jeff meet her in the science building; she also calls Arnold, and pretends to take him up on his modeling offer. He also agrees to meet her in the science building. Toni also tries to summon police to the science building, believing she can prove that Arnold is the killer, but the officers dismiss her call as a prank involving the fraternity.

Toni waits inside the science building for Arnold. Unbeknownst to her, Arnold arrives and is killed by the cloaked assailant with an axe. Toni is confronted by Jeff, dressed in a cloak and mask, and assumes him to be the killer, until another masked assailant, dressed identically to Jeff, also appears—it is Dean Grail, who reveals himself to be the killer, whose motive has been to "purify" the campus of its "sinful" women who have been modeling nude for Arnold; Dean Grail's first victim was his own daughter. A fight ensues between Dean Grail and Jeff, ultimately ending in Jeff decapitating him.

== Cast ==
- Pamela Ludwig as Toni Daniels
- Dean Hamilton as Jeff Jacobs
- Roy Thinnes as Dean Grail
- Donald Grant as Byron Rogers
- Courtney Gebhart as Jonelle Watson
- John Donovan as Arnold Krangen
- David Denney as Greg Ochs
- Todd Eric Andrews as Harvan
- Laura Burkett as Rebecca Winters
- Jay Pickett as Parker
- Edward Rayden as Ichabod
- Mark Clayman as Gordo
- Toni Lee as Alma Gifford
- Kathleen Kinmont as Julie Anne McGuffin
- Heidi Holicker as Sarah
- Gregg Allman as Cosmo Kincald
- Dominick Brascia as Peeper

== Release ==
Rush Week was released on home video in 1991 by RCA/Columbia Pictures Home Entertainment.

=== Critical response ===
A review in the Variety television and film guide called Rush Week a "slasher film long on pretty girls and short on gore. It's a belated direct-to-vid release. Durable if cornball format has coeds being killed on a college campus during the frats' annual rush week ceremonies... Bralver seems more intent on satisfying voyeurs."

Michael Weldon in The Psychotronic Video Guide (1996) called the film "another stupid, boring teen/horror movie." In his book Legacy of Blood: A Comprehensive Guide to Slasher Movies (2004), film historian Jim Harper noted: "Although running several years too late to catch the slasher craze, Rush Week is a fairly honorable attempt to rehash the past."

== Sources ==
- Harper, Jim (2004). Legacy of Blood: A Comprehensive Guide to Slasher Movies. United Kingdom: Critical Vision. ISBN 978-1-900-48639-2.
- Singer, Michael (2001). Film Directors. Lone Eagle Pub. ISBN 978-1-580-65030-4.
- Weldon, Michael (1996). The Psychotronic Video Guide To Film. Macmillan. ISBN 978-0-312-13149-4.
