= List of unnumbered minor planets: 2000 U–Y =

This is a partial list of unnumbered minor planets for principal provisional designations assigned between 16 October and 31 December 2000. As of May 2026, a total of 116 bodies remain unnumbered for this period. Objects for this year are listed on the following pages: A–E · F–O · P–R · S–T and U–Y. Also see previous and next year.

| Near-Earth obj. | MBA (inner) | MBA (outer) | Centaur |
| Mars-crosser | MBA (middle) | Jupiter trojan | Trans-Neptunian obj. |
| Unclassified |

== U ==
| U | Designation | Class | Physical | | Observations | | | | Description and notes | Ref |
| U | Designation | Class | H | D | Opp. | Arc | Last | Used | Description and notes | Ref |
|---|---|---|---|---|---|---|---|---|---|---|
| 1 | 2000 UK11 | ATE | 25.3 | 31 m | multiple | 2000–2015 | 12 Sep 2015 | 66 | Disc.: LINEAR | MPC; JPL |
| 1 | 2000 UD14 | MBA-I | 19.4 | 390 m | multiple | 2000–2019 | 22 Aug 2019 | 41 | Disc.: Spacewatch; Alt.: 2016 TL83 | MPC; JPL |
| 1 | 2000 UQ16 | MCA | 20.75 | 190 m | multiple | 2000-2024 | 01 Oct 2024 | 50 | Disc.: Spacewatch | MPC; JPL |
| 7 | 2000 UR16 | ATE | 23.9 | 59 m | single | 33 days | 01 Dec 2000 | 63 | Disc.: Ondřejov Obs. | MPC; JPL |
| E | 2000 UH30 | MCA | 18.3 | 650 m | single | 2 days | 02 Nov 2000 | 15 | Disc.: LINEAR | MPC; JPL |
| 0 | 2000 UO30 | APO | 23.9 | 59 m | multiple | 2000–2017 | 16 Nov 2017 | 83 | Disc.: LINEAR | MPC; JPL |
| 6 | 2000 UQ30 | APO | 22.1 | 140 m | single | 52 days | 22 Dec 2000 | 46 | Disc.: LINEAR | MPC; JPL |
| 0 | 2000 UV31 | MBA-I | 18.8 | 520 m | multiple | 2000–2020 | 02 Feb 2020 | 43 | Disc.: Spacewatch | MPC; JPL |
| 3 | 2000 UY33 | AMO | 22.3 | 120 m | multiple | 2000–2013 | 04 May 2013 | 52 | Disc.: LINEAR | MPC; JPL |
| 0 | 2000 UO115 | MBA-I | 19.0 | 470 m | multiple | 2000–2019 | 04 Jul 2019 | 50 | Disc.: Spacewatch | MPC; JPL |
| 0 | 2000 UB116 | MBA-I | 18.9 | 490 m | multiple | 2000–2019 | 01 Nov 2019 | 55 | Disc.: Spacewatch | MPC; JPL |
| 0 | 2000 UF116 | MBA-M | 18.5 | 840 m | multiple | 2000–2019 | 25 Jan 2019 | 35 | Disc.: Astrovirtel | MPC; JPL |
| 0 | 2000 UJ116 | MBA-I | 19.38 | 400 m | multiple | 2000–2021 | 31 Aug 2021 | 48 | Disc.: Spacewatch | MPC; JPL |

back to top

== V ==
| U | Designation | Class | Physical | | Observations | | | | Description and notes | Ref |
| U | Designation | Class | H | D | Opp. | Arc | Last | Used | Description and notes | Ref |
|---|---|---|---|---|---|---|---|---|---|---|
| 0 | 2000 VP2 | MBA-M | 18.08 | 720 m | multiple | 2000–2022 | 27 Jan 2022 | 42 | Disc.: Ondřejov Obs. Alt.: 2014 ES35 | MPC; JPL |
| 0 | 2000 VU38 | MBA-I | 19.1 | 450 m | multiple | 2000–2020 | 25 Jan 2020 | 33 | Disc.: Spacewatch; Added on 22 July 2020 | MPC; JPL |
| – | 2000 VZ44 | APO | 21.0 | 220 m | single | 4 days | 05 Nov 2000 | 12 | Disc.: LINEAR | MPC; JPL |
| 0 | 2000 VZ65 | MBA-I | 19.1 | 450 m | multiple | 2000–2017 | 24 Oct 2017 | 36 | Disc.: Spacewatch | MPC; JPL |
| 2 | 2000 VB66 | MBA-M | 18.4 | 880 m | multiple | 2000–2013 | 03 Dec 2013 | 20 | Disc.: Spacewatch | MPC; JPL |
| 1 | 2000 VJ66 | MBA-I | 18.68 | 620 m | multiple | 2000–2023 | 07 Sep 2023 | 36 | Disc.: Spacewatch | MPC; JPL |
| 0 | 2000 VN66 | MBA-I | 18.65 | 550 m | multiple | 2000–2021 | 09 May 2021 | 50 | Disc.: Spacewatch | MPC; JPL |

back to top

== W ==
| U | Designation | Class | Physical | | Observations | | | | Description and notes | Ref |
| U | Designation | Class | H | D | Opp. | Arc | Last | Used | Description and notes | Ref |
|---|---|---|---|---|---|---|---|---|---|---|
| 2 | 2000 WC1 | ATE | 22.57 | 130 m | multiple | 2000–2025 | 08 Feb 2025 | 62 | Disc.: LINEAR | MPC; JPL |
| 0 | 2000 WL1 | MCA | 19.20 | 610 m | multiple | 2000–2021 | 09 Dec 2021 | 171 | Disc.: Spacewatch | MPC; JPL |
| 2 | 2000 WW2 | MCA | 17.73 | 1 km | multiple | 2000–2014 | 06 May 2014 | 63 | Disc.: LINEAR; Alt.: 2003 WV42 | MPC; JPL |
| 0 | 2000 WM6 | MCA | 20.01 | 340 m | multiple | 2000-2026 | 10 Nov 2026 | 44 | Disc.: LONEOS | MPC; JPL |
| 7 | 2000 WG10 | APO | 23.4 | 74 m | single | 5 days | 23 Nov 2000 | 37 | Disc.: LINEAR | MPC; JPL |
| – | 2000 WH10 | APO | 22.5 | 110 m | single | 4 days | 23 Nov 2000 | 23 | Disc.: LINEAR | MPC; JPL |
| 5 | 2000 WM10 | AMO | 25.8 | 25 m | single | 15 days | 05 Dec 2000 | 22 | Disc.: LINEAR | MPC; JPL |
| 4 | 2000 WV12 | TNO | 6.89 | 160 km | multiple | 2000–2024 | 09 Jan 2024 | 26 | Disc.: La Silla Obs. LoUTNOs, cubewano (cold) | MPC; JPL |
| 7 | 2000 WW12 | TNO | 7.6 | 114 km | multiple | 2000–2001 | 12 Dec 2001 | 13 | Disc.: La Silla Obs. LoUTNOs, SDO | MPC; JPL |
| E | 2000 WX12 | TNO | 7.6 | 104 km | single | 24 days | 18 Dec 2000 | 9 | Disc.: La Silla Obs. LoUTNOs, cubewano? | MPC; JPL |
| 1 | 2000 WJ13 | MBA-M | 17.19 | 1.4 km | multiple | 2000–2024 | 15 Jun 2024 | 47 | Disc.: LINEAR; Alt.: 2004 UW | MPC; JPL |
| 0 | 2000 WR19 | MCA | 17.61 | 1.15 km | multiple | 2000–2023 | 15 Feb 2023 | 290 | Disc.: LINEAR | MPC; JPL |
| 0 | 2000 WM20 | MBA-M | 18.82 | 720 m | multiple | 2000–2021 | 13 Sep 2021 | 68 | Disc.: Spacewatch; Alt.: 2013 YS134 | MPC; JPL |
| 1 | 2000 WU27 | MBA-M | 18.5 | 840 m | multiple | 2000–2023 | 15 Jan 2023 | 39 | Disc.: Spacewatch | MPC; JPL |
| 0 | 2000 WD28 | MBA-O | 17.2 | 2.0 km | multiple | 2000–2019 | 06 Apr 2019 | 34 | Disc.: Spacewatch; Added on 5 November 2021 | MPC; JPL |
| E | 2000 WP28 | MBA-M | 18.7 | 540 m | single | 4 days | 27 Nov 2000 | 11 | Disc.: LONEOS | MPC; JPL |
| 9 | 2000 WS28 | APO | 23.4 | 74 m | single | 3 days | 23 Nov 2000 | 11 | Disc.: LINEAR | MPC; JPL |
| 6 | 2000 WT28 | APO | 24.5 | 45 m | single | 65 days | 24 Jan 2001 | 12 | Disc.: LINEAR; AMO at MPC | MPC; JPL |
| 1 | 2000 WX28 | AMO | 21.32 | 230 m | multiple | 2000-2024 | 01 Sep 2024 | 49 | Disc.: AMOS | MPC; JPL |
| 0 | 2000 WY29 | HUN | 19.90 | 310 m | multiple | 2000–2021 | 08 Jun 2021 | 39 | Disc.: Spacewatch | MPC; JPL |
| 0 | 2000 WZ51 | MBA-I | 18.58 | 570 m | multiple | 2000–2021 | 07 Oct 2021 | 50 | Disc.: Spacewatch; Added on 9 March 2021 | MPC; JPL |
| 2 | 2000 WZ52 | MBA-O | 17.67 | 1.6 km | multiple | 2000–2021 | 30 Oct 2021 | 51 | Disc.: Spacewatch | MPC; JPL |
| 0 | 2000 WA53 | MBA-M | 18.32 | 910 m | multiple | 2000–2021 | 08 Aug 2021 | 27 | Disc.: Spacewatch; Alt.: 2013 WU75 | MPC; JPL |
| 0 | 2000 WQ53 | MBA-O | 17.61 | 1.7 km | multiple | 2000–2021 | 28 Nov 2021 | 54 | Disc.: Spacewatch; Alt.: 2005 VM22 | MPC; JPL |
| 1 | 2000 WS53 | MBA-I | 19.30 | 410 m | multiple | 2000–2021 | 09 Nov 2021 | 65 | Disc.: Spacewatch; Alt.: 2007 VO236 | MPC; JPL |
| 6 | 2000 WG63 | APO | 23.2 | 81 m | single | 16 days | 12 Dec 2000 | 47 | Disc.: LINEAR; AMO at MPC | MPC; JPL |
| 5 | 2000 WH63 | AMO | 21.7 | 160 m | single | 59 days | 24 Jan 2001 | 44 | Disc.: LINEAR | MPC; JPL |
| 0 | 2000 WJ63 | AMO | 21.07 | 230 m | multiple | 2000-2025 | 02 Mar 2025 | 100 | Disc.: LINEAR | MPC; JPL |
| 1 | 2000 WE105 | MBA-M | 18.76 | 750 m | multiple | 2000–2022 | 26 Nov 2022 | 21 | Disc.: Spacewatch | MPC; JPL |
| 5 | 2000 WJ107 | APO | 23.8 | 62 m | single | 24 days | 20 Dec 2000 | 33 | Disc.: LINEAR | MPC; JPL |
| 5 | 2000 WL107 | APO | 24.8 | 39 m | single | 21 days | 20 Dec 2000 | 155 | Disc.: LINEAR; AMO at MPC | MPC; JPL |
| 0 | 2000 WM107 | APO | 18.7 | 650 m | multiple | 2000–2021 | 08 Jan 2021 | 131 | Disc.: LINEAR | MPC; JPL |
| 2 | 2000 WM147 | MBA-I | 18.96 | 480 m | multiple | 2000–2020 | 14 Dec 2020 | 30 | Disc.: Spacewatch; Added on 11 May 2021 | MPC; JPL |
| 2 | 2000 WN148 | AMO | 23.14 | 120 m | multiple | 2000-2014 | 23 May 2014 | 27 | Disc.: LINEAR | MPC; JPL |
| 7 | 2000 WQ148 | APO | 22.7 | 100 m | single | 12 days | 12 Dec 2000 | 48 | Disc.: LINEAR | MPC; JPL |
| 1 | 2000 WB170 | MBA-M | 17.99 | 1.1 km | multiple | 2000–2021 | 03 Dec 2021 | 49 | Disc.: Spacewatch | MPC; JPL |
| 0 | 2000 WX177 | MBA-I | 17.9 | 780 m | multiple | 2000–2020 | 06 Oct 2020 | 43 | Disc.: Spacewatch; Added on 11 May 2021 | MPC; JPL |
| 3 | 2000 WL183 | TNO | 7.6 | 100 km | multiple | 2000–2020 | 14 Nov 2020 | 20 | Disc.: La Silla Obs. LoUTNOs, cubewano (cold) | MPC; JPL |
| 4 | 2000 WM183 | TNO | 7.19 | 188 km | multiple | 2000–2022 | 26 Dec 2022 | 24 | Disc.: La Silla Obs. LoUTNOs, cubewano (hot) | MPC; JPL |
| 5 | 2000 WN183 | TNO | 7.0 | 132 km | multiple | 2000–2006 | 20 Oct 2006 | 16 | Disc.: La Silla Obs. LoUTNOs, cubewano (cold) | MPC; JPL |
| 4 | 2000 WO183 | TNO | 7.46 | 107 km | multiple | 2000–2021 | 01 Dec 2021 | 26 | Disc.: La Silla Obs. LoUTNOs, cubewano (cold) | MPC; JPL |
| 3 | 2000 WA187 | HIL | 17.56 | 1.6 km | multiple | 2000-2024 | 22 Dec 2024 | 18 | Disc.: Mauna Kea Obs. | MPC; JPL |
| 0 | 2000 WQ193 | MBA-O | 17.45 | 1.8 km | multiple | 2000-2025 | 21 Mar 2025 | 56 | Disc.: Kitt Peak; Alt.: 2000 YO141 | MPC; JPL |
| 0 | 2000 WV193 | MBA-I | 19.18 | 470 m | multiple | 2000-2025 | 29 Aug 2025 | 35 | Disc.: Kitt Peak | MPC; JPL |
| – | 2000 WE194 | JT | 15.6 | 4.2 km | single | 2 days | 26 Nov 2000 | 25 | Disc.: Kitt Peak; Greek camp (L4) | MPC; JPL |
| 0 | 2000 WF194 | MBA-O | 17.5 | 1.7 km | multiple | 2000-2022 | 07 Apr 2022 | 49 | Disc.: Kitt Peak | MPC; JPL |
| 0 | 2000 WN194 | MBA-O | 17.45 | 1.8 km | multiple | 2000–2021 | 07 Nov 2021 | 44 | Disc.: Kitt Peak; Added on 5 November 2021; Alt.: 2021 QY48 | MPC; JPL |
| 0 | 2000 WP194 | MBA-I | 19.3 | 410 m | multiple | 2000–2021 | 04 Jan 2021 | 66 | Disc.: Whipple Obs. Added on 21 August 2021; Alt.: 2013 RN1 | MPC; JPL |
| 1 | 2000 WP195 | MBA-O | 17.5 | 1.8 km | multiple | 2000–2016 | 21 Oct 2016 | 32 | Disc.: Spacewatch; Alt.: 2011 WP123 | MPC; JPL |
| 0 | 2000 WM198 | MBA-M | 18.34 | 900 m | multiple | 2000–2021 | 06 Jul 2021 | 30 | Disc.: Spacewatch; Added on 11 May 2021; Alt.: 2017 UK85 | MPC; JPL |
| 1 | 2000 WG200 | MBA-M | 17.6 | 1.3 km | multiple | 2000–2019 | 12 Jan 2019 | 52 | Disc.: Spacewatch | MPC; JPL |
| 1 | 2000 WL200 | MBA-O | 16.7 | 2.5 km | multiple | 2000–2019 | 08 Feb 2019 | 55 | Disc.: Spacewatch | MPC; JPL |
| 2 | 2000 WX201 | MBA-I | 19.0 | 470 m | multiple | 2000–2017 | 24 Nov 2017 | 35 | Disc.: Spacewatch | MPC; JPL |
| 1 | 2000 WY201 | MBA-O | 17.4 | 1.8 km | multiple | 2000–2017 | 26 Oct 2017 | 28 | Disc.: SDSS | MPC; JPL |
| 1 | 2000 WE202 | MBA-M | 18.7 | 760 m | multiple | 2000–2017 | 25 Jul 2017 | 27 | Disc.: Spacewatch | MPC; JPL |
| 1 | 2000 WG202 | MBA-O | 17.87 | 1.5 km | multiple | 2000–2021 | 11 Oct 2021 | 51 | Disc.: Spacewatch | MPC; JPL |
| 3 | 2000 WU203 | MBA-M | 18.3 | 650 m | multiple | 2000–2020 | 05 Nov 2020 | 52 | Disc.: Spacewatch | MPC; JPL |
| 0 | 2000 WE204 | MBA-I | 18.3 | 650 m | multiple | 2000–2019 | 27 Oct 2019 | 42 | Disc.: Spacewatch | MPC; JPL |
| 0 | 2000 WK204 | MBA-M | 18.3 | 920 m | multiple | 2000–2020 | 27 Apr 2020 | 35 | Disc.: Spacewatch | MPC; JPL |
| 0 | 2000 WU204 | MBA-O | 17.47 | 1.8 km | multiple | 2000–2021 | 10 Sep 2021 | 41 | Disc.: Spacewatch | MPC; JPL |

back to top

== X ==
| U | Designation | Class | Physical | | Observations | | | | Description and notes | Ref |
| U | Designation | Class | H | D | Opp. | Arc | Last | Used | Description and notes | Ref |
|---|---|---|---|---|---|---|---|---|---|---|
| 2 | 2000 XL | MBA-M | 19.1 | 450 m | multiple | 2000–2020 | 22 Sep 2020 | 41 | Disc.: Spacewatch; Added on 22 July 2020; Alt.: 2004 VF127, 2012 TH144 | MPC; JPL |
| 1 | 2000 XN | MBA-M | 18.44 | 860 m | multiple | 2000–2021 | 07 Nov 2021 | 54 | Disc.: Spacewatch; Alt.: 2017 VB8 | MPC; JPL |
| 0 | 2000 XO8 | MBA-O | 16.4 | 2.9 km | multiple | 2000–2018 | 14 Feb 2018 | 457 | Disc.: LINEAR; MCA at MPC | MPC; JPL |
| 0 | 2000 XX10 | MBA-I | 17.62 | 890 m | multiple | 1996–2021 | 19 Mar 2021 | 189 | Disc.: Xinglong Station; Alt.: 1996 SN4, 2014 HL15, 2015 QK10 | MPC; JPL |
| 6 | 2000 XF44 | AMO | 21.3 | 200 m | single | 26 days | 30 Dec 2000 | 31 | Disc.: AMOS | MPC; JPL |
| 3 | 2000 XJ44 | APO | 20.2 | 320 m | multiple | 2000–2019 | 18 Apr 2019 | 45 | Disc.: LINEAR | MPC; JPL |
| 0 | 2000 XA54 | MBA-I | 19.9 | 310 m | multiple | 2000–2020 | 15 Sep 2020 | 27 | Disc.: Bohyunsan Obs. | MPC; JPL |
| 0 | 2000 XD56 | MBA-I | 18.6 | 570 m | multiple | 2000–2020 | 21 Jan 2020 | 34 | Disc.: Spacewatch | MPC; JPL |
| 1 | 2000 XL56 | MBA-M | 17.8 | 820 m | multiple | 2000–2020 | 16 Jun 2020 | 30 | Disc.: Spacewatch | MPC; JPL |
| 2 | 2000 XM56 | MBA-M | 17.5 | 1.8 km | multiple | 2000–2018 | 11 Nov 2018 | 42 | Disc.: Catalina Station | MPC; JPL |

back to top

== Y ==
| U | Designation | Class | Physical | | Observations | | | | Description and notes | Ref |
| U | Designation | Class | H | D | Opp. | Arc | Last | Used | Description and notes | Ref |
|---|---|---|---|---|---|---|---|---|---|---|
| 0 | 2000 YA | APO | 23.7 | 65 m | multiple | 2000–2011 | 27 Dec 2011 | 166 | Disc.: LONEOS | MPC; JPL |
| 4 | 2000 YV1 | TNO | 7.24 | 118 km | multiple | 2000–2020 | 09 Dec 2020 | 23 | Disc.: Kitt Peak; LoUTNOs, cubewano (cold) | MPC; JPL |
| E | 2000 YW1 | TNO | 7.0 | 137 km | single | 2 days | 18 Dec 2000 | 5 | Disc.: Kitt Peak; LoUTNOs, cubewano? | MPC; JPL |
| 4 | 2000 YX1 | TNO | 7.06 | 129 km | multiple | 2000–2021 | 11 Jan 2021 | 22 | Disc.: Kitt Peak; LoUTNOs, cubewano (cold) | MPC; JPL |
| 7 | 2000 YY1 | TNO | 7.1 | 212 km | multiple | 2000–2001 | 13 Dec 2001 | 10 | Disc.: Kitt Peak; LoUTNOs, centaur | MPC; JPL |
| E | 2000 YZ1 | TNO | 7.9 | 90 km | multiple | 2000–2001 | 09 Nov 2001 | 9 | Disc.: Kitt Peak; LoUTNOs, cubewano? | MPC; JPL |
| 4 | 2000 YA2 | TNO | 7.0 | 132 km | multiple | 2000–2013 | 06 Nov 2013 | 18 | Disc.: Kitt Peak; LoUTNOs, cubewano (cold) | MPC; JPL |
| E | 2000 YD2 | TNO | 7.9 | 109 km | single | 1 day | 18 Dec 2000 | 4 | Disc.: Kitt Peak; LoUTNOs, other TNO | MPC; JPL |
| 5 | 2000 YE2 | TNO | 8.26 | 81 km | multiple | 2000–2021 | 11 Jan 2021 | 15 | Disc.: Kitt Peak; LoUTNOs, twotino | MPC; JPL |
| 3 | 2000 YF2 | TNO | 7.0 | 132 km | multiple | 2000–2016 | 04 Feb 2016 | 22 | Disc.: Kitt Peak; LoUTNOs, cubewano (cold) | MPC; JPL |
| E | 2000 YG2 | TNO | 7.7 | 120 km | single | 1 day | 18 Dec 2000 | 4 | Disc.: Kitt Peak; LoUTNOs, other TNO | MPC; JPL |
| – | 2000 YF4 | HUN | 21.9 | 120 m | single | 5 days | 22 Dec 2000 | 8 | Disc.: Mauna Kea Obs. | MPC; JPL |
| 0 | 2000 YG4 | AMO | 20.98 | 250 m | multiple | 2000-2023 | 04 Dec 2023 | 142 | Disc.: Spacewatch | MPC; JPL |
| 0 | 2000 YJ4 | MCA | 18.35 | 920 m | multiple | 2000–2023 | 16 May 2023 | 83 | Disc.: LINEAR; Alt.: 2013 YD21 | MPC; JPL |
| 2 | 2000 YL4 | MCA | 19.0 | 470 m | multiple | 1996–2009 | 17 Mar 2009 | 90 | Disc.: LINEAR | MPC; JPL |
| 1 | 2000 YY16 | MBA-M | 17.2 | 1.1 km | multiple | 2000–2021 | 02 Dec 2021 | 43 | Disc.: LINEAR | MPC; JPL |
| E | 2000 YB29 | TNO | 7.9 | 124 km | single | 11 days | 01 Jan 2001 | 6 | Disc.: Mauna Kea Obs. LoUTNOs, plutino?, BR-mag: 1.50 | MPC; JPL |
| 0 | 2000 YG29 | APO | 18.7 | 650 m | multiple | 2000–2018 | 09 May 2018 | 197 | Disc.: LONEOS; Potentially hazardous object AMO at MPC | MPC; JPL |
| 1 | 2000 YS134 | ATE | 24.02 | 60 m | multiple | 2000-2024 | 03 Feb 2024 | 55 | Disc.: LINEAR | MPC; JPL; 4 |
| 1 | 2000 YT134 | AMO | 18.7 | 650 m | multiple | 2000–2007 | 09 Mar 2007 | 89 | Disc.: LONEOS | MPC; JPL |
| 0 | 2000 YW140 | MBA-O | 17.1 | 2.1 km | multiple | 2000–2021 | 08 Nov 2021 | 43 | Disc.: Kitt Peak; Added on 24 December 2021 | MPC; JPL |
| E | 2000 YN141 | HIL | 17.6 | 1.7 km | single | 2 days | 22 Dec 2000 | 14 | Disc.: Kitt Peak | MPC; JPL |
| 0 | 2000 YU141 | MBA-O | 17.7 | 1.6 km | multiple | 2000–2020 | 02 Feb 2020 | 52 | Disc.: Kitt Peak; Added on 22 July 2020 | MPC; JPL |
| E | 2000 YQ142 | TNO | 7.6 | 143 km | single | 2 days | 24 Dec 2000 | 5 | Disc.: Mauna Kea Obs. LoUTNOs, plutino? | MPC; JPL |
| E | 2000 YY142 | TNO | 7.3 | 119 km | single | 1 day | 24 Dec 2000 | 3 | Disc.: Mauna Kea Obs. LoUTNOs, cubewano? | MPC; JPL |
| 0 | 2000 YN146 | MBA-I | 18.0 | 750 m | multiple | 2000–2019 | 28 Nov 2019 | 43 | Disc.: Kitt Peak | MPC; JPL |
| 0 | 2000 YR146 | MBA-I | 18.8 | 520 m | multiple | 2000–2019 | 24 Dec 2019 | 35 | Disc.: Spacewatch | MPC; JPL |

back to top
