= List of unnumbered minor planets: 2000 S–T =

This is a partial list of unnumbered minor planets for principal provisional designations assigned between 16 September and 15 October 2000. As of May 2026, a total of 128 bodies remain unnumbered for this period. Objects for this year are listed on the following pages: A–E · F–O · P–R · S–T and U–Y. Also see previous and next year.

Near-Earth obj.	MBA (inner)	MBA (outer)	Centaur
Mars-crosser	MBA (middle)	Jupiter trojan	Trans-Neptunian obj.
Unclassified

== S ==
U	Designation	Class	Physical		Observations				Description and notes	Ref
U	Designation	Class	H	D	Opp.	Arc	Last	Used	Description and notes	Ref
1	2000 SP	MBA-I	19.12	440 m	multiple	2000–2024	10 Aug 2024	55	Disc.: Spacewatch; Alt.: 2014 UD156	MPC · JPL
0	2000 SX2	MCA	19.02	470 m	multiple	1993–2021	11 Jul 2021	44	Disc.: AMOS; Alt.: 2014 MN46	MPC · JPL
–	2000 SR7	MCA	21.6	140 m	single	4 days	26 Sep 2000	9	Disc.: Spacewatch	MPC · JPL
2	2000 SV7	MBA-I	19.7	340 m	multiple	2000–2020	11 Dec 2020	47	Disc.: Spacewatch; Added on 22 July 2020	MPC · JPL
6	2000 SE8	APO	23.0	89 m	single	72 days	01 Dec 2000	36	Disc.: AMOS; AMO at MPC	MPC · JPL
1	2000 SF8	AMO	20.3	310 m	multiple	2000–2017	09 Oct 2017	99	Disc.: LINEAR	MPC · JPL
0	2000 SG8	APO	17.73	1 km	multiple	2000–2023	04 Sep 2023	121	Disc.: LONEOS; NEO larger than 1 kilometer	MPC · JPL
1	2000 SJ8	AMO	19.8	390 m	multiple	2000–2013	27 Oct 2013	68	Disc.: LINEAR	MPC · JPL
3	2000 SM9	MBA-M	17.7	860 m	multiple	2000–2012	05 Aug 2012	41	Disc.: LINEAR; Alt.: 2004 RA340	MPC · JPL
0	2000 SD10	MCA	18.02	660 m	multiple	2000-2026	19 Jan 2026	98	Disc.: LINEAR	MPC · JPL
5	2000 SL10	APO	21.9	150 m	single	69 days	01 Dec 2000	38	Disc.: LINEAR; Potentially hazardous object	MPC · JPL
1	2000 SM10	APO	24.1	54 m	multiple	2000–2015	29 Sep 2015	184	Disc.: LINEAR; Alt.: 2015 RF2	MPC · JPL
4	2000 SN10	AMO	21.1	210 m	single	61 days	23 Nov 2000	72	Disc.: LINEAR	MPC · JPL
0	2000 SS20	MCA	19.29	430 m	multiple	2000–2026	07 Jul 2026	92	Disc.: LONEOS	MPC · JPL
4	2000 SU20	AMO	19.8	390 m	single	88 days	20 Dec 2000	30	Disc.: LONEOS	MPC · JPL
1	2000 SD24	MCA	20.66	260 m	multiple	2000-2025	22 Feb 2025	32	Disc.: LINEAR	MPC · JPL
1	2000 SB25	AMO	20.57	280 m	multiple	2000–2024	14 Feb 2024	48	Disc.: LINEAR	MPC · JPL
1	2000 SR43	AMO	19.4	470 m	multiple	2000–2004	23 Sep 2004	53	Disc.: LONEOS	MPC · JPL
7	2000 SS43	AMO	24.8	39 m	single	66 days	01 Dec 2000	26	Disc.: LINEAR	MPC · JPL
0	2000 SZ44	AMO	20.59	290 m	multiple	2000–2019	19 Sep 2019	59	Disc.: AMOS	MPC · JPL
8	2000 SB45	APO	24.5	45 m	single	3 days	29 Sep 2000	18	Disc.: LINEAR	MPC · JPL
0	2000 SE77	MBA-M	18.32	900 m	multiple	2000-2025	23 Feb 2025	115	Disc.: LINEAR; Added on 21 August 2021	MPC · JPL
1	2000 SX131	MBA-M	17.4	1.4 km	multiple	2000–2019	14 Jan 2019	50	Disc.: LINEAR; Alt.: 2017 ON33	MPC · JPL
1	2000 SL134	MCA	18.47	620 m	multiple	2000-2023	20 Nov 2023	42	Disc.: LINEAR	MPC · JPL
8	2000 SZ162	ATE	27.3	12 m	single	8 days	07 Oct 2000	30	Disc.: Spacewatch	MPC · JPL
2	2000 SU163	MBA-M	17.8	1.2 km	multiple	2000–2017	23 Nov 2017	61	Disc.: LINEAR; Alt.: 2017 OF49	MPC · JPL
2	2000 SW163	MBA-M	17.6	1.7 km	multiple	2000–2020	17 Feb 2020	61	Disc.: LINEAR; Alt.: 2009 UX85	MPC · JPL
0	2000 SV180	MCA	19.0	520 m	multiple	2000–2024	10 Dec 2024	180	Disc.: LINEAR	MPC · JPL
1	2000 SX200	MBA-I	18.6	570 m	multiple	2000–2020	17 Sep 2020	48	Disc.: LINEAR; Added on 17 January 2021	MPC · JPL
1	2000 ST214	MBA-O	18.22	1.1 km	multiple	2000-2022	14 Oct 2022	59	Disc.: LINEAR	MPC · JPL
2	2000 SH215	MCA	19.3	410 m	multiple	2000–2020	06 Dec 2020	100	Disc.: LINEAR; Alt.: 2010 RV145	MPC · JPL
0	2000 SG232	MCA	18.08	1.1 km	multiple	2000-2026	08 Mar 2026	68	Disc.: LINEAR	MPC · JPL
5	2000 SC241	AMO	20.2	320 m	single	83 days	22 Dec 2000	19	Disc.: LINEAR	MPC · JPL
0	2000 SZ299	MCA	18.86	500 m	multiple	2000–2021	09 Dec 2021	77	Disc.: LINEAR; Alt.: 2007 TA78, 2015 AE208	MPC · JPL
0	2000 SX308	MCA	18.61	800 m	multiple	2000–2021	20 Nov 2021	225	Disc.: LINEAR; Alt.: 2021 OM1	MPC · JPL
0	2000 SU314	CEN	15.43	4.0 km	multiple	2000-2022	23 Dec 2022	133	Disc.: LINEAR; Alt.: 2022 KV25 Added on 21 August 2021	MPC · JPL
0	2000 SQ325	MBA-M	17.4	1.8 km	multiple	2000–2020	24 Jan 2020	109	Disc.: Spacewatch	MPC · JPL
0	2000 SN330	MBA-I	18.5	590 m	multiple	2000–2018	13 Aug 2018	40	Disc.: Spacewatch; Alt.: 2018 PA26	MPC · JPL
E	2000 SB331	TNO	7.7	99 km	single	1 day	24 Sep 2000	6	Disc.: Mauna Kea Obs. LoUTNOs, cubewano?	MPC · JPL
E	2000 SC331	TNO	7.9	90 km	single	1 day	24 Sep 2000	6	Disc.: Mauna Kea Obs. LoUTNOs, cubewano?	MPC · JPL
E	2000 SD331	TNO	7.5	109 km	single	1 day	24 Sep 2000	6	Disc.: Mauna Kea Obs. LoUTNOs, cubewano?	MPC · JPL
E	2000 SE331	TNO	7.9	90 km	single	1 day	24 Sep 2000	6	Disc.: Mauna Kea Obs. LoUTNOs, cubewano?	MPC · JPL
E	2000 SF331	TNO	7.4	114 km	single	65 days	27 Nov 2000	9	Disc.: Mauna Kea Obs. LoUTNOs, cubewano?	MPC · JPL
E	2000 SG331	TNO	7.8	95 km	single	1 day	24 Sep 2000	6	Disc.: Mauna Kea Obs. LoUTNOs, cubewano?	MPC · JPL
E	2000 SH331	TNO	7.7	99 km	single	1 day	24 Sep 2000	6	Disc.: Mauna Kea Obs. LoUTNOs, cubewano?	MPC · JPL
E	2000 SJ331	TNO	8.3	75 km	single	1 day	24 Sep 2000	5	Disc.: Mauna Kea Obs. LoUTNOs, cubewano?	MPC · JPL
E	2000 SK331	TNO	7.9	90 km	multiple	2000–2001	15 Nov 2001	10	Disc.: Mauna Kea Obs. LoUTNOs, cubewano?	MPC · JPL
E	2000 SL331	TNO	8.2	79 km	single	1 day	24 Sep 2000	5	Disc.: Mauna Kea Obs. LoUTNOs, cubewano?	MPC · JPL
E	2000 SM331	TNO	9.0	60 km	single	1 day	24 Sep 2000	6	Disc.: Mauna Kea Obs. LoUTNOs, SDO	MPC · JPL
E	2000 SO331	TNO	8.3	75 km	single	1 day	24 Sep 2000	6	Disc.: Mauna Kea Obs. LoUTNOs, cubewano?	MPC · JPL
E	2000 SP331	TNO	8.1	82 km	single	1 day	24 Sep 2000	6	Disc.: Mauna Kea Obs. LoUTNOs, cubewano?	MPC · JPL
E	2000 SQ331	TNO	10.7	40 km	single	1 day	24 Sep 2000	6	Disc.: Mauna Kea Obs. LoUTNOs, centaur	MPC · JPL
3	2000 SR331	TNO	8.74	65 km	multiple	2000–2021	01 Dec 2021	26	Disc.: Mauna Kea Obs. LoUTNOs, res · 2:5	MPC · JPL
E	2000 SS331	TNO	9.5	48 km	single	1 day	24 Sep 2000	6	Disc.: Mauna Kea Obs. LoUTNOs, SDO	MPC · JPL
E	2000 ST331	TNO	8.7	62 km	multiple	2000–2001	15 Nov 2001	10	Disc.: Mauna Kea Obs. LoUTNOs, cubewano?	MPC · JPL
E	2000 SU331	TNO	9.5	48 km	single	1 day	24 Sep 2000	6	Disc.: Mauna Kea Obs. LoUTNOs, SDO	MPC · JPL
3	2000 SY331	MBA-O	18.1	1.3 km	multiple	2000–2021	18 Jul 2021	19	Disc.: Mauna Kea Obs. Added on 21 August 2021	MPC · JPL
1	2000 SZ338	MBA-I	18.7	540 m	multiple	2000–2019	05 Jul 2019	29	Disc.: Spacewatch; Alt.: 2008 UN357	MPC · JPL
4	2000 SG344	ATE	24.7	41 m	multiple	1999–2000	03 Oct 2000	31	Disc.: Mauna Kea Obs.	MPC · JPL
0	2000 SL345	MBA-I	18.88	520 m	multiple	2000–2023	21 Aug 2023	35	Disc.: Kitt Peak	MPC · JPL
0	2000 SS345	MBA-M	18.68	550 m	multiple	2000–2021	26 Nov 2021	34	Disc.: Kitt Peak; Added on 17 June 2021	MPC · JPL
–	2000 SP366	MBA-M	17.8	820 m	single	8 days	01 Oct 2000	12	Disc.: LONEOS	MPC · JPL
E	2000 SW370	TNO	8.5	68 km	single	1 day	24 Sep 2000	6	Disc.: Mauna Kea Obs. LoUTNOs, cubewano?	MPC · JPL
E	2000 SX370	TNO	8.2	95 km	single	1 day	24 Sep 2000	6	Disc.: Mauna Kea Obs. LoUTNOs, other TNO	MPC · JPL
3	2000 SY370	TNO	8.0	83 km	multiple	1999–2019	04 Sep 2019	18	Disc.: Mauna Kea Obs. LoUTNOs, cubewano (cold)	MPC · JPL
0	2000 SX372	MBA-O	17.38	1.9 km	multiple	2000–2021	28 Jul 2021	30	Disc.: SDSS; Added on 22 July 2020	MPC · JPL
0	2000 SY372	MBA-I	18.3	650 m	multiple	2000–2020	24 Dec 2020	27	Disc.: SDSS; Added on 22 July 2020	MPC · JPL
0	2000 SM373	MBA-I	18.7	540 m	multiple	2000–2019	04 Nov 2019	34	Disc.: SDSS; Added on 22 July 2020	MPC · JPL
0	2000 SR373	MBA-I	18.89	500 m	multiple	2000–2021	11 Jul 2021	46	Disc.: SDSS	MPC · JPL
1	2000 SW373	MBA-I	19.20	430 m	multiple	2000–2021	28 Nov 2021	70	Disc.: SDSS; Alt.: 2014 QG332	MPC · JPL
1	2000 SY373	MBA-I	19.4	390 m	multiple	2000–2019	24 Aug 2019	40	Disc.: SDSS	MPC · JPL
0	2000 SO376	MBA-I	18.87	500 m	multiple	2000–2021	12 Jun 2021	47	Disc.: Spacewatch; Added on 17 June 2021	MPC · JPL
1	2000 SQ380	MBA-M	18.2	960 m	multiple	2000–2017	13 Nov 2017	43	Disc.: Spacewatch	MPC · JPL
0	2000 SV380	MBA-I	18.97	480 m	multiple	2000–2021	11 Nov 2021	82	Disc.: Spacewatch	MPC · JPL
0	2000 SH381	MBA-O	16.9	2.3 km	multiple	2000–2017	13 Dec 2017	40	Disc.: SDSS	MPC · JPL
0	2000 SS381	HUN	19.25	420 m	multiple	2000–2021	28 Sep 2021	36	Disc.: Spacewatch	MPC · JPL
0	2000 ST381	MBA-O	17.0	2.2 km	multiple	2000–2019	08 Jan 2019	24	Disc.: SDSS	MPC · JPL
0	2000 SX381	MBA-M	17.53	1.3 km	multiple	2000–2021	16 May 2021	65	Disc.: Spacewatch	MPC · JPL
0	2000 SW383	MBA-M	18.0	1.1 km	multiple	2000–2019	04 Jan 2019	34	Disc.: SDSS	MPC · JPL
0	2000 SA384	MBA-I	18.8	520 m	multiple	2000–2020	08 Dec 2020	46	Disc.: Spacewatch	MPC · JPL
0	2000 SD384	MBA-I	18.3	650 m	multiple	2000–2020	15 Jun 2020	31	Disc.: SDSS	MPC · JPL
2	2000 SG384	MBA-I	19.2	430 m	multiple	2000–2018	11 Nov 2018	30	Disc.: Spacewatch	MPC · JPL
0	2000 SH384	MCA	19.8	460 m	multiple	2000–2021	30 Sep 2021	32	Disc.: Spacewatch	MPC · JPL
0	2000 SN384	MBA-M	18.5	840 m	multiple	2000–2019	05 Feb 2019	54	Disc.: Kitt Peak	MPC · JPL
0	2000 SY384	MBA-I	18.8	520 m	multiple	2000–2019	05 Nov 2019	41	Disc.: Kitt Peak	MPC · JPL
1	2000 SB385	MBA-I	18.75	530 m	multiple	2000–2019	03 Dec 2019	40	Disc.: Kitt Peak	MPC · JPL
0	2000 SC385	MBA-I	19.05	460 m	multiple	2000–2021	09 Nov 2021	49	Disc.: Kitt Peak	MPC · JPL
0	2000 SD385	MBA-I	19.2	430 m	multiple	2000–2019	05 Aug 2019	35	Disc.: Kitt Peak	MPC · JPL
0	2000 SF385	MBA-M	18.2	960 m	multiple	2000–2019	08 Feb 2019	30	Disc.: Kitt Peak	MPC · JPL
0	2000 SH385	MBA-I	19.4	390 m	multiple	2000–2020	13 Sep 2020	59	Disc.: Kitt Peak	MPC · JPL
1	2000 SV385	MBA-M	18.3	1.2 km	multiple	2000–2018	01 Nov 2018	41	Disc.: Kitt Peak	MPC · JPL
0	2000 SM386	MBA-O	17.14	2.1 km	multiple	2000–2021	11 Oct 2021	53	Disc.: SDSS	MPC · JPL
1	2000 SP386	MBA-M	19.01	660 m	multiple	2000–2021	05 Sep 2021	29	Disc.: Spacewatch	MPC · JPL
2	2000 ST386	MBA-I	19.2	430 m	multiple	2000–2019	02 Nov 2019	27	Disc.: Spacewatch; Added on 17 January 2021	MPC · JPL
3	2000 SV386	MBA-M	18.8	730 m	multiple	2000–2017	26 Oct 2017	21	Disc.: Spacewatch; Added on 21 August 2021	MPC · JPL
1	2000 SZ386	MBA-M	17.9	1.5 km	multiple	2000–2018	07 Sep 2018	30	Disc.: Spacewatch; Added on 29 January 2022	MPC · JPL

back to top

== T ==
U	Designation	Class	Physical		Observations				Description and notes	Ref
U	Designation	Class	H	D	Opp.	Arc	Last	Used	Description and notes	Ref
1	2000 TC1	MBA-O	16.99	2.1 km	multiple	2000-2024	24 Dec 2024	60	Disc.: LINEAR	MPC · JPL
1	2000 TH1	AMO	22.6	110 m	multiple	2000–2014	26 Oct 2014	122	Disc.: LINEAR	MPC · JPL
0	2000 TL1	APO	23.5	71 m	multiple	2000–2017	15 Oct 2017	42	Disc.: LINEAR	MPC · JPL
4	2000 TE2	AMO	24.9	37 m	single	67 days	01 Dec 2000	21	Disc.: LINEAR	MPC · JPL
2	2000 TF2	MCA	20.3	260 m	multiple	2000–2013	28 Oct 2013	61	Disc.: LINEAR; Alt.: 2013 SM19	MPC · JPL
2	2000 TS9	MBA-M	18.11	1.3 km	multiple	2000–2022	21 Jul 2022	46	Disc.: LINEAR; Added on 22 July 2020; Alt.: 2018 VQ69	MPC · JPL
0	2000 TH14	MCA	19.678	340 m	multiple	2000-2023	04 Oct 2023	54	Disc.: LINEAR	MPC · JPL
2	2000 TU28	APO	21.1	210 m	multiple	2000–2020	06 Nov 2020	250	Disc.: LINEAR; Potentially hazardous object	MPC · JPL
1	2000 TV28	AMO	21.6	170 m	multiple	2000–2020	18 Dec 2020	56	Disc.: Spacewatch	MPC · JPL
0	2000 TE30	MBA-M	18.48	850 m	multiple	2000–2021	27 Oct 2021	47	Disc.: Spacewatch	MPC · JPL
0	2000 TA32	MBA-O	18.05	1.4 km	multiple	2000–2021	03 Oct 2021	36	Disc.: Spacewatch; Added on 30 September 2021	MPC · JPL
2	2000 TF32	MBA-M	18.9	490 m	multiple	2000–2020	15 Sep 2020	62	Disc.: Spacewatch	MPC · JPL
0	2000 TP32	MBA-M	18.50	840 m	multiple	2000–2021	03 Oct 2021	64	Disc.: Spacewatch	MPC · JPL
0	2000 TL72	MBA-M	18.24	1.3 km	multiple	2000–2020	21 Jan 2020	26	Disc.: SDSS; Added on 24 December 2021	MPC · JPL
3	2000 TU72	MBA-M	19.1	640 m	multiple	2000–2017	25 Oct 2017	23	Disc.: SDSS	MPC · JPL
0	2000 TV72	MBA-I	18.7	540 m	multiple	2000–2020	24 Jan 2020	30	Disc.: SDSS	MPC · JPL
2	2000 TJ78	MBA-O	17.4	1.8 km	multiple	2000–2020	14 Dec 2020	53	Disc.: SDSS	MPC · JPL
0	2000 TR78	MBA-M	18.16	980 m	multiple	2000–2021	07 Sep 2021	36	Disc.: SDSS	MPC · JPL
0	2000 TU78	MBA-I	18.8	520 m	multiple	2000–2019	24 Aug 2019	27	Disc.: SDSS	MPC · JPL
1	2000 TG80	MCA	19.1	450 m	multiple	2000–2019	28 Nov 2019	48	Disc.: Spacewatch	MPC · JPL
0	2000 TM80	MBA-I	19.3	410 m	multiple	2000–2019	26 Oct 2019	32	Disc.: SDSS	MPC · JPL
0	2000 TP80	MBA-M	18.37	630 m	multiple	2000–2022	25 Jan 2022	38	Disc.: SDSS	MPC · JPL
0	2000 TQ80	MBA-M	17.49	1.3 km	multiple	2000–2022	03 Nov 2022	42	Disc.: Spacewatch	MPC · JPL
1	2000 TR80	MBA-I	18.2	680 m	multiple	2000–2019	20 Dec 2019	41	Disc.: SDSS	MPC · JPL
0	2000 TH81	MBA-I	18.78	520 m	multiple	2000–2021	30 Apr 2021	49	Disc.: SDSS	MPC · JPL
0	2000 TJ81	MBA-I	19.0	470 m	multiple	2000–2021	15 Jan 2021	45	Disc.: SDSS	MPC · JPL
0	2000 TO81	MBA-O	17.3	1.9 km	multiple	2000–2018	11 Feb 2018	33	Disc.: SDSS	MPC · JPL
0	2000 TZ81	MBA-I	18.6	570 m	multiple	2000–2019	25 Oct 2019	41	Disc.: SDSS	MPC · JPL
1	2000 TC82	MBA-I	18.8	520 m	multiple	2000–2018	11 Aug 2018	26	Disc.: Spacewatch	MPC · JPL
0	2000 TG82	MBA-M	17.8	1.2 km	multiple	2000–2018	15 Dec 2018	28	Disc.: No observations Added on 19 October 2020	MPC · JPL
1	2000 TH82	MBA-M	18.16	980 m	multiple	2000–2022	02 Oct 2022	61	Disc.: LONEOS; Added on 21 August 2021	MPC · JPL
0	2000 TK82	MBA-M	18.1	1.3 km	multiple	2000–2020	26 Jan 2020	26	Disc.: SDSS; Added on 24 December 2021	MPC · JPL

back to top
