= List of unnumbered minor planets: 2000 F–O =

This is a partial list of unnumbered minor planets for principal provisional designations assigned between 16 March and 31 July 2000. As of May 2026, a total of 115 bodies remain unnumbered for this period. Objects for this year are listed on the following pages: A–E · F–O · P–R · S–T and U–Y. Also see previous and next year.

Near-Earth obj.	MBA (inner)	MBA (outer)	Centaur
Mars-crosser	MBA (middle)	Jupiter trojan	Trans-Neptunian obj.
Unclassified

== F ==
U	Designation	Class	Physical		Observations				Description and notes	Ref
U	Designation	Class	H	D	Opp.	Arc	Last	Used	Description and notes	Ref
0	2000 FY5	MBA-I	18.7	540 m	multiple	2000–2017	21 Sep 2017	36	Disc.: Spacewatch; Alt.: 2013 EN77	MPC; JPL
2	2000 FB8	TNO	8.2	108 km	multiple	2000–2015	23 Mar 2015	18	Disc.: Mauna Kea Obs. LoUTNOs, plutino	MPC; JPL
4	2000 FC8	TNO	8.0	83 km	multiple	2000–2015	24 Apr 2015	17	Disc.: Mauna Kea Obs. LoUTNOs, cubewano (cold)	MPC; JPL
3	2000 FH8	TNO	7.2	121 km	multiple	2000–2018	16 May 2018	21	Disc.: Mauna Kea Obs. LoUTNOs, cubewano (cold)	MPC; JPL
0	2000 FP10	AMO	20.96	220 m	multiple	2000–2023	09 Oct 2023	144	Disc.: Spacewatch	MPC; JPL
0	2000 FX13	AMO	20.08	340 m	multiple	2000–2021	09 Dec 2021	67	Disc.: LINEAR	MPC; JPL
–	2000 FO53	MBA-M	18.9	920 m	single	12 days	11 Apr 2000	9	Disc.: Spacewatch	MPC; JPL
3	2000 FR53	TNO	7.6	109 km	multiple	2000–2015	13 Apr 2015	19	Disc.: Mauna Kea Obs. LoUTNOs, res · 5:9	MPC; JPL
3	2000 FS53	TNO	7.8	92 km	multiple	1999–2015	24 Apr 2015	30	Disc.: La Silla Obs. LoUTNOs, cubewano (cold), BR-mag: 1.77; Alt.: 1999 KS16	MPC; JPL
2	2000 FT53	TNO	8.3	112 km	multiple	2000–2015	24 May 2015	17	Disc.: Mauna Kea Obs. LoUTNOs, cubewano (hot)	MPC; JPL
E	2000 FU53	TNO	8.5	68 km	single	37 days	07 May 2000	6	Disc.: Mauna Kea Obs. LoUTNOs, cubewano?	MPC; JPL
E	2000 FW53	TNO	7.2	151 km	single	6 days	06 Apr 2000	5	Disc.: Mauna Kea Obs. LoUTNOs, other TNO	MPC; JPL
9	2000 FY53	TNO	8.8	70 km	single	35 days	05 May 2000	10	Disc.: Mauna Kea Obs. LoUTNOs, plutino?	MPC; JPL
2	2000 FZ53	CEN	11.4	29 km	multiple	2000–2002	10 Apr 2002	19	Disc.: Mauna Kea Obs., BR-mag: 1.17	MPC; JPL
0	2000 FM54	MBA-M	17.88	1.5 km	multiple	2000–2022	26 Jan 2022	38	Disc.: Spacewatch; Added on 19 October 2020	MPC; JPL

back to top

== G ==
U	Designation	Class	Physical		Observations				Description and notes	Ref
U	Designation	Class	H	D	Opp.	Arc	Last	Used	Description and notes	Ref
3	2000 GA2	MCA	19.39	400 m	multiple	2000-2023	10 Dec 2023	100	Disc.: LONEOS	MPC; JPL
2	2000 GB2	APO	18.77	600 m	multiple	2000–2022	17 Sep 2022	54	Disc.: Spacewatch	MPC; JPL
2	2000 GT127	AMO	22.2	130 m	multiple	2000–2019	02 May 2019	33	Disc.: Spacewatch	MPC; JPL
0	2000 GV127	AMO	19.16	510 m	multiple	2000–2024	05 Aug 2024	253	Disc.: LINEAR	MPC; JPL
1	2000 GW127	APO	19.4	477 m	multiple	2000–2017	16 May 2017	104	Disc.: LONEOS; Alt.: 2016 QQ11	MPC; JPL
0	2000 GN132	MBA-I	18.82	540 m	multiple	2000–2025	25 Mar 2025	52	Disc.: Spacewatch	MPC; JPL
5	2000 GQ132	MBA-O	17.7	1.6 km	single	54 days	05 Jun 2000	181	Disc.: AMOS; MCA at MPC	MPC; JPL
1	2000 GM137	CEN	14.28	9.0 km	multiple	2000–2025	29 Jun 2025	34	Disc.: Mauna Kea Obs., albedo: 0.043	MPC; JPL
5	2000 GV146	TNO	7.6	100 km	multiple	2000–2022	26 Apr 2022	22	Disc.: Mauna Kea Obs. LoUTNOs, cubewano (cold)	MPC; JPL
E	2000 GW146	TNO	8.1	100 km	single	1 day	04 Apr 2000	6	Disc.: Mauna Kea Obs. LoUTNOs, other TNO	MPC; JPL
3	2000 GX146	TNO	7.8	92 km	multiple	2000–2015	23 Mar 2015	21	Disc.: Mauna Kea Obs. LoUTNOs, cubewano (cold)	MPC; JPL
3	2000 GY146	TNO	7.9	87 km	multiple	2000–2015	23 Mar 2015	17	Disc.: Mauna Kea Obs. LoUTNOs, cubewano (cold)	MPC; JPL
E	2000 GZ146	TNO	7.8	95 km	single	2 days	05 Apr 2000	6	Disc.: Mauna Kea Obs. LoUTNOs, cubewano?	MPC; JPL
1	2000 GC147	AMO	20.0	360 m	multiple	2000–2014	04 Feb 2014	53	Disc.: Mauna Kea Obs.	MPC; JPL
E	2000 GF147	TNO	8.2	79 km	single	1 day	06 Apr 2000	4	Disc.: Mauna Kea Obs. LoUTNOs, cubewano?	MPC; JPL
E	2000 GK147	TNO	9.2	55 km	single	35 days	07 May 2000	8	Disc.: Mauna Kea Obs. LoUTNOs, SDO	MPC; JPL
E	2000 GL147	TNO	8.81	78 km	single	5 days	04 May 2000	5	Disc.: Mauna Kea Obs. LoUTNOs, plutino?	MPC; JPL
E	2000 GM147	TNO	7.9	124 km	single	33 days	06 May 2000	7	Disc.: Mauna Kea Obs. LoUTNOs, plutino?	MPC; JPL
1	2000 GB184	MBA-I	19.3	410 m	multiple	2000–2019	08 May 2019	91	Disc.: Spacewatch; Alt.: 2011 CT43	MPC; JPL
1	2000 GJ189	MBA-I	18.4	620 m	multiple	2000–2020	25 Oct 2020	40	Disc.: Spacewatch; Added on 17 January 2021	MPC; JPL

back to top

== H ==
U	Designation	Class	Physical		Observations				Description and notes	Ref
U	Designation	Class	H	D	Opp.	Arc	Last	Used	Description and notes	Ref
0	2000 HT17	MBA-I	18.72	540 m	multiple	2000–2022	25 Jan 2022	35	Disc.: Spacewatch; Alt.: 2015 HB29	MPC; JPL
1	2000 HM19	MBA-I	18.7	540 m	multiple	2000–2017	28 Mar 2017	22	Disc.: Spacewatch	MPC; JPL
2	2000 HB24	ATE	23.7	65 m	multiple	2000–2017	22 Jun 2017	112	Disc.: LINEAR	MPC; JPL
3	2000 HO40	ATE	22.3	120 m	multiple	2000–2020	25 May 2020	125	Disc.: LONEOS	MPC; JPL
1	2000 HP40	AMO	23.99	56 m	multiple	2000-2022	22 Apr 2022	45	Disc.: LINEAR	MPC; JPL
2	2000 HE46	CEN	14.8	6.0 km	multiple	2000–2000	05 Dec 2000	118	Disc.: LONEOS, albedo: 0.045; BR-mag: 1.42	MPC; JPL
2	2000 HM106	MBA-I	18.6	570 m	multiple	2000–2019	06 Apr 2019	25	Disc.: Spacewatch />Added on 24 December 2021	MPC; JPL

back to top

== J ==
U	Designation	Class	Physical		Observations				Description and notes	Ref
U	Designation	Class	H	D	Opp.	Arc	Last	Used	Description and notes	Ref
–	2000 JF5	APO	21.9	150 m	single	5 days	06 May 2000	65	Disc.: LINEAR; Potentially hazardous object	MPC; JPL
8	2000 JX8	AMO	25.4	30 m	single	3 days	05 May 2000	20	Disc.: LINEAR	MPC; JPL
3	2000 JF81	TNO	7.2	121 km	multiple	2000–2014	30 May 2014	24	Disc.: La Silla Obs. LoUTNOs, cubewano (cold)	MPC; JPL
E	2000 JH81	TNO	8.8	60 km	single	2 days	08 May 2000	5	Disc.: La Silla Obs. LoUTNOs, cubewano?	MPC; JPL
0	2000 JV90	MBA-O	17.36	1.9 km	multiple	2000–2021	11 May 2021	60	Disc.: SDSS; Added on 11 May 2021	MPC; JPL
0	2000 JL91	MBA-M	18.93	720 m	multiple	2000–2026	26 Mar 2026	33	Disc.: SDSS; Added on 24 December 2021	MPC; JPL
0	2000 JJ92	MBA-O	17.4	1.8 km	multiple	2000–2021	12 May 2021	30	Disc.: SDSS; Added on 21 August 2021	MPC; JPL
0	2000 JF93	MBA-I	17.9	780 m	multiple	2000–2020	11 Dec 2020	44	Disc.: SDSS; Added on 22 July 2020	MPC; JPL
2	2000 JO96	MBA-M	18.4	880 m	multiple	2000–2021	01 Jun 2021	36	Disc.: SDSS	MPC; JPL
0	2000 JJ97	MBA-I	18.1	710 m	multiple	2000–2019	29 Jul 2019	32	Disc.: SDSS	MPC; JPL
0	2000 JL97	MBA-M	17.2	1.1 km	multiple	2000–2015	17 Jan 2015	36	Disc.: SDSS	MPC; JPL
0	2000 JM97	MBA-M	17.86	1.5 km	multiple	2000–2020	19 Oct 2020	44	Disc.: SDSS	MPC; JPL
0	2000 JO97	MBA-M	17.9	1.1 km	multiple	2000–2018	07 Sep 2018	29	Disc.: SDSS	MPC; JPL
2	2000 JU97	MBA-M	17.8	820 m	multiple	2000–2023	14 Dec 2023—	32	Disc.: SDSS	MPC; JPL
4	2000 JD98	MBA-I	18.8	520 m	multiple	2000–2021	15 Apr 2021	29	Disc.: Spacewatch; Added on 17 June 2021	MPC; JPL
0	2000 JE98	MBA-M	18.9	600 m	multiple	2000–2025	20 Feb 2025	27	Disc.: SDSS; Added on 11 May 2021	MPC; JPL

back to top

== K ==
U	Designation	Class	Physical		Observations				Description and notes	Ref
U	Designation	Class	H	D	Opp.	Arc	Last	Used	Description and notes	Ref
0	2000 KA	APO	21.7	160 m	multiple	2000–2020	21 Jun 2020	464	Disc.: LONEOS; Potentially hazardous object	MPC; JPL
1	2000 KC	AMO	20.1	340 m	multiple	2000–2017	14 Aug 2017	63	Disc.: LONEOS	MPC; JPL
3	2000 KL4	TNO	7.6	126 km	multiple	2000–2019	06 Jun 2019	23	Disc.: Kitt Peak Obs. LoUTNOs, other TNO	MPC; JPL
–	2000 KQ4	MCA	19.5	370 m	single	9 days	05 Jun 2000	14	Disc.: LINEAR	MPC; JPL
1	2000 KV8	MBA-O	16.8	2.4 km	multiple	2000–2021	09 Apr 2021	38	Disc.: LINEAR; Alt.: 2016 EH294	MPC; JPL
1	2000 KL33	AMO	19.7	410 m	multiple	2000–2003	03 May 2003	157	Disc.: LINEAR	MPC; JPL
0	2000 KE41	APO	17.44	1.2 km	multiple	2000-2021	04 May 2021	160	Disc.: LINEAR; NEO larger than 1 kilometer	MPC; JPL
2	2000 KP44	APO	19.03	560 m	multiple	2000–2021	16 May 2021	90	Disc.: LONEOS	MPC; JPL
2	2000 KP65	TNO	10.5	48 km	single	58 days	11 Jun 2000	20	Disc.: LONEOS; LoUTNOs, damocloid	MPC; JPL
9	2000 KJ84	MBA-I	19.89	310 m	single	2 days	01 Jun 2000	12	Disc.: La Palma Obs. Added on 21 August 2021	MPC; JPL
0	2000 KW84	MBA-I	18.71	590 m	multiple	2000–2023	13 Oct 2023	46	Disc.: Spacewatch	MPC; JPL

back to top

== L ==
U	Designation	Class	Physical		Observations				Description and notes	Ref
U	Designation	Class	H	D	Opp.	Arc	Last	Used	Description and notes	Ref
0	2000 LG2	MBA-I	19.1	450 m	multiple	2000–2020	28 May 2020	29	Disc.: Mauna Kea Obs. Added on 22 July 2020	MPC; JPL
0	2000 LD3	APO	19.97	430 m	multiple	2000-2026	12 Jun 2026	153	Disc.: LONEOS	MPC; JPL
0	2000 LF3	APO	21.61	170 m	multiple	2000-2025	04 Jun 2025	138	Disc.: LONEOS; Potentially hazardous object	MPC; JPL
6	2000 LG6	ATE	29.0	6 m	single	3 days	07 Jun 2000	13	Disc.: Spacewatch	MPC; JPL

back to top

== M ==
U	Designation	Class	Physical		Observations				Description and notes	Ref
U	Designation	Class	H	D	Opp.	Arc	Last	Used	Description and notes	Ref
3	2000 MO	MCA	19.06	370 m	multiple	2000-2026	18 Aug 2026	30	Disc.: Spacewatch	MPC; JPL
1	2000 MK7	MBA-M	18.10	1.3 km	multiple	2000–2022	25 Jan 2022	43	Disc.: Astrovirtel; Alt.: 2015 PH174	MPC; JPL

back to top

== N ==
U	Designation	Class	Physical		Observations				Description and notes	Ref
U	Designation	Class	H	D	Opp.	Arc	Last	Used	Description and notes	Ref
1	2000 NW3	MCA	19.33	420 m	multiple	2000-2022	19 Sep 2022	49	Disc.: Prescott Obs. Alt.: 2022 KV8	MPC; JPL
1	2000 NQ11	AMO	19.86	430 m	multiple	2000–2006	25 Nov 2006	83	Disc.: AMOS	MPC; JPL

back to top

== O ==
U	Designation	Class	Physical		Observations				Description and notes	Ref
U	Designation	Class	H	D	Opp.	Arc	Last	Used	Description and notes	Ref
0	2000 OE2	MBA-M	17.48	1.5 km	multiple	2000–2026	21 May 2026	143	Disc.: Prescott Obs.	MPC; JPL
0	2000 OX2	MBA-I	18.65	450 m	multiple	2000-2026	10 Sep 2026	42	Disc.: Mount John	MPC; JPL
0	2000 OH8	AMO	20.77	250 m	multiple	2000-2026	07 Jun 2026	98	Disc.: LINEAR	MPC; JPL
3	2000 OK8	ATE	20.2	320 m	multiple	2000–2002	28 Aug 2002	188	Disc.: LINEAR	MPC; JPL
5	2000 OB51	TNO	8.03	103 km	multiple	1999–2021	08 Aug 2021	21	Disc.: La Silla Obs. LoUTNOs, other TNO	MPC; JPL
2	2000 OM61	MBA-I	18.9	490 m	multiple	2000–2019	19 Dec 2019	28	Disc.: Cerro Tololo	MPC; JPL
1	2000 OS61	MBA-O	17.7	1.6 km	multiple	2000–2017	29 Sep 2017	33	Disc.: Cerro Tololo; Alt.: 2006 SJ179	MPC; JPL
1	2000 OE63	MBA-O	18.08	1.3 km	multiple	2000–2023	10 Dec 2023	30	Disc.: Cerro Tololo	MPC; JPL
2	2000 ON64	MBA-O	18.67	1.0 km	multiple	2000–2021	08 Sep 2021	26	Disc.: Cerro Tololo; Added on 30 September 2021	MPC; JPL
1	2000 OV64	MBA-O	17.82	1.5 km	multiple	2000-2023	05 Nov 2023	44	Disc.: Cerro Tololo; Alt.: 2012 UU259	MPC; JPL
0	2000 OM65	MBA-I	18.91	490 m	multiple	2000–2021	13 Sep 2021	45	Disc.: Cerro Tololo; Alt.: 2014 QR144	MPC; JPL
0	2000 OS65	MBA-I	18.3	650 m	multiple	2000–2019	02 Nov 2019	25	Disc.: Cerro Tololo	MPC; JPL
2	2000 OQ66	MBA-O	17.6	1.7 km	multiple	2000–2017	17 Aug 2017	21	Disc.: Cerro Tololo; Added on 22 July 2020; Alt.: 2016 GX276	MPC; JPL
4	2000 OH67	TNO	6.61	245 km	multiple	2000–2021	08 Aug 2021	29	Disc.: Cerro Tololo; LoUTNOs, cubewano (hot)	MPC; JPL
3	2000 OP67	TNO	7.49	115 km	multiple	2000–2021	03 Oct 2021	37	Disc.: Cerro Tololo; LoUTNOs, res · 4:7	MPC; JPL
0	2000 OY70	MBA-I	19.21	430 m	multiple	2000–2021	13 Sep 2021	43	Disc.: Cerro Tololo	MPC; JPL
1	2000 OZ70	MBA-I	19.5	370 m	multiple	2000–2019	05 Aug 2019	52	Disc.: Cerro Tololo	MPC; JPL
0	2000 OD71	MBA-M	17.3	1.5 km	multiple	2000–2021	23 Jan 2021	41	Disc.: Cerro Tololo	MPC; JPL
0	2000 OF71	MCA	19.2	430 m	multiple	2000–2016	29 Jun 2016	32	Disc.: Cerro Tololo	MPC; JPL
0	2000 OS71	MBA-I	18.7	540 m	multiple	2000–2019	23 Sep 2019	56	Disc.: Cerro Tololo	MPC; JPL
1	2000 OU71	MBA-I	18.6	570 m	multiple	2000–2019	02 Nov 2019	48	Disc.: Cerro Tololo	MPC; JPL
0	2000 OZ71	MBA-I	18.4	620 m	multiple	2000–2018	12 Jul 2018	38	Disc.: Spacewatch	MPC; JPL
1	2000 OF72	MBA-I	19.3	410 m	multiple	2000–2019	25 Oct 2019	35	Disc.: Cerro Tololo	MPC; JPL
0	2000 OG72	MBA-I	18.6	570 m	multiple	2000–2017	25 Apr 2017	27	Disc.: Cerro Tololo	MPC; JPL
0	2000 OS72	MBA-I	19.3	410 m	multiple	2000–2019	28 Aug 2019	27	Disc.: Cerro Tololo	MPC; JPL
1	2000 OW72	MBA-O	17.03	2.2 km	multiple	2000–2023	05 Sep 2023	43	Disc.: Cerro Tololo	MPC; JPL
0	2000 OX72	MBA-O	17.4	1.8 km	multiple	2000–2019	04 Feb 2019	30	Disc.: Cerro Tololo	MPC; JPL
2	2000 OY72	MBA-O	17.81	1.6 km	multiple	2000–2023	21 Aug 2023	28	Disc.: Cerro Tololo	MPC; JPL
0	2000 OZ72	MBA-M	18.0	1.4 km	multiple	2000–2019	26 Sep 2019	31	Disc.: Cerro Tololo	MPC; JPL
0	2000 OA73	MBA-O	17.7	1.6 km	multiple	2000–2017	14 Dec 2017	35	Disc.: Cerro Tololo	MPC; JPL
0	2000 OK73	MBA-O	17.4	1.8 km	multiple	2000–2019	02 Jan 2019	36	Disc.: Cerro Tololo	MPC; JPL
1	2000 OM73	MBA-I	19.3	410 m	multiple	2000–2019	26 Sep 2019	32	Disc.: Cerro Tololo	MPC; JPL
1	2000 OQ73	MBA-I	19.15	450 m	multiple	2000–2022	01 Nov 2022	46	Disc.: Cerro Tololo; Added on 22 July 2020	MPC; JPL
3	2000 OV73	MBA-O	18.1	1.3 km	multiple	2000–2020	28 Feb 2020	23	Disc.: Cerro Tololo; Added on 9 March 2021	MPC; JPL
2	2000 OW73	MBA-O	17.61	1.7 km	multiple	2000–2021	09 May 2021	27	Disc.: Cerro Tololo; Added on 11 May 2021	MPC; JPL
0	2000 OY73	MBA-O	17.54	1.7 km	multiple	2000–2021	27 Oct 2021	43	Disc.: Cerro Tololo; Added on 30 September 2021	MPC; JPL
2	2000 OZ73	MBA-O	18.3	1.2 km	multiple	2000–2017	08 Dec 2017	23	Disc.: Cerro Tololo; Added on 5 November 2021	MPC; JPL
0	2000 OA74	MBA-O	17.7	1.6 km	multiple	2000–2021	11 Nov 2021	30	Disc.: Cerro Tololo; Added on 24 December 2021	MPC; JPL

back to top
