= List of unnumbered minor planets: 2000 P–R =

This is a partial list of unnumbered minor planets for principal provisional designations assigned between 1 August and 15 September 2000. As of May 2026, a total of 147 bodies remain unnumbered for this period. Objects for this year are listed on the following pages: A–E · F–O · P–R · S–T and U–Y. Also see previous and next year.

Near-Earth obj.	MBA (inner)	MBA (outer)	Centaur
Mars-crosser	MBA (middle)	Jupiter trojan	Trans-Neptunian obj.
Unclassified

== P ==
U	Designation	Class	Physical		Observations				Description and notes	Ref
U	Designation	Class	H	D	Opp.	Arc	Last	Used	Description and notes	Ref
–	2000 PN	APO	22.5	110 m	single	2 days	03 Aug 2000	22	Disc.: LINEAR	MPC · JPL
0	2000 PE3	APO	20.50	280 m	multiple	2000–2021	11 Sep 2021	134	Disc.: LINEAR	MPC · JPL
0	2000 PF5	AMO	20.47	310 m	multiple	2000-2023	20 Dec 2023	155	Disc.: LINEAR	MPC · JPL
6	2000 PY5	APO	21.1	210 m	single	31 days	02 Sep 2000	43	Disc.: LINEAR; Potentially hazardous object	MPC · JPL
1	2000 PK6	MCA	18.2	960 m	multiple	2000–2017	23 Jun 2017	48	Disc.: AMOS	MPC · JPL
7	2000 PH8	AMO	24.3	49 m	single	6 days	09 Aug 2000	22	Disc.: Spacewatch	MPC · JPL
0	2000 PL8	MCA	1.1	2.1 km	multiple	1989–2022	09 Jul 2022	122	Disc.: LINEAR; Alt.: 2011 LW19	MPC · JPL
0	2000 PN8	APO	22.04	140 m	multiple	2000–2021	17 Aug 2021	166	Disc.: AMOS	MPC · JPL
0	2000 PA13	MCA	17.21	1.5 km	multiple	2000–2021	17 Dec 2021	225	Disc.: LINEAR	MPC · JPL
1	2000 PM25	MBA-O	16.6	2.7 km	multiple	2000–2016	28 Jul 2016	29	Disc.: LINEAR	MPC · JPL
0	2000 PQ27	AMO	20.0	360 m	multiple	2000–2021	09 Jan 2021	535	Disc.: Spacewatch	MPC · JPL
5	2000 PU29	TNO	8.08	80 km	multiple	1999–2021	12 Sep 2021	19	Disc.: Mauna Kea Obs. LoUTNOs, cubewano (cold)	MPC · JPL
4	2000 PW29	TNO	8.3	73 km	multiple	1999–2001	20 Sep 2001	14	Disc.: Mauna Kea Obs. LoUTNOs, cubewano (cold)	MPC · JPL
4	2000 PX29	TNO	7.6	155 km	multiple	2000–2019	04 Sep 2019	28	Disc.: Mauna Kea Obs. LoUTNOs, cubewano (hot)	MPC · JPL
3	2000 PY29	TNO	7.3	115 km	multiple	2000–2012	11 Oct 2012	22	Disc.: Mauna Kea Obs. LoUTNOs, cubewano (cold)	MPC · JPL
E	2000 PZ29	TNO	7.5	109 km	single	1 day	06 Aug 2000	6	Disc.: Mauna Kea Obs. LoUTNOs, cubewano?	MPC · JPL
3	2000 PA30	TNO	8.0	83 km	multiple	1999–2014	03 Sep 2014	18	Disc.: Mauna Kea Obs. LoUTNOs, cubewano (cold)	MPC · JPL
E	2000 PB30	TNO	8.1	82 km	single	1 day	06 Aug 2000	6	Disc.: Mauna Kea Obs. LoUTNOs, cubewano?	MPC · JPL
3	2000 PC30	TNO	7.6	100 km	multiple	1999–2019	04 Sep 2019	24	Disc.: Mauna Kea Obs. LoUTNOs, cubewano (cold)	MPC · JPL
3	2000 PD30	TNO	7.0	132 km	multiple	1999–2014	26 Sep 2014	40	Disc.: Mauna Kea Obs. LoUTNOs, cubewano (cold)	MPC · JPL
3	2000 PF30	TNO	7.9	99 km	multiple	1999–2006	16 Apr 2006	27	Disc.: Mauna Kea Obs. LoUTNOs, SDO; Alt.: 1999 OL4	MPC · JPL
3	2000 PG30	TNO	7.7	96 km	multiple	1999–2020	21 Sep 2020	20	Disc.: Mauna Kea Obs. LoUTNOs, cubewano (cold)	MPC · JPL
2	2000 PH30	TNO	7.8	104 km	multiple	2000–2020	12 Aug 2020	23	Disc.: Mauna Kea Obs. LoUTNOs, SDO	MPC · JPL
4	2000 PL30	TNO	7.4	138 km	multiple	2000–2019	04 Sep 2019	18	Disc.: Mauna Kea Obs. LoUTNOs, other TNO	MPC · JPL
3	2000 PM30	TNO	7.9	87 km	multiple	1999–2019	04 Sep 2019	22	Disc.: Mauna Kea Obs. LoUTNOs, cubewano (cold)	MPC · JPL
3	2000 PN30	TNO	8.1	80 km	multiple	1999–2012	11 Oct 2012	24	Disc.: Mauna Kea Obs. LoUTNOs, cubewano (cold)	MPC · JPL
6	2000 PQ30	TNO	8.6	63 km	multiple	2000–2015	28 May 2015	11	Disc.: La Silla Obs. LoUTNOs, cubewano (cold)	MPC · JPL
E	2000 PR30	TNO	8.1	82 km	single	1 day	08 Aug 2000	6	Disc.: La Silla Obs. LoUTNOs, cubewano?	MPC · JPL
E	2000 PS30	TNO	8.8	66 km	single	1 day	08 Aug 2000	6	Disc.: La Silla Obs. LoUTNOs, SDO	MPC · JPL
1	2000 PB34	HUN	19.2	430 m	multiple	2000–2020	23 Jan 2020	33	Disc.: Cerro Tololo	MPC · JPL
1	2000 PE34	MBA-I	18.72	540 m	multiple	2000–2021	13 May 2021	64	Disc.: Cerro Tololo; Added on 19 October 2020	MPC · JPL
3	2000 PF34	MBA-I	19.6	360 m	multiple	2000–2015	23 Oct 2015	16	Disc.: Cerro Tololo; Added on 19 October 2020	MPC · JPL

back to top

== Q ==
U	Designation	Class	Physical		Observations				Description and notes	Ref
U	Designation	Class	H	D	Opp.	Arc	Last	Used	Description and notes	Ref
0	2000 QS7	APO	19.69	430 m	multiple	2000–2022	12 Jun 2022	75	Disc.: LINEAR; Potentially hazardous object	MPC · JPL
0	2000 QV7	APO	21.55	170 m	multiple	2000–2022	02 Jan 2022	177	Disc.: LINEAR; Potentially hazardous object	MPC · JPL
2	2000 QC34	MCA	18.7	1.0 km	multiple	2000–2011	27 Nov 2011	90	Disc.: LINEAR	MPC · JPL
9	2000 QX69	APO	24.2	51 m	single	5 days	02 Sep 2000	29	Disc.: LINEAR	MPC · JPL
2	2000 QD79	MBA-M	17.6	1.3 km	multiple	2000–2019	08 Jan 2019	81	Disc.: LINEAR; Alt.: 2013 PH20	MPC · JPL
1	2000 QJ130	AMO	19.4	470 m	multiple	2000–2012	16 Nov 2012	135	Disc.: LINEAR	MPC · JPL
0	2000 QL130	AMO	20.31	370 m	multiple	2000-2025	23 Jun 2025	78	Disc.: LINEAR	MPC · JPL
0	2000 QM130	MCA	19.86	380 m	multiple	2000-2025	23 Jun 2025	47	Disc.: LINEAR	MPC · JPL
4	2000 QO130	AMO	20.5	280 m	single	92 days	01 Dec 2000	71	Disc.: LINEAR	MPC · JPL
E	2000 QB226	TNO	6.6	164 km	single	1 day	30 Aug 2000	8	Disc.: La Silla Obs. LoUTNOs, cubewano?	MPC · JPL
E	2000 QD226	TNO	7.3	119 km	single	1 day	30 Aug 2000	6	Disc.: La Silla Obs. LoUTNOs, cubewano?	MPC · JPL
E	2000 QF226	TNO	8.3	75 km	single	1 day	30 Aug 2000	7	Disc.: La Silla Obs. LoUTNOs, cubewano?	MPC · JPL
E	2000 QG226	TNO	7.73	136 km	single	10 days	04 Sep 2000	11	Disc.: La Silla Obs. LoUTNOs, plutino?	MPC · JPL
2	2000 QH226	TNO	9.0	75 km	multiple	2000–2017	23 Dec 2017	43	Disc.: La Silla Obs. LoUTNOs, plutino	MPC · JPL
E	2000 QJ226	TNO	8.1	113 km	single	1 day	30 Aug 2000	7	Disc.: La Silla Obs. LoUTNOs, plutino?	MPC · JPL
E	2000 QK226	TNO	8.9	63 km	single	5 days	30 Aug 2000	9	Disc.: La Silla Obs. LoUTNOs, SDO	MPC · JPL
5	2000 QL226	TNO	8.33	87 km	multiple	2000–2019	01 Nov 2019	23	Disc.: La Silla Obs. LoUTNOs, res · 4:7; Alt.: 2013 SC113	MPC · JPL
0	2000 QU231	MBA-O	18.23	1.1 km	multiple	2001-2026	18 Aug 2026	89	Disc.: LINEAR	MPC · JPL
3	2000 QM232	MBA-O	18.25	1.2 km	multiple	2000–2015	22 Apr 2015	27	Disc.: Cerro Tololo	MPC · JPL
0	2000 QW232	MBA-I	19.59	360 m	multiple	2000-2025	24 Sep 2025	34	Disc.: Cerro Tololo	MPC · JPL
–	2000 QH233	MBA-I	19.8	330 m	single	9 days	03 Sep 2000	6	Disc.: Cerro Tololo	MPC · JPL
E	2000 QV233	JT	15.1	5.3 km	single	3 days	28 Aug 2000	6	Disc.: Cerro Tololo; Trojan camp (L5)	MPC · JPL
–	2000 QW233	MBA-O	18.6	1.1 km	single	3 days	28 Aug 2000	6	Disc.: Cerro Tololo	MPC · JPL
2	2000 QE234	MBA-M	19.23	470 m	multiple	2000–2024	28 Apr 2024	33	Disc.: Cerro Tololo; Added on 22 July 2020	MPC · JPL
0	2000 QF236	MBA-M	17.9	1.5 km	multiple	2000–2019	28 Nov 2019	27	Disc.: Cerro Tololo; Added on 22 July 2020; Alt.: 2014 SY89	MPC · JPL
1	2000 QU236	MBA-O	17.4	1.8 km	multiple	2000–2021	14 Jun 2021	21	Disc.: Cerro Tololo; Added on 21 August 2021; Alt.: 2021 JD36	MPC · JPL
1	2000 QU238	MBA-M	18.2	960 m	multiple	2000–2020	02 Feb 2020	30	Disc.: Cerro Tololo; Added on 22 July 2020	MPC · JPL
3	2000 QX238	MBA-M	18.7	540 m	multiple	2000–2020	13 Sep 2020	19	Disc.: Cerro Tololo; Added on 17 June 2021	MPC · JPL
0	2000 QZ238	MBA-I	18.5	590 m	multiple	2000–2019	26 Nov 2019	52	Disc.: Cerro Tololo; Alt.: 2011 ON3	MPC · JPL
–	2000 QN239	MBA-M	20.1	400 m	single	3 days	28 Aug 2000	6	Disc.: Cerro Tololo	MPC · JPL
1	2000 QR239	MBA-I	19.77	330 m	multiple	2000–2022	17 Aug 2022	40	Disc.: Cerro Tololo	MPC · JPL
2	2000 QK240	MBA-M	18.3	650 m	multiple	2000–2019	14 Jan 2019	34	Disc.: Cerro Tololo; Alt.: 2011 EJ109	MPC · JPL
0	2000 QN240	HUN	18.9	490 m	multiple	2000–2017	18 Nov 2017	22	Disc.: Cerro Tololo	MPC · JPL
–	2000 QU240	MBA-O	18.1	1.3 km	single	28 days	27 Aug 2000	6	Disc.: Cerro Tololo	MPC · JPL
2	2000 QT241	MBA-I	19.32	450 m	multiple	2000–2024	02 Jun 2024	61	Disc.: Cerro Tololo Obs. Added on 5 November 2021; Alt.: 2014 QU430	MPC · JPL
0	2000 QP242	MBA-M	18.35	640 m	multiple	2000–2021	03 Oct 2021	36	Disc.: Cerro Tololo	MPC · JPL
0	2000 QY242	MBA-I	18.6	570 m	multiple	2000–2019	04 Sep 2019	155	Disc.: Cerro Tololo; Alt.: 2015 PU69	MPC · JPL
0	2000 QP245	MBA-M	18.23	670 m	multiple	2000–2022	07 Jan 2022	44	Disc.: Cerro Tololo	MPC · JPL
0	2000 QK247	MBA-O	17.07	2.1 km	multiple	2000–2021	11 Oct 2021	50	Disc.: Cerro Tololo	MPC · JPL
0	2000 QF248	MCA	19.0	470 m	multiple	1997–2019	02 May 2019	34	Disc.: Cerro Tololo; Added on 9 March 2021	MPC · JPL
0	2000 QV248	MBA-M	18.41	870 m	multiple	2000–2021	02 Oct 2021	90	Disc.: Cerro Tololo	MPC · JPL
2	2000 QD249	MBA-I	20.23	270 m	multiple	2000–2023	10 Oct 2023	24	Disc.: Cerro Tololo; Added on 22 July 2020	MPC · JPL
3	2000 QN251	TNO	7.36	122 km	multiple	2000–2021	13 Sep 2021	26	Disc.: Cerro Tololo; LoUTNOs, res · 3:5, BR-mag: 1.63; taxonomy: IR-RR	MPC · JPL
E	2000 QJ252	TNO	7.6	104 km	single	24 days	25 Aug 2000	4	Disc.: Cerro Tololo; LoUTNOs, cubewano?	MPC · JPL
E	2000 QK252	TNO	6.3	189 km	single	27 days	27 Aug 2000	4	Disc.: Cerro Tololo; LoUTNOs, cubewano?	MPC · JPL
3	2000 QL252	TNO	7.6	114 km	multiple	2000–2020	20 Oct 2020	9	Disc.: Cerro Tololo; LoUTNOs, SDO; Alt.: 2006 UN321	MPC · JPL
E	2000 QN252	TNO	7.7	120 km	single	28 days	28 Aug 2000	4	Disc.: Cerro Tololo; LoUTNOs, other TNO	MPC · JPL
E	2000 QO252	TNO	7.0	137 km	single	29 days	28 Aug 2000	4	Disc.: Cerro Tololo; LoUTNOs, cubewano?	MPC · JPL
1	2000 QG253	MBA-O	17.4	1.8 km	multiple	2000–2016	03 Aug 2016	23	Disc.: Astrovirtel; Added on 21 August 2021	MPC · JPL
0	2000 QL256	MBA-I	19.0	470 m	multiple	2000–2018	13 Dec 2018	41	Disc.: Cerro Tololo	MPC · JPL
0	2000 QC257	MBA-M	18.56	580 m	multiple	2000–2021	28 Sep 2021	55	Disc.: Cerro Tololo	MPC · JPL
1	2000 QD257	MBA-I	18.9	490 m	multiple	2000–2020	13 May 2020	58	Disc.: Cerro Tololo	MPC · JPL
2	2000 QF257	MBA-I	19.8	330 m	multiple	2000–2017	22 Oct 2017	38	Disc.: Cerro Tololo	MPC · JPL
0	2000 QM257	MBA-O	16.8	2.4 km	multiple	2000–2021	15 Jan 2021	33	Disc.: Cerro Tololo	MPC · JPL
0	2000 QO257	MBA-I	18.9	490 m	multiple	2000–2020	02 Feb 2020	45	Disc.: Cerro Tololo	MPC · JPL
0	2000 QP257	MBA-O	17.0	2.2 km	multiple	2000–2018	10 Jan 2018	31	Disc.: Spacewatch	MPC · JPL
0	2000 QR257	MBA-I	18.88	500 m	multiple	2000–2021	10 Oct 2021	108	Disc.: Cerro Tololo	MPC · JPL
0	2000 QU257	MBA-M	18.3	920 m	multiple	2000–2017	16 Aug 2017	26	Disc.: Cerro Tololo	MPC · JPL
0	2000 QW257	MBA-M	17.6	1.7 km	multiple	2000–2018	05 Aug 2018	27	Disc.: Cerro Tololo	MPC · JPL
1	2000 QA258	MBA-M	17.8	1.2 km	multiple	2000–2017	14 Aug 2017	25	Disc.: Cerro Tololo	MPC · JPL
2	2000 QC258	MBA-O	17.74	1.5 km	multiple	2000–2023	22 Dec 2023	30	Disc.: Cerro Tololo	MPC · JPL
0	2000 QG258	MBA-I	18.7	540 m	multiple	2000–2019	28 Nov 2019	59	Disc.: Spacewatch	MPC · JPL
0	2000 QS258	MBA-M	18.3	920 m	multiple	2000–2019	05 Feb 2019	57	Disc.: Cerro Tololo	MPC · JPL
0	2000 QY258	MBA-I	18.5	590 m	multiple	2000–2019	03 Dec 2019	44	Disc.: Cerro Tololo	MPC · JPL
0	2000 QF259	MBA-M	18.0	1.4 km	multiple	2000–2018	08 Nov 2018	38	Disc.: Cerro Tololo	MPC · JPL
1	2000 QK259	MBA-M	17.4	1.8 km	multiple	2000–2020	26 Jan 2020	47	Disc.: Cerro Tololo	MPC · JPL
1	2000 QL259	MBA-I	18.9	490 m	multiple	2000–2019	27 Nov 2019	38	Disc.: Cerro Tololo	MPC · JPL
0	2000 QM259	MBA-I	18.4	620 m	multiple	2000–2018	11 Jul 2018	32	Disc.: Cerro Tololo	MPC · JPL
1	2000 QP259	MBA-I	18.88	500 m	multiple	2000–2021	08 Sep 2021	45	Disc.: Cerro Tololo	MPC · JPL
0	2000 QR259	MBA-M	18.3	1.2 km	multiple	2000–2019	06 Sep 2019	138	Disc.: Cerro Tololo	MPC · JPL
0	2000 QA260	MBA-I	19.0	470 m	multiple	2000–2019	07 May 2019	42	Disc.: Cerro Tololo	MPC · JPL
0	2000 QD260	MBA-I	18.8	520 m	multiple	2000–2019	03 Dec 2019	35	Disc.: Spacewatch	MPC · JPL
0	2000 QF260	MBA-O	17.7	1.6 km	multiple	2000–2019	04 Feb 2019	28	Disc.: Cerro Tololo	MPC · JPL
0	2000 QG260	MBA-O	17.6	1.7 km	multiple	2000–2019	01 Jul 2019	24	Disc.: Cerro Tololo	MPC · JPL
0	2000 QH260	MBA-I	18.2	680 m	multiple	2000–2023	14 Jul 2023	32	Disc.: Cerro Tololo	MPC · JPL
0	2000 QJ260	MBA-O	18.0	1.4 km	multiple	2000–2019	28 Aug 2019	20	Disc.: Cerro Tololo	MPC · JPL
0	2000 QK260	MBA-I	19.3	410 m	multiple	2000–2020	19 Aug 2020	30	Disc.: Cerro Tololo	MPC · JPL
0	2000 QN260	MBA-I	18.7	540 m	multiple	2000–2019	17 Dec 2019	50	Disc.: Cerro Tololo	MPC · JPL
1	2000 QO260	MBA-I	18.8	520 m	multiple	2000–2020	26 Jan 2020	39	Disc.: Cerro Tololo	MPC · JPL
0	2000 QQ260	MBA-M	19.01	480 m	multiple	2000–2022	29 Sep 2022	62	Disc.: Cerro Tololo	MPC · JPL
0	2000 QY260	MBA-I	18.8	520 m	multiple	2000–2020	24 Jan 2020	41	Disc.: Cerro Tololo	MPC · JPL
0	2000 QG261	MBA-O	17.2	2.0 km	multiple	2000–2020	21 Apr 2020	28	Disc.: Cerro Tololo	MPC · JPL
0	2000 QH261	MBA-O	17.1	2.1 km	multiple	2000–2020	19 Jan 2020	25	Disc.: Astrovirtel	MPC · JPL
1	2000 QL261	MBA-M	19.05	460 m	multiple	2000–2021	28 Nov 2021	23	Disc.: Cerro Tololo; Added on 19 October 2020	MPC · JPL
0	2000 QM261	MBA-M	18.54	820 m	multiple	1999–2021	15 Apr 2021	31	Disc.: Cerro Tololo; Added on 11 May 2021	MPC · JPL
0	2000 QO261	MBA-M	17.8	1.6 km	multiple	2000–2023	19 Sep 2023	41	Disc.: Cerro Tololo Obs. Added on 24 December 2021	MPC · JPL

back to top

== R ==
U	Designation	Class	Physical		Observations				Description and notes	Ref
U	Designation	Class	H	D	Opp.	Arc	Last	Used	Description and notes	Ref
4	2000 RJ12	AMO	22.3	120 m	single	91 days	01 Dec 2000	57	Disc.: LINEAR	MPC · JPL
–	2000 RK12	APO	21.3	200 m	single	4 days	05 Sep 2000	25	Disc.: LINEAR	MPC · JPL
1	2000 RN12	APO	20.0	360 m	multiple	2000–2008	13 Mar 2008	58	Disc.: LINEAR	MPC · JPL
1	2000 RC37	MBA-M	18.12	900 m	multiple	2000-2017	26 Dec 2017	31	Disc.: LINEAR	MPC · JPL
1	2000 RD52	AMO	20.86	260 m	multiple	2000-2023	12 Nov 2023	42	Disc.: LONEOS	MPC · JPL
2	2000 RE52	APO	22.3	149 m	multiple	2000–2010	15 Mar 2010	105	Disc.: LINEAR; Alt.: 2010 EK2	MPC · JPL
5	2000 RF52	AMO	24.0	56 m	single	87 days	01 Dec 2000	39	Disc.: LINEAR	MPC · JPL
0	2000 RO53	MCA	18.89	500 m	multiple	2000–2021	28 Nov 2021	250	Disc.: Spacewatch	MPC · JPL
6	2000 RK60	AMO	21.6	170 m	single	28 days	04 Oct 2000	69	Disc.: LINEAR	MPC · JPL
3	2000 RG75	MCA	18.4	620 m	multiple	2000–2020	08 Dec 2020	224	Disc.: LINEAR; Alt.: 2010 RE14	MPC · JPL
1	2000 RZ106	MBA-I	19.3	410 m	multiple	2000–2021	05 Jun 2021	23	Disc.: SDSS; Added on 21 August 2021; Alt.: 2021 JS42	MPC · JPL
0	2000 RE107	MBA-O	17.9	1.5 km	multiple	2000–2021	02 Oct 2021	42	Disc.: SDSS; Added on 5 November 2021; Alt.: 2016 TJ178	MPC · JPL
0	2000 RH107	MBA-I	18.1	710 m	multiple	2000–2019	25 Sep 2019	27	Disc.: SDSS; Added on 22 July 2020	MPC · JPL
0	2000 RO109	MBA-I	19.30	410 m	multiple	2000–2022	26 Jan 2022	51	Disc.: Spacewatch	MPC · JPL
0	2000 RS109	MBA-I	19.1	450 m	multiple	2000–2020	17 Jul 2020	43	Disc.: SDSS	MPC · JPL
0	2000 RF110	MBA-O	17.8	1.5 km	multiple	2000–2019	03 Jan 2019	28	Disc.: SDSS	MPC · JPL
0	2000 RH111	MBA-I	18.5	590 m	multiple	2000–2019	19 Dec 2019	46	Disc.: SDSS; Alt.: 2013 ED130	MPC · JPL
0	2000 RL111	MBA-M	18.4	1.2 km	multiple	2000–2019	02 Nov 2019	41	Disc.: SDSS	MPC · JPL
1	2000 RV111	MBA-O	18.1	1.3 km	multiple	2000–2019	29 Aug 2019	104	Disc.: SDSS	MPC · JPL
0	2000 RE112	MBA-I	18.98	480 m	multiple	2000–2021	14 Apr 2021	30	Disc.: SDSS	MPC · JPL
1	2000 RL112	MBA-O	17.4	1.8 km	multiple	2000–2017	26 Oct 2017	22	Disc.: SDSS	MPC · JPL
2	2000 RR112	MBA-M	18.0	1.4 km	multiple	2000–2018	17 Nov 2018	45	Disc.: Spacewatch	MPC · JPL
0	2000 RT112	MBA-I	17.93	770 m	multiple	2000–2021	31 Oct 2021	74	Disc.: SDSS	MPC · JPL
1	2000 RU112	MBA-I	18.5	590 m	multiple	2000–2019	03 Oct 2019	25	Disc.: SDSS	MPC · JPL
0	2000 RX112	MBA-O	17.9	1.5 km	multiple	2000–2017	26 Sep 2017	25	Disc.: SDSS; Added on 19 October 2020	MPC · JPL
2	2000 RD113	MBA-M	17.76	1.7 km	multiple	2000–2023	08 Oct 2023	61	Disc.: Spacewatch; Added on 9 March 2021	MPC · JPL
2	2000 RF113	MBA-O	17.71	1.6 km	multiple	2000–2022	20 Oct 2022	19	Disc.: SDSS; Added on 24 December 2021	MPC · JPL
0	2000 RL113	MBA-M	19.26	420 m	multiple	2000–2021	29 Nov 2021	37	Disc.: SDSS; Added on 24 December 2021	MPC · JPL
0	2000 RM113	MBA-I	18.8	520 m	multiple	2000–2021	06 Nov 2021	28	Disc.: SDSS; Added on 24 December 2021	MPC · JPL

back to top
