= List of unnumbered minor planets: 2000 A–E =

This is a partial list of unnumbered minor planets for principal provisional designations assigned between 1 January and 15 March 2000. As of May 2026, a total of 122 bodies remain unnumbered for this period. Objects for this year are listed on the following pages: A–E · F–O · P–R · S–T and U–Y. Also see previous and next year.

Near-Earth obj.	MBA (inner)	MBA (outer)	Centaur
Mars-crosser	MBA (middle)	Jupiter trojan	Trans-Neptunian obj.
Unclassified

== A ==
U	Designation	Class	Physical		Observations				Description and notes	Ref
U	Designation	Class	H	D	Opp.	Arc	Last	Used	Description and notes	Ref
0	2000 AA6	APO	22.44	316 m	multiple	2000–2019	06 Jan 2019	156	Disc.: LINEAR	MPC · JPL
0	2000 AB6	APO	22.2	130 m	multiple	2000–2011	02 Oct 2011	141	Disc.: LINEAR	MPC · JPL
6	2000 AG6	APO	25.3	31 m	single	7 days	10 Jan 2000	68	Disc.: LINEAR	MPC · JPL
0	2000 AZ54	MBA-M	18.72	1.0 km	multiple	2000–2021	08 Nov 2021	50	Disc.: Spacewatch; Alt.: 2008 YJ106	MPC · JPL
0	2000 AY93	MCA	17.85	1.6 km	multiple	1999–2023	21 Jun 2023	290	Disc.: LINEAR	MPC · JPL
0	2000 AY105	MCA	18.51	1.1 km	multiple	2000–2021	08 Sep 2021	68	Disc.: LINEAR	MPC · JPL
1	2000 AE205	APO	23.0	89 m	multiple	2000–2019	23 Jun 2019	83	Disc.: LINEAR; AMO at MPC	MPC · JPL
1	2000 AG205	AMO	19.7	955 m	multiple	2000–2014	14 May 2014	87	Disc.: Spacewatch	MPC · JPL
2	2000 AH205	APO	22.6	110 m	multiple	2000–2020	13 Jun 2020	91	Disc.: LINEAR; Alt.: 2015 HS9	MPC · JPL
0	2000 AR211	MCA	18.86	590 m	multiple	2000–2025	18 Feb 2025	88	Disc.: Spacewatch; Added on 11 May 2021; Alt.: 2020 OB83	MPC · JPL
1	2000 AO218	HUN	18.8	520 m	multiple	2000–2022	26 Jan 2022	33	Disc.: Spacewatch; Added on 29 January 2022	MPC · JPL
3	2000 AZ219	MBA-O	16.4	2.9 km	multiple	2000–2021	11 Oct 2021	20	Disc.: Spacewatch; Added on 29 January 2022	MPC · JPL
0	2000 AQ223	MBA-M	17.6	900 m	multiple	2000–2020	22 Nov 2020	37	Disc.: Spacewatch; Alt.: 2015 OY57	MPC · JPL
1	2000 AV227	HUN	19.12	450 m	multiple	2000–2022	10 Jan 2022	28	Disc.: Spacewatch; Added on 29 January 2022	MPC · JPL
0	2000 AA228	MBA-M	17.37	1.5 km	multiple	2000–2024	08 Jun 2024	61	Disc.: Spacewatch; Added on 24 December 2021	MPC · JPL
2	2000 AB229	TNO	14.0	10 km	single	64 days	09 Mar 2000	194	Disc.: LINEAR; LoUTNOs, damocloid	MPC · JPL
0	2000 AC229	MBA-O	16.8	2.4 km	multiple	2000–2017	01 Apr 2017	209	Disc.: LINEAR	MPC · JPL
0	2000 AT251	MBA-O	17.2	2.0 km	multiple	2000–2018	08 Aug 2018	33	Disc.: Spacewatch	MPC · JPL
E	2000 AB255	TNO	8.9	69 km	single	1 day	02 Jan 2000	44	Disc.: Mauna Kea Obs. LoUTNOs, other TNO	MPC · JPL
E	2000 AC255	TNO	8.9	69 km	single	1 day	02 Jan 2000	6	Disc.: Mauna Kea Obs. LoUTNOs, other TNO	MPC · JPL
E	2000 AD255	TNO	8.9	69 km	single	1 day	02 Jan 2000	18	Disc.: Mauna Kea Obs. LoUTNOs, other TNO	MPC · JPL
E	2000 AE255	TNO	8.3	91 km	single	1 day	07 Jan 2000	33	Disc.: Mauna Kea Obs. LoUTNOs, other TNO	MPC · JPL
1	2000 AF255	TNO	5.9	275 km	multiple	2000–2020	01 Feb 2020	58	Disc.: Mauna Kea Obs. LoUTNOs, other TNO, BR-mag: 1.78	MPC · JPL
2	2000 AG259	MBA-M	18.4	620 m	multiple	2000–2019	28 Nov 2019	57	Disc.: Spacewatch	MPC · JPL
0	2000 AW259	MBA-M	18.0	1.4 km	multiple	2000–2019	28 May 2019	33	Disc.: Spacewatch	MPC · JPL
0	2000 AA260	MBA-I	18.8	520 m	multiple	2000–2019	29 Oct 2019	44	Disc.: Spacewatch	MPC · JPL

back to top

== B ==
U	Designation	Class	Physical		Observations				Description and notes	Ref
U	Designation	Class	H	D	Opp.	Arc	Last	Used	Description and notes	Ref
1	2000 BL10	MBA-M	18.16	680 m	multiple	2000–2024	01 Jan 2024	82	Disc.: Spacewatch; Added on 22 July 2020	MPC · JPL
0	2000 BH19	AMO	19.71	400 m	multiple	1996–2025	31 Dec 2025	423	Disc.: LINEAR	MPC · JPL
0	2000 BK19	APO	22.1	140 m	multiple	2000–2015	18 Feb 2015	122	Disc.: LINEAR; Alt.: 2015 BU310	MPC · JPL
8	2000 BO19	APO	24.6	43 m	single	4 days	03 Feb 2000	9	Disc.: Spacewatch	MPC · JPL
1	2000 BJ38	MBA-I	18.6	570 m	multiple	2000–2014	26 Nov 2014	38	Disc.: Spacewatch; Alt.: 2000 CN148, 2008 FZ4	MPC · JPL
0	2000 BU42	MBA-M	17.40	1.8 km	multiple	2000–2021	31 Aug 2021	65	Disc.: Spacewatch; Alt.: 2013 YY89	MPC · JPL

back to top

== C ==
U	Designation	Class	Physical		Observations				Description and notes	Ref
U	Designation	Class	H	D	Opp.	Arc	Last	Used	Description and notes	Ref
1	2000 CA13	MCA	18.01	1 km	multiple	2000–2022	21 May 2022	104	Disc.: LINEAR	MPC · JPL
1	2000 CL33	AMO	18.68	780 m	multiple	1995–2026	04 Aug 2026	76	Disc.: LINEAR	MPC · JPL
0	2000 CM33	APO	21.26	200 m	multiple	2000–2020	31 Jul 2020	205	Disc.: CSS; Potentially hazardous object	MPC · JPL
0	2000 CN33	AMO	19.57	430 m	multiple	2000–2021	11 May 2021	172	Disc.: LINEAR	MPC · JPL
6	2000 CO33	APO	21.1	210 m	single	39 days	13 Mar 2000	68	Disc.: LINEAR; Potentially hazardous object AMO at MPC	MPC · JPL
0	2000 CJ59	MCA	18.07	710 m	multiple	2000–2024	18 Feb 2024	194	Disc.: LINEAR	MPC · JPL
2	2000 CK59	APO	24.1	54 m	multiple	2000–2017	16 Dec 2017	68	Disc.: LINEAR; AMO at MPC; Alt.: 2009 CU	MPC · JPL
0	2000 CM79	MBA-M	18.7	760 m	multiple	2000–2020	12 Dec 2020	49	Disc.: Spacewatch	MPC · JPL
2	2000 CU80	MBA-O	18.33	1.1 km	multiple	2000-2023	18 May 2023	31	Disc.: La Silla Obs.	MPC · JPL
0	2000 CB97	MBA-O	17.0	2.2 km	multiple	2000–2018	07 Aug 2018	50	Disc.: La Silla Obs.	MPC · JPL
0	2000 CP101	APO	19.83	370 m	multiple	2000–2026	17 Feb 2026	242	Disc.: LINEAR; Potentially hazardous object	MPC · JPL
2	2000 CL104	TNO	6.2	191 km	multiple	2000–2020	01 Feb 2020	29	Disc.: Kitt Peak; LoUTNOs, cubewano (cold), BR-mag: 1.85; taxonomy: RR	MPC · JPL
5	2000 CM104	TNO	7.8	110 km	multiple	2000-2019	08 Mar 2019	18	Disc.: Kitt Peak; LoUTNOs, cubewano?	MPC · JPL
E	2000 CN104	TNO	6.9	173 km	single	25 days	01 Mar 2000	4	Disc.: Kitt Peak; LoUTNOs, other TNO	MPC · JPL
2	2000 CO104	CEN	10.0	56 km	multiple	2000–2015	23 Mar 2015	15	Disc.: Kitt Peak	MPC · JPL
3	2000 CK105	TNO	6.1	285 km	multiple	2000–2017	03 Mar 2017	32	Disc.: Kitt Peak; LoUTNOs, plutino	MPC · JPL
3	2000 CL105	TNO	6.9	139 km	multiple	2000–2018	18 Mar 2018	29	Disc.: Kitt Peak; LoUTNOs, cubewano (cold), BR-mag: 1.52	MPC · JPL
E	2000 CP105	TNO	7.7	109 km	single	21 days	26 Feb 2000	4	Disc.: Kitt Peak; LoUTNOs, SDO	MPC · JPL
7	2000 CS105	TNO	7.88	100 km	multiple	2000-2017	23 Feb 2017	27	Disc.: Kitt Peak; LoUTNOs, cubewano?	MPC · JPL
2	2000 CU105	MBA-M	18.31	630 m	multiple	2000–2022	31 July 2022	41	Disc.: Kitt Peak Obs. Added on 24 December 2021	MPC · JPL
E	2000 CY105	TNO	6.6	164 km	single	21 days	26 Feb 2000	4	Disc.: Kitt Peak; LoUTNOs, cubewano?	MPC · JPL
0	2000 CP107	MBA-O	17.99	1.4 km	multiple	2000–2021	15 Jan 2021	40	Disc.: Kitt Peak Obs. Added on 9 March 2021; Alt.: 2020 XL12	MPC · JPL
2	2000 CN114	TNO	7.1	126 km	multiple	2000–2020	18 Feb 2020	22	Disc.: Kitt Peak; LoUTNOs, cubewano (cold)	MPC · JPL
E	2000 CO114	TNO	6.9	173 km	single	54 days	30 Mar 2000	4	Disc.: Kitt Peak; LoUTNOs, other TNO	MPC · JPL
E	2000 CP114	TNO	8.0	119 km	single	53 days	30 Mar 2000	4	Disc.: Kitt Peak; LoUTNOs, plutino?	MPC · JPL
0	2000 CH129	MBA-M	17.99	1.4 km	multiple	2000–2021	28 Nov 2021	41	Disc.: Spacewatch; Added on 30 September 2021; Alt.: 2017 WF67	MPC · JPL
1	2000 CB130	MCA	19.0	470 m	multiple	2000–2011	28 Jul 2011	83	Disc.: Spacewatch; Alt.: 2000 CB73, 2005 XB28	MPC · JPL
0	2000 CD130	MBA-O	16.4	2.9 km	multiple	2000–2019	29 Sep 2019	50	Disc.: Spacewatch	MPC · JPL
0	2000 CJ130	MBA-M	18.74	2.2 km	multiple	2000-2026	24 Mar 2026	51	Disc.: Spacewatch	MPC · JPL
0	2000 CQ131	MBA-I	18.62	560 m	multiple	2000–2021	06 Nov 2021	36	Disc.: Spacewatch; Alt.: 2015 BF564	MPC · JPL
1	2000 CK132	MCA	18.08	720 m	multiple	2000–2019	19 Sep 2019	41	Disc.: Spacewatch; Alt.: 2019 QZ6	MPC · JPL
0	2000 CV132	MBA-O	17.6	1.7 km	multiple	2000–2021	18 Jan 2021	39	Disc.: Spacewatch; Added on 22 July 2020	MPC · JPL
0	2000 CF133	MBA-M	18.3	920 m	multiple	2000–2020	11 Nov 2020	30	Disc.: Spacewatch	MPC · JPL
3	2000 CH137	MCA	19.2	430 m	multiple	2000–2020	25 Feb 2020	33	Disc.: Spacewatch; Added on 11 May 2021; Alt.: 2020 BT22	MPC · JPL
2	2000 CO139	MBA-O	17.0	2.2 km	multiple	2000–2023	26 Apr 2023	42	Disc.: Spacewatch; Added on 19 October 2020; Alt.: 2017 DG57	MPC · JPL
2	2000 CO140	MBA-M	18.0	1.3 km	multiple	2000-2018	20 Jan 2018	29	Disc.: Spacewatch	MPC · JPL
0	2000 CS142	MBA-I	18.8	570 m	multiple	2000–2024	17 Mar 2024	44	Disc.: Spacewatch	MPC · JPL
0	2000 CE152	MBA-I	18.61	560 m	multiple	2000–2021	30 Oct 2021	54	Disc.: Spacewatch	MPC · JPL
0	2000 CJ152	MBA-I	18.63	560 m	multiple	2000–2022	26 Jan 2022	50	Disc.: Kitt Peak	MPC · JPL
0	2000 CN152	JT	14.9	5.8 km	multiple	2000–2016	25 Oct 2016	33	Disc.: Kitt Peak	MPC · JPL
0	2000 CP152	MBA-M	17.87	1.5 km	multiple	2000–2021	28 Nov 2021	46	Disc.: Kitt Peak	MPC · JPL
2	2000 CZ152	MBA-M	18.3	650 m	multiple	2000–2020	22 Mar 2020	47	Disc.: Spacewatch	MPC · JPL
0	2000 CC153	MBA-I	19.10	450 m	multiple	2000–2021	07 Sep 2021	40	Disc.: Kitt Peak	MPC · JPL
2	2000 CD153	MBA-M	18.9	490 m	multiple	2000–2020	15 Feb 2020	45	Disc.: Spacewatch	MPC · JPL
1	2000 CR153	MBA-M	18.71	1.0 km	multiple	2000–2023	23 Aug 2023	75	Disc.: Kitt Peak	MPC · JPL
0	2000 CV153	MBA-O	17.3	1.9 km	multiple	2000–2019	25 Oct 2019	60	Disc.: Kitt Peak	MPC · JPL
0	2000 CD154	MBA-I	19.4	390 m	multiple	1995–2019	28 Oct 2019	62	Disc.: Spacewatch; Alt.: 1995 UJ15	MPC · JPL
1	2000 CK154	MBA-O	17.2	2.0 km	multiple	2000–2019	15 Nov 2019	42	Disc.: Spacewatch	MPC · JPL
0	2000 CS154	MBA-M	17.7	1.2 km	multiple	2000–2019	03 Oct 2019	38	Disc.: Kitt Peak	MPC · JPL
1	2000 CX154	MBA-M	18.0	1.1 km	multiple	2000–2017	05 Feb 2017	35	Disc.: Kitt Peak	MPC · JPL
0	2000 CZ154	MBA-O	17.3	1.9 km	multiple	2000–2019	02 Dec 2019	31	Disc.: Kitt Peak	MPC · JPL
0	2000 CB155	MBA-I	18.6	570 m	multiple	2000–2020	17 Sep 2020	34	Disc.: SDSS	MPC · JPL
0	2000 CC155	MBA-I	19.28	410 m	multiple	2000–2021	02 Oct 2021	75	Disc.: Spacewatch	MPC · JPL
0	2000 CE155	MBA-I	18.6	570 m	multiple	2000–2019	02 Jun 2019	29	Disc.: Kitt Peak	MPC · JPL
0	2000 CS155	MBA-M	17.8	1.2 km	multiple	2000–2019	29 Jul 2019	39	Disc.: Kitt Peak	MPC · JPL
0	2000 CW155	MBA-O	17.2	2.0 km	multiple	2000–2019	23 Sep 2019	44	Disc.: Kitt Peak	MPC · JPL
0	2000 CA156	MBA-I	18.2	680 m	multiple	2000–2020	17 Nov 2020	56	Disc.: Kitt Peak	MPC · JPL
0	2000 CD156	MBA-O	17.3	1.9 km	multiple	2000–2019	25 Sep 2019	29	Disc.: Kitt Peak	MPC · JPL
0	2000 CE156	MBA-O	17.61	1.9 km	multiple	2000–2024	26 Jun 2024	30	Disc.: Kitt Peak	MPC · JPL
0	2000 CG156	MBA-M	18.1	1.3 km	multiple	2000–2020	15 Sep 2020	46	Disc.: Kitt Peak	MPC · JPL
0	2000 CR156	MBA-I	18.9	490 m	multiple	2000–2020	23 Oct 2020	36	Disc.: Kitt Peak	MPC · JPL
0	2000 CB157	MBA-O	17.1	2.1 km	multiple	2000–2019	25 Jul 2019	27	Disc.: Spacewatch	MPC · JPL
1	2000 CC157	MBA-M	18.30	650 m	multiple	2000–2021	16 Apr 2021	25	Disc.: Kitt Peak	MPC · JPL
0	2000 CD157	MBA-M	18.02	1.4 km	multiple	2000–2021	08 Sep 2021	43	Disc.: Kitt Peak	MPC · JPL

back to top

== D ==
U	Designation	Class	Physical		Observations				Description and notes	Ref
U	Designation	Class	H	D	Opp.	Arc	Last	Used	Description and notes	Ref
1	2000 DN1	APO	19.9	370 m	multiple	2000–2018	12 Nov 2018	77	Disc.: LINEAR; Potentially hazardous object	MPC · JPL
0	2000 DF8	MCA	18.18	690 m	multiple	2000–2021	13 May 2021	146	Disc.: CSS	MPC · JPL
2	2000 DG8	CEN	13.1	16 km	multiple	2000–2001	01 Feb 2001	124	Disc.: LINEAR, albedo: 0.053	MPC · JPL
6	2000 DO8	APO	24.8	39 m	single	5 days	04 Mar 2000	55	Disc.: LINEAR	MPC · JPL
1	2000 DW91	MBA-I	18.8	520 m	multiple	2000–2020	20 Oct 2020	32	Disc.: Spacewatch; Added on 19 October 2020	MPC · JPL
1	2000 DH113	MBA-I	18.8	520 m	multiple	2000–2018	18 Mar 2018	31	Disc.: Spacewatch; Added on 22 July 2020; Alt.: 2000 ES201	MPC · JPL
1	2000 DN118	MBA-I	18.8	520 m	multiple	2000–2019	21 May 2019	50	Disc.: Spacewatch	MPC · JPL

back to top

== E ==
U	Designation	Class	Physical		Observations				Description and notes	Ref
U	Designation	Class	H	D	Opp.	Arc	Last	Used	Description and notes	Ref
–	2000 EY13	MCA	19.9	440 m	single	4 days	07 Mar 2000	20	Disc.: LINEAR	MPC · JPL
5	2000 EB14	ATE	23.1	85 m	multiple	2000–2011	03 Mar 2011	59	Disc.: LINEAR	MPC · JPL
E	2000 EQ23	MBA-I	20.0	300 m	single	4 days	12 Mar 2000	9	Disc.: Spacewatch	MPC · JPL
3	2000 EM26	ATE	22.5	110 m	multiple	2000–2020	27 Apr 2020	97	Disc.: LINEAR	MPC · JPL
1	2000 EU70	APO	18.9	590 m	multiple	2000–2019	18 Aug 2019	94	Disc.: LINEAR; Potentially hazardous object	MPC · JPL
2	2000 EO99	MBA-M	18.4	620 m	multiple	2000–2019	02 Dec 2019	45	Disc.: Spacewatch; Alt.: 2004 DX63	MPC · JPL
5	2000 EC104	AMO	21.3	200 m	single	19 days	29 Mar 2000	38	Disc.: LINEAR	MPC · JPL
0	2000 ES106	MCA	20.43	230 m	multiple	2000-2025	21 Apr 2025	77	Disc.: JPL	MPC · JPL
0	2000 EZ106	ATE	20.66	280 m	multiple	2000-2026	19 Mar 2026	94	Disc.: LONEOS	MPC · JPL8
1	2000 EJ178	MBA-I	19.0	470 m	multiple	2000–2020	10 Dec 2020	24	Disc.: Spacewatch; Added on 22 July 2020	MPC · JPL
1	2000 ET203	MBA-O	17.89	1.5 km	multiple	2000–2021	28 Sep 2021	31	Disc.: Cerro Tololo; Added on 11 May 2021; Alt.: 2016 PY189	MPC · JPL
0	2000 EW209	MBA-O	17.44	1.8 km	multiple	2000–2022	27 Jan 2022	44	Disc.: Spacewatch	MPC · JPL
0	2000 EZ209	MBA-I	19.23	420 m	multiple	2000–2021	08 Sep 2021	65	Disc.: SDSS	MPC · JPL
0	2000 EP211	MBA-O	16.9	2.3 km	multiple	2000–2018	13 Sep 2018	35	Disc.: SDSS	MPC · JPL
0	2000 EW211	MBA-I	18.5	590 m	multiple	2000–2019	27 May 2019	39	Disc.: SDSS	MPC · JPL
0	2000 EX211	MBA-I	18.1	710 m	multiple	2000–2020	11 Dec 2020	45	Disc.: SDSS	MPC · JPL
0	2000 EJ212	MBA-M	17.93	1.4 km	multiple	2000–2021	03 Oct 2021	31	Disc.: SDSS	MPC · JPL
0	2000 EK212	MBA-M	17.88	1.1 km	multiple	2000–2022	27 Jan 2022	35	Disc.: SDSS	MPC · JPL
0	2000 EL212	MBA-O	16.9	2.3 km	multiple	2000–2020	06 Dec 2020	27	Disc.: Spacewatch	MPC · JPL

back to top
