= List of unnumbered minor planets: 2001 A–E =

This is a partial list of unnumbered minor planets for principal provisional designations assigned between 1 January and 15 March 2001. As of May 2026, a total of 74 bodies remain unnumbered for this period. Objects for this year are listed on the following pages: A–E · F_{i} · F_{ii} · G–O · P–R · S · T · U · V–W and X–Y. Also see previous and next year.

Near-Earth obj.	MBA (inner)	MBA (outer)	Centaur
Mars-crosser	MBA (middle)	Jupiter trojan	Trans-Neptunian obj.
Unclassified

== A ==
U	Designation	Class	Physical		Observations				Description and notes	Ref
U	Designation	Class	H	D	Opp.	Arc	Last	Used	Description and notes	Ref
0	2001 AQ1	MCA	17.97	1.1 km	multiple	2001-2026 day	20 Jan 2026	65	Disc.: LINEAR; Added on 21 August 2021	MPC · JPL
1	2001 AT1	MCA	19.14	440 m	multiple	2000–2021	26 Nov 2021	68	Disc.: LINEAR	MPC · JPL
1	2001 AV43	APO	24.6	43 m	multiple	2000–2013	28 Oct 2013	101	Disc.: LINEAR	MPC · JPL

back to top

== B ==
U	Designation	Class	Physical		Observations				Description and notes	Ref
U	Designation	Class	H	D	Opp.	Arc	Last	Used	Description and notes	Ref
1	2001 BF10	APO	22.6	110 m	multiple	2001–2002	31 Dec 2002	35	Disc.: LINEAR	MPC · JPL
2	2001 BX15	APO	21.6	170 m	multiple	2001–2017	28 Jan 2017	103	Disc.: LINEAR	MPC · JPL
0	2001 BY15	AMO	19.1	540 m	multiple	2000–2014	19 Mar 2014	150	Disc.: LONEOS	MPC · JPL
6	2001 BA16	ATE	26.0	22 m	single	40 days	28 Feb 2001	20	Disc.: LINEAR	MPC · JPL
1	2001 BB16	ATE	23.2	81 m	multiple	2001–2020	17 Feb 2020	56	Disc.: LINEAR	MPC · JPL
5	2001 BC16	APO	23.9	59 m	single	62 days	23 Mar 2001	34	Disc.: LINEAR	MPC · JPL
1	2001 BD16	APO	19.97	360 m	multiple	1999–2021	24 Apr 2021	26	Disc.: LINEAR	MPC · JPL
1	2001 BE16	APO	19.89	370 m	multiple	2001–2022	13 Jan 2022	56	Disc.: LINEAR	MPC · JPL
8	2001 BB40	APO	24.6	43 m	single	2 days	26 Jan 2001	11	Disc.: Spacewatch; AMO at MPC	MPC · JPL
1	2001 BO60	AMO	18.923	490 m	multiple	2001–2024	02 Jul 2024	43	Disc.: LINEAR	MPC · JPL
–	2001 BM61	AMO	21.0	220 m	single	1 day	20 Jan 2001	9	Disc.: LINEAR	MPC · JPL
7	2001 BN61	APO	25.0	36 m	single	2 days	21 Jan 2001	8	Disc.: LINEAR	MPC · JPL
–	2001 BV70	MBA-O	14.7	6.4 km	single	50 days	20 Mar 2001	32	Disc.: LINEAR	MPC · JPL
E	2001 BQ82	MBA-O	16.3	3.1 km	single	2 days	27 Jan 2001	9	Disc.: Mauna Kea Obs.	MPC · JPL
0	2001 BK84	MBA-I	18.66	550 m	multiple	2001–2021	13 Sep 2021	45	Disc.: Spacewatch	MPC · JPL
0	2001 BB85	MBA-M	17.59	1.3 km	multiple	2001–2022	23 Jan 2022	41	Disc.: SDSS	MPC · JPL
0	2001 BE85	MBA-M	18.68	770 m	multiple	2001–2021	08 Nov 2021	36	Disc.: Spacewatch; Added on 24 December 2021	MPC · JPL

back to top

== C ==
U	Designation	Class	Physical		Observations				Description and notes	Ref
U	Designation	Class	H	D	Opp.	Arc	Last	Used	Description and notes	Ref
2	2001 CM	MCA	19.56	470 m	multiple	2001-2022	26 Dec 2022	51	Disc.: LONEOS	MPC · JPL
–	2001 CA21	APO	18.6	680 m	single	2 days	04 Feb 2001	13	Disc.: LINEAR	MPC · JPL
2	2001 CP36	ATE	23.7	65 m	multiple	2001–2007	09 Mar 2007	137	Disc.: LINEAR	MPC · JPL
0	2001 CQ36	ATE	22.74	100 m	multiple	2001–2022	05 May 2022	149	Disc.: LINEAR	MPC · JPL
0	2001 CV50	MBA-I	18.5	590 m	multiple	2001–2019	03 Apr 2019	81	Disc.: Spacewatch	MPC · JPL
1	2001 CZ50	MBA-I	18.7	540 m	multiple	2001–2019	08 Feb 2019	35	Disc.: Spacewatch	MPC · JPL

back to top

== D ==
U	Designation	Class	Physical		Observations				Description and notes	Ref
U	Designation	Class	H	D	Opp.	Arc	Last	Used	Description and notes	Ref
1	2001 DS8	AMO	22.6	110 m	single	60 days	18 Apr 2001	56	Disc.: AMOS	MPC · JPL
0	2001 DT8	AMO	19.31	500 m	multiple	2001-2024	13 Dec 2024	41	Disc.: LINEAR	MPC · JPL
5	2001 DG47	APO	23.0	89 m	single	58 days	18 Apr 2001	27	Disc.: LINEAR	MPC · JPL
1	2001 DB56	MBA-I	19.0	470 m	multiple	2001–2020	19 May 2020	40	Disc.: Spacewatch	MPC · JPL
6	2001 DZ76	APO	25.3	31 m	single	3 days	23 Feb 2001	34	Disc.: LINEAR	MPC · JPL
2	2001 DC77	AMO	19.5	450 m	multiple	2001–2005	09 Apr 2005	81	Disc.: LINEAR	MPC · JPL
E	2001 DC84	MBA-O	18.3	1.2 km	single	2 days	25 Feb 2001	13	Disc.: Cerro Tololo	MPC · JPL
2	2001 DO84	MBA-M	18.54	880 m	multiple	2001–2023	14 Oct 2023	72	Disc.: Cerro Tololo	MPC · JPL
2	2001 DR84	MBA-M	18.2	1.3 km	multiple	2001–2019	02 Jun 2019	30	Disc.: Cerro Tololo; Alt.: 2014 ES178	MPC · JPL
E	2001 DW84	MBA-I	19.9	310 m	single	2 days	25 Feb 2001	14	Disc.: Cerro Tololo	MPC · JPL
3	2001 DB85	MBA-M	19.26	780 m	multiple	2001–2019	07 May 2019	31	Disc.: Cerro Tololo	MPC · JPL
0	2001 DT85	MBA-I	19.17	440 m	multiple	2001–2020	16 Oct 2020	30	Disc.: Cerro Tololo	MPC · JPL
–	2001 DA86	MBA-O	19.2	800 m	single	23 days	20 Mar 2001	12	Disc.: Cerro Tololo	MPC · JPL
3	2001 DD86	MBA-O	17.9	1.5 km	multiple	2001–2020	10 Dec 2020	19	Disc.: Cerro Tololo; Added on 9 March 2021	MPC · JPL
2	2001 DP88	MBA-O	17.8	1.5 km	multiple	2001–2021	18 Jan 2021	71	Disc.: Spacewatch; Alt.: 2011 BO90, 2016 CB20	MPC · JPL
4	2001 DB106	TNO	6.6	167 km	multiple	2001–2019	03 Mar 2019	29	Disc.: La Silla Obs. LoUTNOs, cubewano (cold)	MPC · JPL
2	2001 DC106	TNO	6.4	174 km	multiple	2001–2020	31 Jan 2020	63	Disc.: La Silla Obs. LoUTNOs, cubewano (cold)	MPC · JPL
3	2001 DD106	TNO	7.3	115 km	multiple	2001–2020	28 Feb 2020	25	Disc.: La Silla Obs. LoUTNOs, cubewano (cold)	MPC · JPL
E	2001 DR106	TNO	8.3	75 km	single	3 days	25 Feb 2001	6	Disc.: Mauna Kea Obs. LoUTNOs, cubewano?	MPC · JPL
4	2001 DS106	TNO	8.36	75 km	multiple	2001-2013	08 Mar 2019	25	Disc.: Mauna Kea Obs. LoUTNOs, cubewano?	MPC · JPL
E	2001 DM108	TNO	7.3	119 km	single	3 days	25 Feb 2001	10	Disc.: Mauna Kea Obs. LoUTNOs, cubewano?	MPC · JPL
E	2001 DN108	TNO	7.8	95 km	single	3 days	25 Feb 2001	6	Disc.: Mauna Kea Obs. LoUTNOs, cubewano?	MPC · JPL
E	2001 DO108	TNO	8.4	72 km	single	3 days	25 Feb 2001	13	Disc.: Mauna Kea Obs. LoUTNOs, cubewano?	MPC · JPL
E	2001 DP108	TNO	10.0	47 km	single	3 days	25 Feb 2001	10	Disc.: Mauna Kea Obs. LoUTNOs, plutino?	MPC · JPL
E	2001 DQ108	TNO	8.6	65 km	single	3 days	25 Feb 2001	18	Disc.: Mauna Kea Obs. LoUTNOs, cubewano?	MPC · JPL
E	2001 DS108	TNO	8.0	86 km	single	3 days	25 Feb 2001	6	Disc.: Mauna Kea Obs. LoUTNOs, cubewano?	MPC · JPL
E	2001 DT108	TNO	9.5	60 km	single	3 days	25 Feb 2001	6	Disc.: Mauna Kea Obs. LoUTNOs, plutino?	MPC · JPL
E	2001 DU108	TNO	8.5	68 km	single	3 days	25 Feb 2001	4	Disc.: Mauna Kea Obs. LoUTNOs, cubewano?	MPC · JPL
6	2001 DV108	TNO	8.2	95 km	multiple	2001–2002	08 Apr 2002	15	Disc.: Mauna Kea Obs. LoUTNOs, other TNO	MPC · JPL
0	2001 DJ110	MBA-M	17.89	1.1 km	multiple	2001–2021	13 Nov 2021	38	Disc.: SDSS	MPC · JPL
0	2001 DD115	MBA-I	18.95	480 m	multiple	2001–2021	04 Aug 2021	48	Disc.: SDSS	MPC · JPL
0	2001 DX115	MBA-I	18.5	590 m	multiple	2001–2017	17 Sep 2017	35	Disc.: Spacewatch	MPC · JPL
1	2001 DC116	MBA-I	19.0	470 m	multiple	2001–2018	07 Mar 2018	33	Disc.: Spacewatch	MPC · JPL
0	2001 DF116	MBA-I	18.7	540 m	multiple	2001–2020	10 Aug 2020	34	Disc.: SDSS	MPC · JPL
1	2001 DP116	MBA-I	18.9	490 m	multiple	2001–2016	09 May 2016	28	Disc.: SDSS	MPC · JPL
1	2001 DR116	MBA-M	18.2	960 m	multiple	2001–2014	20 Mar 2014	16	Disc.: SDSS	MPC · JPL
1	2001 DC118	MBA-M	17.7	1.6 km	multiple	2001–2019	11 Feb 2019	34	Disc.: SDSS	MPC · JPL
0	2001 DS118	MBA-I	18.76	530 m	multiple	2001–2021	07 Sep 2021	66	Disc.: SDSS	MPC · JPL
0	2001 DV118	MBA-I	19.0	470 m	multiple	2001–2019	24 Aug 2019	39	Disc.: SDSS	MPC · JPL
0	2001 DW118	MBA-M	17.9	1.1 km	multiple	2001–2019	23 Aug 2019	34	Disc.: SDSS	MPC · JPL
0	2001 DY118	MBA-O	17.0	2.2 km	multiple	2001–2019	24 Aug 2019	30	Disc.: SDSS	MPC · JPL
0	2001 DC119	MBA-I	18.5	590 m	multiple	2001–2019	08 Feb 2019	30	Disc.: SDSS	MPC · JPL
1	2001 DK120	MBA-O	17.07	2.2 km	multiple	2001–2023	13 Mar 2023	36	Disc.: SDSS; Added on 17 January 2021	MPC · JPL

back to top

== E ==
U	Designation	Class	Physical		Observations				Description and notes	Ref
U	Designation	Class	H	D	Opp.	Arc	Last	Used	Description and notes	Ref
0	2001 EC	APO	18.66	660 m	multiple	2001–2021	09 Sep 2021	533	Disc.: LINEAR; Potentially hazardous object	MPC · JPL
3	2001 EV7	MBA-O	17.6	1.7 km	multiple	2001–2017	20 Mar 2017	23	Disc.: LONEOS; Added on 24 December 2021	MPC · JPL
0	2001 EC16	APO	22.3	120 m	multiple	2001–2015	18 Sep 2015	188	Disc.: AMOS	MPC · JPL
5	2001 ED18	ATE	24.5	45 m	single	5 days	20 Mar 2001	94	Disc.: LINEAR	MPC · JPL
3	2001 ES24	TNO	7.4	110 km	multiple	2001–2020	18 Feb 2020	22	Disc.: La Silla Obs. LoUTNOs, cubewano (cold)	MPC · JPL
1	2001 EC28	HUN	19.1	450 m	multiple	2001–2020	28 Apr 2020	37	Disc.: Spacewatch; Added on 22 July 2020	MPC · JPL

back to top
