= List of unnumbered trans-Neptunian objects: 2000 =

The following is a partial list of unnumbered trans-Neptunian objects for principal designations assigned within 2000. As of October 2026, it contains a total of 115 bodies. For more information see the description on the main page. Also see list for the previous and next year.

== 2000 ==
Designation	First Observed (discovered)		D (km)	Orbital description						Remarks	Refs
Designation	Date	Observer (Site)	D (km)	Class	a (AU)	e	i (°)	q (AU)	Q (AU)	Remarks	Refs
2000 AB_{229}	5 January 2000	LINEAR (704)	10	damocloid	52.1	0.96	69	2.3	102.0	albedo: 0.048	MPC · JPL
2000 AB_{255}	1 January 2000	Maunakea (568)	78	cubewano (hot)?	43.1	0.10	20	38.8	47.4	albedo: 0.079	MPC · JPL
2000 AC_{255}	1 January 2000	Maunakea (568)	78	cubewano (hot)?	46.8	0.16	35	39.3	54.3	albedo: 0.079	MPC · JPL
2000 AD_{255}	1 January 2000	Maunakea (568)	78	cubewano (hot)?	42.2	0.04	33	40.4	44.0	albedo: 0.079	MPC · JPL
2000 AE_{255}	6 January 2000	Maunakea (568)	103	cubewano (hot)?	44.1	0.06	36	41.3	46.8	albedo: 0.079	MPC · JPL
2000 AF_{255}	6 January 2000	J. J. Kavelaars, A. Morbidelli (568)	244	other TNO	48.9	0.25	31	36.8	61.1	albedo: 0.13; BRmag: 1.78	MPC · JPL
2000 CK_{105}	6 February 2000	M. W. Buie (695)	260	plutino	39.5	0.23	8	30.5	48.6	albedo: 0.074	MPC · JPL
2000 CL_{104}	5 February 2000	M. W. Buie (695)	171	cubewano (cold)	44.5	0.08	1	41.0	48.0	albedo: 0.152; BRmag: 1.85; taxonomy: RR	MPC · JPL
2000 CL_{105}	6 February 2000	M. W. Buie (695)	162	cubewano (cold)	43.2	0.04	4	41.3	45.0	albedo: 0.152; BRmag: 1.52	MPC · JPL
2000 CM_{104}	5 February 2000	M. W. Buie (695)	94	cubewano (cold)	44.5	0.09	1	40.6	48.3	albedo: 0.152	MPC · JPL
2000 CN_{104}	5 February 2000	Kitt Peak (695)	197	cubewano (hot)?	42.9	0.00	32	42.9	42.9	albedo: 0.079	MPC · JPL
2000 CN_{114}	5 February 2000	M. W. Buie (695)	123	cubewano (cold)	44.1	0.04	2	42.2	45.9	albedo: 0.152	MPC · JPL
2000 CO_{114}	5 February 2000	Kitt Peak (695)	197	cubewano (hot)?	46.1	0.06	33	43.3	49.0	albedo: 0.079	MPC · JPL
2000 CP_{105}	5 February 2000	Kitt Peak (695)	109	SDO	83.2	0.59	19	34.5	131.9	albedo: 0.124	MPC · JPL
2000 CP_{114}	6 February 2000	Kitt Peak (695)	123	plutino?	39.5	0.17	31	32.9	46.0	albedo: 0.074	MPC · JPL
2000 CS_{105}	6 February 2000	M. W. Buie (695)	101	other TNO	39.2	0.02	5	38.5	39.8	albedo: 0.13	MPC · JPL
2000 CY_{105}	5 February 2000	Kitt Peak (695)	226	cubewano (hot)?	45.5	0.09	10	41.4	49.7	albedo: 0.079	MPC · JPL
2000 FB_{8}	27 March 2000	J. J. Kavelaars, B. Gladman, J.-M. Petit, M. J. Holman (568)	112	plutino	39.3	0.30	5	27.6	51.0	albedo: 0.074	MPC · JPL
2000 FC_{8}	27 March 2000	J. J. Kavelaars, B. Gladman, J.-M. Petit, M. J. Holman (568)	86	cubewano (cold)	43.9	0.06	1	41.1	46.7	albedo: 0.152	MPC · JPL
2000 FH_{8}	29 March 2000	J. J. Kavelaars, B. Gladman, J.-M. Petit, M. J. Holman (568)	124	cubewano (cold)	43.5	0.03	2	42.0	44.9	albedo: 0.152	MPC · JPL
2000 FR_{53}	31 March 2000	S. S. Sheppard, D. C. Jewitt, C. A. Trujillo (568)	113	res · 5:9	44.4	0.09	3	40.5	48.3	albedo: 0.126	MPC · JPL
2000 FS_{53}	31 March 2000	S. S. Sheppard, D. C. Jewitt, C. A. Trujillo (568)	94	cubewano (cold)	42.9	0.04	2	41.3	44.5	albedo: 0.152; BRmag: 1.77	MPC · JPL
2000 FT_{53}	31 March 2000	D. C. Jewitt, C. A. Trujillo, S. S. Sheppard (568)	103	cubewano (hot)	44.9	0.15	12	38.2	51.7	albedo: 0.079	MPC · JPL
2000 FU_{53}	31 March 2000	S. S. Sheppard, D. C. Jewitt, C. A. Trujillo (568)	93	cubewano (hot)?	41.2	0.05	6	39.4	43.1	albedo: 0.079	MPC · JPL
2000 FW_{53}	31 March 2000	Maunakea (568)	172	cubewano (hot)?	47.2	0.15	7	40.3	54.1	albedo: 0.079	MPC · JPL
2000 FY_{53}	31 March 2000	C. A. Trujillo, S. S. Sheppard, D. C. Jewitt (568)	96	centaur	66.5	0.74	22	17.5	115.6	albedo: 0.058	MPC · JPL
2000 GF_{147}	5 April 2000	C. A. Trujillo, S. S. Sheppard, D. C. Jewitt (568)	77	SDO	102.3	0.63	4	38.1	166.4	albedo: 0.124	MPC · JPL
2000 GK_{147}	2 April 2000	Maunakea (568)	55	SDO	57.3	0.46	6	31.0	83.7	albedo: 0.124	MPC · JPL
2000 GL_{147}	2 April 2000	D. C. Jewitt, C. A. Trujillo, S. S. Sheppard (568)	101	other TNO	35.7	0.10	14	32.2	39.1	albedo: 0.13	MPC · JPL
2000 GM_{147}	3 April 2000	Maunakea (568)	129	plutino?	39.6	0.19	18	32.0	47.2	albedo: 0.074	MPC · JPL
2000 GV_{146}	2 April 2000	D. C. Jewitt, C. A. Trujillo, S. S. Sheppard (568)	106	cubewano (cold)	43.9	0.07	4	40.9	47.0	albedo: 0.152	MPC · JPL
2000 GW_{146}	3 April 2000	Maunakea (568)	113	cubewano (hot)?	41.2	0.00	29	41.2	41.2	albedo: 0.079	MPC · JPL
2000 GX_{146}	3 April 2000	C. A. Trujillo, S. S. Sheppard, D. C. Jewitt (568)	94	cubewano (cold)	44.0	0.01	1	43.4	44.7	albedo: 0.152	MPC · JPL
2000 GY_{146}	3 April 2000	C. A. Trujillo, S. S. Sheppard, D. C. Jewitt (568)	90	cubewano (cold)	43.9	0.02	3	43.0	44.9	albedo: 0.152	MPC · JPL
2000 GZ_{146}	3 April 2000	C. A. Trujillo, S. S. Sheppard, D. C. Jewitt (568)	97	SDO	92.5	0.56	2	40.4	144.6	albedo: 0.124	MPC · JPL
2000 JF_{81}	6 May 2000	O. R. Hainaut, C. E. Delahodde, M. Vair (809)	124	cubewano (cold)	45.9	0.10	2	41.4	50.5	albedo: 0.152	MPC · JPL
2000 JH_{81}	6 May 2000	O. R. Hainaut, C. E. Delahodde, M. Vair (809)	82	cubewano (hot)?	50.4	0.11	10	45.1	55.8	albedo: 0.079	MPC · JPL
2000 KL_{4}	28 May 2000	M. J. Holman, B. Gladman, J. J. Kavelaars (695)	111	other TNO	38.4	0.06	21	36.0	40.8	albedo: 0.13	MPC · JPL
2000 KP_{65}	27 May 2000	LONEOS (699)	48	damocloid	87.8	0.96	46	3.3	172.3	albedo: 0.048	MPC · JPL
2000 OB_{51}	25 July 2000	B. Gladman, J.-M. Petit (809)	91	other TNO	37.8	0.03	5	36.5	39.1	albedo: 0.13	MPC · JPL
2000 OH_{67}	29 July 2000	M. W. Buie, S. D. Kern (807)	225	cubewano (hot)	44.1	0.02	6	43.4	44.9	albedo: 0.079	MPC · JPL
2000 OP_{67}	31 July 2000	M. W. Buie, S. D. Kern (807)	118	res · 4:7	43.6	0.19	1	35.5	51.8	albedo: 0.126	MPC · JPL
2000 PA_{30}	5 August 2000	M. J. Holman (568)	86	cubewano (cold)	47.0	0.13	0	40.6	53.3	albedo: 0.152	MPC · JPL
2000 PB_{30}	5 August 2000	Maunakea (568)	113	cubewano (hot)?	42.5	0.00	8	42.5	42.5	albedo: 0.079	MPC · JPL
2000 PC_{30}	5 August 2000	M. J. Holman (568)	103	cubewano (cold)	43.0	0.03	1	41.8	44.3	albedo: 0.152	MPC · JPL
2000 PD_{30}	5 August 2000	M. J. Holman (568)	138	cubewano (cold)	46.5	0.02	5	45.5	47.4	albedo: 0.152	MPC · JPL
2000 PF_{30}	5 August 2000	M. J. Holman (568)	99	SDO	76.1	0.50	6	37.9	114.2	albedo: 0.124	MPC · JPL
2000 PG_{30}	5 August 2000	M. J. Holman (568)	102	cubewano (cold)	45.0	0.11	5	40.3	49.8	albedo: 0.152	MPC · JPL
2000 PH_{30}	5 August 2000	M. J. Holman (568)	117	SDO	76.8	0.50	8	38.3	115.3	albedo: 0.124	MPC · JPL
2000 PL_{30}	5 August 2000	M. J. Holman (568)	129	res · 3:5	42.0	0.24	6	31.9	52.1	albedo: 0.126	MPC · JPL
2000 PM_{30}	5 August 2000	M. J. Holman (568)	90	cubewano (cold)	43.9	0.06	2	41.4	46.5	albedo: 0.152	MPC · JPL
2000 PN_{30}	5 August 2000	M. J. Holman (568)	93	cubewano (cold)	44.8	0.10	2	40.2	49.3	albedo: 0.152	MPC · JPL
2000 PQ_{30}	3 August 2000	J.-M. Petit (809)	65	cubewano (cold)	41.7	0.07	1	38.8	44.7	albedo: 0.152	MPC · JPL
2000 PR_{30}	7 August 2000	European Southern Observatory, La Silla (809)	82	cubewano (cold)?	42.3	0.08	1	39.2	45.5	albedo: 0.152	MPC · JPL
2000 PS_{30}	7 August 2000	B. Gladman, J.-M. Petit (809)	66	other TNO	40.1	0.10	3	36.2	44.0	albedo: 0.13	MPC · JPL
2000 PU_{29}	5 August 2000	M. J. Holman (568)	83	cubewano (cold)	42.4	0.02	1	41.5	43.3	albedo: 0.152	MPC · JPL
2000 PW_{29}	5 August 2000	M. J. Holman (568)	75	cubewano (cold)	44.1	0.06	2	41.5	46.7	albedo: 0.152	MPC · JPL
2000 PX_{29}	5 August 2000	M. J. Holman (568)	147	cubewano (hot)	42.5	0.06	6	40.1	45.0	albedo: 0.079	MPC · JPL
2000 PY_{29}	5 August 2000	M. J. Holman (568)	118	cubewano (cold)	44.2	0.06	1	41.6	46.8	albedo: 0.152	MPC · JPL
2000 PZ_{29}	5 August 2000	Maunakea (568)	150	cubewano (hot)?	44.9	0.00	14	44.9	44.9	albedo: 0.079	MPC · JPL
2000 QB_{226}	29 August 2000	O. R. Hainaut, C. E. Delahodde (809)	185	SDO	94.5	0.55	3	42.9	146.2	albedo: 0.124	MPC · JPL
2000 QD_{226}	29 August 2000	European Southern Observatory, La Silla (809)	118	cubewano (cold)?	41.2	0.00	2	41.2	41.2	albedo: 0.152	MPC · JPL
2000 QF_{226}	29 August 2000	European Southern Observatory, La Silla (809)	75	cubewano (cold)?	46.5	0.00	2	46.5	46.5	albedo: 0.152	MPC · JPL
2000 QG_{226}	29 August 2000	O. R. Hainaut, C. E. Delahodde (809)	107	SDO	64.6	0.41	2	38.0	91.2	albedo: 0.124	MPC · JPL
2000 QH_{226}	29 August 2000	O. R. Hainaut, C. E. Delahodde (809)	77	plutino	39.6	0.19	3	32.1	47.1	albedo: 0.074	MPC · JPL
2000 QJ_{226}	29 August 2000	European Southern Observatory, La Silla (809)	117	plutino?	39.4	0.11	10	34.9	43.9	albedo: 0.074	MPC · JPL
2000 QJ_{252}	25 August 2000	Cerro Tololo Observatory, La Serena (807)	143	cubewano (hot)?	43.2	0.12	12	37.9	48.6	albedo: 0.079	MPC · JPL
2000 QK_{226}	29 August 2000	O. R. Hainaut, C. E. Delahodde (809)	102	SDO	77.6	0.52	24	37.0	118.3	albedo: 0.124	MPC · JPL
2000 QK_{252}	27 August 2000	Cerro Tololo Observatory, La Serena (807)	260	cubewano (hot)?	45.1	0.20	8	36.3	54.0	albedo: 0.079	MPC · JPL
2000 QL_{226}	29 August 2000	O. R. Hainaut, C. E. Delahodde (809)	81	res · 4:7	43.8	0.19	3	35.6	52.0	albedo: 0.126	MPC · JPL
2000 QL_{252}	27 August 2000	M. W. Buie (807)	111	other TNO	45.9	0.26	24	34.2	57.6	albedo: 0.13	MPC · JPL
2000 QN_{251}	26 August 2000	M. W. Buie (807)	126	res · 3:5	42.3	0.13	0	37.0	47.6	albedo: 0.126; BRmag: 1.63; taxonomy: IR-RR	MPC · JPL
2000 QN_{252}	28 August 2000	Cerro Tololo Observatory, La Serena (807)	106	other TNO	36.5	0.00	2	36.5	36.5	albedo: 0.13	MPC · JPL
2000 QO_{252}	28 August 2000	Cerro Tololo Observatory, La Serena (807)	188	cubewano (hot)?	45.6	0.15	13	38.9	52.2	albedo: 0.079	MPC · JPL
2000 SB_{331}	23 September 2000	Maunakea (568)	136	cubewano (hot)?	46.4	0.00	6	46.4	46.4	albedo: 0.079	MPC · JPL
2000 SC_{331}	23 September 2000	Maunakea (568)	124	cubewano (hot)?	46.5	0.00	9	46.5	46.5	albedo: 0.079	MPC · JPL
2000 SD_{331}	23 September 2000	Maunakea (568)	108	cubewano (cold)?	43.7	0.00	3	43.7	43.7	albedo: 0.152	MPC · JPL
2000 SE_{331}	23 September 2000	Maunakea (568)	124	cubewano (hot)?	43.5	0.00	5	43.5	43.5	albedo: 0.079	MPC · JPL
2000 SF_{331}	23 September 2000	Maunakea (568)	113	cubewano (cold)?	44.0	0.00	4	44.0	44.0	albedo: 0.152	MPC · JPL
2000 SG_{331}	23 September 2000	B. Gladman (568)	93	cubewano (cold)?	44.1	0.10	2	39.8	48.4	albedo: 0.152	MPC · JPL
2000 SH_{331}	23 September 2000	B. Gladman (568)	149	cubewano (cold)?	41.7	0.10	3	37.4	46.0	albedo: 0.152	MPC · JPL
2000 SJ_{331}	23 September 2000	B. Gladman (568)	51	cubewano (cold)?	105.5	0.67	3	34.5	176.5	albedo: 0.152	MPC · JPL
2000 SK_{331}	23 September 2000	B. Gladman (568)	90	cubewano (cold)?	45.0	0.07	3	41.7	48.4	albedo: 0.152	MPC · JPL
2000 SL_{331}	23 September 2000	B. Gladman (568)	123	cubewano (cold)?	41.5	0.11	3	37.0	46.1	albedo: 0.152	MPC · JPL
2000 SM_{331}	23 September 2000	B. Gladman (568)	118	other TNO	36.8	0.11	16	32.8	40.8	albedo: 0.13	MPC · JPL
2000 SO_{331}	23 September 2000	B. Gladman (568)	122	cubewano (cold)?	43.5	0.10	2	39.4	47.7	albedo: 0.152	MPC · JPL
2000 SP_{331}	23 September 2000	B. Gladman (568)	84	cubewano (cold)?	41.4	0.10	3	37.1	45.6	albedo: 0.152	MPC · JPL
2000 SQ_{331}	23 September 2000	Maunakea (568)	40	centaur	69.8	0.71	5	20.5	119.1	albedo: 0.058	MPC · JPL
2000 SR_{331}	23 September 2000	B. Gladman (568)	67	res · 2:5	56.1	0.44	4	31.2	80.9	albedo: 0.126	MPC · JPL
2000 SS_{331}	23 September 2000	B. Gladman (568)	104	other TNO	35.1	0.11	4	31.4	38.9	albedo: 0.13	MPC · JPL
2000 ST_{331}	23 September 2000	B. Gladman (568)	62	cubewano (cold)?	42.8	0.14	3	36.7	48.9	albedo: 0.152	MPC · JPL
2000 SU_{331}	23 September 2000	B. Gladman (568)	57	other TNO	39.1	0.10	3	35.3	42.8	albedo: 0.13	MPC · JPL
2000 SW_{370}	23 September 2000	Maunakea (568)	94	cubewano (hot)?	43.8	0.09	6	40.1	47.5	albedo: 0.079	MPC · JPL
2000 SX_{370}	23 September 2000	B. Gladman, J. J. Kavelaars (568)	111	cubewano (hot)?	44.6	0.10	19	40.0	49.2	albedo: 0.079	MPC · JPL
2000 SY_{370}	23 September 2000	B. Gladman, J. J. Kavelaars (568)	86	cubewano (cold)	43.6	0.05	2	41.5	45.7	albedo: 0.152	MPC · JPL
2000 WL_{183}	26 November 2000	O. R. Hainaut, C. E. Delahodde, A. C. Delsanti (809)	103	cubewano (cold)	43.8	0.06	4	41.2	46.5	albedo: 0.152	MPC · JPL
2000 WM_{183}	26 November 2000	O. R. Hainaut, C. E. Delahodde, A. C. Delsanti (809)	172	cubewano (hot)	45.2	0.11	7	40.2	50.2	albedo: 0.079	MPC · JPL
2000 WN_{183}	26 November 2000	O. R. Hainaut, C. E. Delahodde, A. C. Delsanti (809)	136	cubewano (cold)	45.1	0.12	4	39.7	50.4	albedo: 0.152	MPC · JPL
2000 WO_{183}	26 November 2000	O. R. Hainaut, C. E. Delahodde, A. C. Delsanti (809)	110	cubewano (cold)	44.1	0.06	2	41.3	46.9	albedo: 0.152	MPC · JPL
2000 WV_{12}	24 November 2000	B. Gladman, J.-M. Petit (809)	143	cubewano (cold)	43.8	0.03	2	42.4	45.2	albedo: 0.152	MPC · JPL
2000 WW_{12}	24 November 2000	B. Gladman, J.-M. Petit (809)	114	SDO	53.1	0.41	3	31.1	75.1	albedo: 0.124	MPC · JPL
2000 WX_{12}	24 November 2000	European Southern Observatory, La Silla (809)	143	cubewano (hot)?	43.8	0.14	12	37.8	49.8	albedo: 0.079	MPC · JPL
2000 YA_{2}	17 December 2000	M. J. Holman, B. Gladman, T. Grav (695)	136	cubewano (cold)	44.3	0.06	2	41.8	46.8	albedo: 0.152	MPC · JPL
2000 YB_{29}	22 December 2000	Maunakea (568)	129	plutino?	39.4	0.31	8	27.2	51.6	albedo: 0.074; BRmag: 1.50	MPC · JPL
2000 YD_{2}	17 December 2000	Kitt Peak (695)	124	cubewano (hot)?	42.9	0.10	22	38.5	47.4	albedo: 0.079	MPC · JPL
2000 YE_{2}	17 December 2000	M. J. Holman, B. Gladman, T. Grav (695)	83	twotino	48.4	0.21	4	38.1	58.6	albedo: 0.126	MPC · JPL
2000 YF_{2}	17 December 2000	M. J. Holman, B. Gladman, T. Grav (695)	138	cubewano (cold)	45.9	0.08	2	42.4	49.4	albedo: 0.152	MPC · JPL
2000 YG_{2}	17 December 2000	Kitt Peak (695)	136	cubewano (hot)?	42.8	0.09	25	39.2	46.5	albedo: 0.079	MPC · JPL
2000 YQ_{142}	22 December 2000	Maunakea (568)	148	plutino?	39.5	0.28	24	28.3	50.7	albedo: 0.074	MPC · JPL
2000 YV_{1}	16 December 2000	M. J. Holman, B. Gladman, T. Grav (695)	122	cubewano (cold)	44.2	0.03	1	42.8	45.5	albedo: 0.152	MPC · JPL
2000 YW_{1}	16 December 2000	Kitt Peak (695)	136	cubewano (cold)?	42.9	0.00	1	42.9	42.9	albedo: 0.152	MPC · JPL
2000 YX_{1}	16 December 2000	M. J. Holman, B. Gladman, T. Grav (695)	132	cubewano (cold)	45.9	0.08	5	42.4	49.4	albedo: 0.152	MPC · JPL
2000 YY_{1}	17 December 2000	M. J. Holman, B. Gladman, T. Grav (695)	210	centaur	64.3	0.54	8	29.9	98.8	albedo: 0.058	MPC · JPL
2000 YY_{142}	23 December 2000	Maunakea (568)	118	cubewano (cold)?	44.9	0.10	2	40.5	49.3	albedo: 0.152	MPC · JPL
2000 YZ_{1}	17 December 2000	M. J. Holman, B. Gladman, T. Grav (695)	124	cubewano (hot)?	44.8	0.13	6	38.9	50.7	albedo: 0.079	MPC · JPL

back to top
