= List of unnumbered minor planets: 2001 X–Y =

This is a partial list of unnumbered minor planets for principal provisional designations assigned during 1–31 December 2001. As of March 2026, a total of 82 bodies remain unnumbered for this period. Objects for this year are listed on the following pages: A–E · F_{i} · F_{ii} · G–O · P–R · S · T · U · V–W and X–Y. Also see previous and next year.

Near-Earth obj.	MBA (inner)	MBA (outer)	Centaur
Mars-crosser	MBA (middle)	Jupiter trojan	Trans-Neptunian obj.
Unclassified

== X ==
U	Designation	Class	Physical		Observations				Description and notes	Ref
U	Designation	Class	H	D	Opp.	Arc	Last	Used	Description and notes	Ref
0	2001 XP	APO	21.41	250 m	multiple	2001-2024	21 Dec 2024	62	Disc.: LINEAR	MPC · JPL
0	2001 XQ	APO	19.2	510 m	multiple	2001–2015	22 Dec 2015	161	Disc.: LINEAR; Potentially hazardous object AMO at MPC; Alt.: 2008 VV4	MPC · JPL
0	2001 XG1	APO	23.2	81 m	multiple	2001–2018	09 Dec 2018	112	Disc.: LINEAR	MPC · JPL
–	2001 XM1	MCA	18.9	490 m	single	31 days	16 Dec 2001	51	Disc.: LINEAR	MPC · JPL
0	2001 XB3	MBA-I	18.37	630 m	multiple	2001-2023	29 Jan 2023	59	Disc.: LINEAR; Alt.: 2022 UF116	MPC · JPL
0	2001 XS4	MCA	18.7	530 m	multiple	2001–2024	13 Nov 2024	59	Disc.: LINEAR	MPC · JPL
9	2001 XU4	APO	23.8	62 m	single	5 days	14 Dec 2001	30	Disc.: LINEAR	MPC · JPL
4	2001 XX4	APO	22.1	140 m	multiple	2001–2003	03 Jan 2003	102	Disc.: LINEAR	MPC · JPL
1	2001 XW10	APO	19.4	470 m	multiple	2001–2004	31 Dec 2004	39	Disc.: LINEAR	MPC · JPL
8	2001 XH16	APO	24.8	39 m	single	11 days	20 Dec 2001	12	Disc.: Mauna Kea Obs.	MPC · JPL
1	2001 XL16	Asteroid	20.2	420 m	multiple	2001-2025	20 Feb 2025	44	Disc.: Spacewatch; MCA at MPC	MPC · JPL
1	2001 XP31	APO	22.2	130 m	multiple	2001–2018	04 Feb 2018	38	Disc.: LINEAR; Alt.: 2017 WB15	MPC · JPL
1	2001 XQ31	AMO	19.74	510 m	multiple	2001-2025	11 Dec 2025	97	Disc.: LINEAR	MPC · JPL
0	2001 XR69	MCA	17.5	940 m	multiple	2001–2017	24 Jun 2017	45	Disc.: LINEAR; Alt.: 2005 SZ133	MPC · JPL
–	2001 XN88	MCA	18.6	570 m	single	30 days	12 Jan 2002	29	Disc.: LINEAR	MPC · JPL
7	2001 XO88	APO	22.0	140 m	single	26 days	09 Jan 2002	28	Disc.: LINEAR	MPC · JPL
7	2001 XX103	APO	23.6	68 m	single	5 days	20 Dec 2001	30	Disc.: LINEAR	MPC · JPL
1	2001 XY103	MBA-M	17.38	1.4 km	multiple	2001-2022	20 Dec 2022	33	Disc.: LINEAR	MPC · JPL
0	2001 XG105	APO	21.95	190 m	multiple	2001-2025	15 Dec 2025	67	Disc.: LINEAR; AMO at MPC	MPC · JPL
3	2001 XK105	AMO	23.8	62 m	single	73 days	16 Feb 2002	27	Disc.: LINEAR	MPC · JPL
1	2001 XB114	MBA-O	17.33	1.9 km	multiple	2001–2021	05 Jul 2021	42	Disc.: LINEAR	MPC · JPL
1	2001 XB124	MCA	18.5	590 m	multiple	1986–2016	18 Dec 2016	54	Disc.: Palomar Obs. Alt.: 1986 VE8	MPC · JPL
1	2001 XM136	MBA-M	18.71	540 m	multiple	2001–2021	31 Jul 2021	48	Disc.: LINEAR; Alt.: 2005 VC52	MPC · JPL
–	2001 XO138	MBA-M	18.2	680 m	single	5 days	17 Dec 2001	11	Disc.: LINEAR	MPC · JPL
0	2001 XF144	MBA-M	17.85	1.5 km	multiple	2001-2023	18 Mar 2023	56	Disc.: LINEAR	MPC · JPL
0	2001 XO144	MBA-O	16.7	2.5 km	multiple	2001–2019	04 Jan 2019	68	Disc.: LINEAR	MPC · JPL
–	2001 XW150	Asteroid	17.4	1.8 km	single	8 days	22 Dec 2001	12	Disc.: LINEAR; MBA-O at MPC	MPC · JPL
0	2001 XK160	MBA-I	18.6	570 m	multiple	2001–2020	24 Mar 2020	47	Disc.: LINEAR; Added on 22 July 2020	MPC · JPL
0	2001 XS201	MBA-M	17.8	1.2 km	multiple	2001–2020	04 Jan 2020	27	Disc.: LPL/Spacewatch II	MPC · JPL
0	2001 XW219	MCA	18.65	550 m	multiple	2001–2022	07 Jan 2022	196	Disc.: LINEAR; Alt.: 2011 UQ254	MPC · JPL
–	2001 XF221	MBA-M	19.1	640 m	single	4 days	19 Dec 2001	12	Disc.: LINEAR	MPC · JPL
0	2001 XZ245	MBA-I	17.7	860 m	multiple	2001–2016	06 Dec 2016	41	Disc.: LINEAR	MPC · JPL
1	2001 XG253	MBA-I	17.5	940 m	multiple	2001–2021	13 Jun 2021	37	Disc.: LINEAR; Added on 9 March 2021; Alt.: 2018 WE6	MPC · JPL
4	2001 XU254	TNO	6.68	237 km	multiple	2001–2020	09 Dec 2020	30	Disc.: Mauna Kea Obs. LoUTNOs, cubewano (hot)	MPC · JPL
E	2001 XV254	TNO	7.0	137 km	single	59 days	06 Feb 2002	7	Disc.: Mauna Kea Obs. LoUTNOs, cubewano?	MPC · JPL
E	2001 XW254	TNO	7.7	99 km	single	29 days	08 Jan 2002	4	Disc.: Mauna Kea Obs. LoUTNOs, cubewano?	MPC · JPL
5	2001 XX254	TNO	7.32	114 km	multiple	2001–2021	11 Jan 2021	20	Disc.: Mauna Kea Obs. LoUTNOs, cubewano (cold)	MPC · JPL
E	2001 XB255	TNO	6.8	150 km	single	36 days	14 Jan 2002	5	Disc.: Mauna Kea Obs. LoUTNOs, cubewano?	MPC · JPL
E	2001 XC255	TNO	7.4	114 km	single	56 days	03 Feb 2002	6	Disc.: Mauna Kea Obs. LoUTNOs, cubewano?	MPC · JPL
E	2001 XE255	TNO	7.9	90 km	single	36 days	14 Jan 2002	4	Disc.: Mauna Kea Obs. LoUTNOs, cubewano?	MPC · JPL
E	2001 XF255	TNO	7.7	99 km	single	36 days	14 Jan 2002	4	Disc.: Mauna Kea Obs. LoUTNOs, cubewano?	MPC · JPL
E	2001 XG255	TNO	8.3	75 km	single	36 days	14 Jan 2002	5	Disc.: Mauna Kea Obs. LoUTNOs, cubewano?	MPC · JPL
E	2001 XJ255	TNO	8.3	75 km	single	34 days	14 Jan 2002	5	Disc.: Mauna Kea Obs. LoUTNOs, cubewano?	MPC · JPL
0	2001 XQ255	MBA-I	18.7	540 m	multiple	2001–2020	16 Mar 2020	53	Disc.: Spacewatch; Alt.: 2016 AX89	MPC · JPL
3	2001 XZ255	CEN	11.1	34 km	multiple	2001–2003	03 Mar 2003	13	Disc.: Mauna Kea Obs., BR-mag: 2.04	MPC · JPL
0	2001 XG258	MCA	19.14	620 m	multiple	2001–2019	30 Jan 2019	70	Disc.: LONEOS	MPC · JPL
0	2001 XS263	MBA-O	17.9	1.5 km	multiple	2001–2019	02 Mar 2019	55	Disc.: NEAT	MPC · JPL
0	2001 XQ268	MBA-O	16.31	3.0 km	multiple	2001–2021	19 May 2021	200	Disc.: SDSS	MPC · JPL
1	2001 XM269	MBA-O	17.1	2.1 km	multiple	2001–2019	08 Jan 2019	20	Disc.: LPL/Spacewatch II	MPC · JPL

back to top

== Y ==
U	Designation	Class	Physical		Observations				Description and notes	Ref
U	Designation	Class	H	D	Opp.	Arc	Last	Used	Description and notes	Ref
0	2001 YL	MCA	19.64	410 m	multiple	2001–2025	01 Jan 2025	111	Disc.: LINEAR; Alt.: 2019 WF5	MPC · JPL
–	2001 YM	MCA	19.1	640 m	single	5 days	19 Dec 2001	14	Disc.: LINEAR	MPC · JPL
0	2001 YQ	MBA-M	17.3	1.5 km	multiple	2001–2018	14 Dec 2018	42	Disc.: LINEAR; Alt.: 2014 WC6	MPC · JPL
1	2001 YW	HUN	18.1	710 m	multiple	2001–2019	24 Jun 2019	112	Disc.: LINEAR	MPC · JPL
0	2001 YZ	MCA	18.74	530 m	multiple	2001–2020	18 Jul 2020	95	Disc.: LINEAR	MPC · JPL
5	2001 YA1	AMO	20.8	250 m	single	62 days	17 Feb 2002	22	Disc.: LINEAR	MPC · JPL
2	2001 YB1	AMO	21.7	160 m	multiple	2001–2016	21 Dec 2016	36	Disc.: LINEAR	MPC · JPL
–	2001 YC1	APO	24.1	54 m	single	2 days	19 Dec 2001	13	Disc.: LINEAR	MPC · JPL
8	2001 YD1	APO	24.4	47 m	single	7 days	24 Dec 2001	32	Disc.: LINEAR	MPC · JPL
5	2001 YE1	APO	20.8	250 m	single	58 days	13 Feb 2002	120	Disc.: LINEAR	MPC · JPL
0	2001 YM2	AMO	19.68	420 m	multiple	2001–2023	05 Aug 2023	221	Disc.: LINEAR	MPC · JPL
7	2001 YN2	APO	25.4	30 m	single	21 days	08 Jan 2002	35	Disc.: LINEAR	MPC · JPL
7	2001 YO2	APO	21.0	220 m	single	24 days	11 Jan 2002	25	Disc.: LINEAR	MPC · JPL
0	2001 YP3	APO	22.0	140 m	multiple	2001–2005	10 Dec 2005	127	Disc.: LINEAR; Potentially hazardous object	MPC · JPL
0	2001 YQ3	MCA	17.7	1.6 km	multiple	2001–2017	24 May 2017	88	Disc.: LONEOS; Alt.: 2017 HH3	MPC · JPL
–	2001 YR3	AMO	23.3	78 m	single	4 days	23 Dec 2001	19	Disc.: LINEAR	MPC · JPL
0	2001 YT3	AMO	21.14	220 m	multiple	1991–2013	05 Apr 2013	121	Disc.: Spacewatch	MPC · JPL
0	2001 YU3	AMO	19.90	370 m	multiple	2001–2021	09 Jun 2021	466	Disc.: LINEAR	MPC · JPL
0	2001 YV3	APO	20.59	270 m	multiple	2001–2021	18 Jan 2021	163	Disc.: AMOS; Potentially hazardous object	MPC · JPL
1	2001 YM4	AMO	19.9	370 m	multiple	2001–2020	23 Jan 2020	123	Disc.: LINEAR	MPC · JPL
5	2001 YB5	APO	20.9	230 m	single	11 days	06 Jan 2002	396	Disc.: NEAT; Potentially hazardous object	MPC · JPL
0	2001 YX11	AMO	20.0	360 m	multiple	2001–2008	05 Dec 2008	98	Disc.: LONEOS	MPC · JPL
1	2001 YH31	HIL	15.54	6.6 km	multiple	2001-2010	28 Feb 2010	35	Disc.: LINEAR Alt.: 2010 DK68	MPC · JPL
3	2001 YK61	CEN	13.7	11 km	single	61 days	21 Jan 2002	31	Disc.: LINEAR	MPC · JPL
0	2001 YV71	MBA-M	17.8	1.2 km	multiple	2001–2018	31 Dec 2018	38	Disc.: LINEAR	MPC · JPL
0	2001 YL92	MBA-O	16.8	2.4 km	multiple	2001–2018	13 Jan 2018	46	Disc.: LPL/Spacewatch II	MPC · JPL
3	2001 YC93	MBA-O	17.5	1.8 km	multiple	2001–2019	08 Feb 2019	17	Disc.: Kitt Peak Obs.	MPC · JPL
3	2001 YF93	MBA-M	19.1	450 m	multiple	2001–2021	26 Nov 2021	25	Disc.: Kitt Peak Obs. Added on 29 January 2022	MPC · JPL
0	2001 YL164	MCA	19.6	360 m	multiple	2001–2017	23 Oct 2017	23	Disc.: SDSS	MPC · JPL
0	2001 YM164 = (887171)	HUN	19.40	390 m	multiple	2001–2021	10 May 2021	29	Disc.: SDSS	MPC · JPL
0	2001 YF165	MBA-I	18.3	650 m	multiple	2001–2019	24 Dec 2019	42	Disc.: Spacewatch	MPC · JPL
0	2001 YH165	MBA-O	17.1	2.1 km	multiple	2001–2019	24 Sep 2019	29	Disc.: Kitt Peak Obs.	MPC · JPL
0	2001 YM165	MBA-O	17.6	1.7 km	multiple	2001–2017	10 Dec 2017	24	Disc.: SDSS	MPC · JPL

back to top
