= List of unnumbered minor planets: 2001 U =

This is a partial list of unnumbered minor planets for principal provisional designations assigned during 16–31 October 2001. As of March 2026, a total of 115 bodies remain unnumbered for this period. Objects for this year are listed on the following pages: A–E · F_{i} · F_{ii} · G–O · P–R · S · T · U · V–W and X–Y. Also see previous and next year.

Near-Earth obj.	MBA (inner)	MBA (outer)	Centaur
Mars-crosser	MBA (middle)	Jupiter trojan	Trans-Neptunian obj.
Unclassified

== U ==
U	Designation	Class	Physical		Observations				Description and notes	Ref
U	Designation	Class	H	D	Opp.	Arc	Last	Used	Description and notes	Ref
9	2001 UO	APO	24.1	54 m	single	2 days	18 Oct 2001	14	Disc.: LPL/Spacewatch II	MPC; JPL
3	2001 UP	ATE	25.7	26 m	single	4 days	20 Oct 2001	39	Disc.: LINEAR	MPC; JPL
0	2001 UT	MCA	18.5	590 m	multiple	2001–2015	03 Dec 2015	109	Disc.: LINEAR	MPC; JPL
0	2001 UW	MCA	18.95	480 m	multiple	2001–2021	01 Nov 2021	35	Disc.: LINEAR	MPC; JPL
4	2001 UW2	MCA	20.69	240 m	multiple	2001-2015	21 Jan 2015	36	Disc.: Spacewatch	MPC; JPL
0	2001 UT4	MCA	18.2	960 m	multiple	2001–2019	15 Jan 2019	75	Disc.: AMOS	MPC; JPL
0	2001 UX4	APO	19.3	490 m	multiple	2001–2021	03 Oct 2021	209	Disc.: LINEAR	MPC; JPL
7	2001 UZ4	AMO	20.6	270 m	single	13 days	21 Oct 2001	24	Disc.: LINEAR	MPC; JPL
9	2001 UB5	AMO	21.9	150 m	single	3 days	21 Oct 2001	18	Disc.: LPL/Spacewatch II	MPC; JPL
5	2001 UC5	APO	21.3	200 m	single	6 days	26 Oct 2001	70	Disc.: LINEAR; AMO at MPC	MPC; JPL
7	2001 UD5	APO	22.7	100 m	single	23 days	11 Nov 2001	31	Disc.: NEAT	MPC; JPL
4	2001 UF5	APO	22.7	100 m	single	19 days	26 Oct 2001	48	Disc.: LINEAR	MPC; JPL
0	2001 US7	MBA-O	16.87	2.4 km	multiple	2001–2023	13 Jul 2023	58	Disc.: LINEAR; Alt.: 2012 TO232	MPC; JPL
0	2001 UB10	MCA	17.9	780 m	multiple	2001–2018	13 Nov 2018	39	Disc.: LINEAR; Alt.: 2009 KR6	MPC; JPL
7	2001 UN16	APO	23.4	74 m	single	31 days	21 Nov 2001	17	Disc.: LINEAR	MPC; JPL
4	2001 UO16	Asteroid	17.7	1.6 km	single	62 days	14 Dec 2001	111	Disc.: LINEAR; MCA at MPC	MPC; JPL
1	2001 UP16	AMO	20.7	260 m	multiple	2001–2012	13 Feb 2012	73	Disc.: LINEAR	MPC; JPL
0	2001 UQ16	AMO	21.54	200 m	multiple	2001-2024	09 Nov 2024	47	Disc.: LINEAR	MPC; JPL
7	2001 UT16	AMO	25.5	28 m	single	1 day	25 Oct 2001	9	Disc.: LINEAR	MPC; JPL
7	2001 UU16	APO	24.9	37 m	single	2 days	26 Oct 2001	24	Disc.: Spacewatch; AMO at MPC	MPC; JPL
9	2001 UA17	TNO	7.07	164 km	single	4 days	21 Oct 2001	8	Disc.: La Silla Obs. LoUTNOs, cubewano?	MPC; JPL
E	2001 UB17	TNO	8.0	119 km	single	1 day	18 Oct 2001	6	Disc.: La Silla Obs. LoUTNOs, plutino?	MPC; JPL
E	2001 UC17	TNO	7.6	143 km	single	1 day	18 Oct 2001	5	Disc.: La Silla Obs. LoUTNOs, plutino?	MPC; JPL
1	2001 UW17	AMO	20.5	280 m	multiple	2001–2014	23 Apr 2014	69	Disc.: NEAT	MPC; JPL
1	2001 UX17	MCA	17.8	820 m	multiple	2001–2017	19 May 2017	34	Disc.: NEAT	MPC; JPL
0	2001 UB18	MCA	17.72	1.6 km	multiple	1980–2022	03 Dec 2022	349	Disc.: Palomar Obs. Alt.: 1980 WT2	MPC; JPL
7	2001 UD18	APO	27.6	11 m	single	1 day	27 Oct 2001	9	Disc.: Spacewatch; AMO at MPC	MPC; JPL
8	2001 UE18	AMO	22.5	110 m	single	3 days	29 Oct 2001	15	Disc.: NEAT	MPC; JPL
0	2001 UG18	AMO	20.7	260 m	multiple	2001–2016	06 Dec 2016	158	Disc.: LINEAR	MPC; JPL
3	2001 UN18	TNO	6.5	167 km	multiple	2001–2013	06 Oct 2013	15	Disc.: Kitt Peak Obs. LoUTNOs, cubewano (cold)	MPC; JPL
4	2001 UP18	TNO	6.0	228 km	multiple	2001–2019	27 Nov 2019	24	Disc.: Kitt Peak Obs. LoUTNOs, twotino, BR-mag: 1.49; taxonomy: IR	MPC; JPL
6	2001 UO27	AMO	19.8	390 m	single	16 days	12 Nov 2001	21	Disc.: LINEAR	MPC; JPL
1	2001 UE40	MBA-O	17.89	1.5 km	multiple	2001-2022	26 Dec 2022	86	Disc.: LINEAR; Alt.: 2022 SU224	MPC; JPL
0	2001 UN41	MBA-M	17.2	2.0 km	multiple	2001–2019	21 Dec 2019	229	Disc.: LINEAR	MPC; JPL
2	2001 UL42	MBA-M	18.4	620 m	multiple	2001–2017	07 Nov 2017	78	Disc.: LINEAR	MPC; JPL
0	2001 UJ58	MBA-I	18.6	570 m	multiple	2001–2012	17 Nov 2012	52	Disc.: LINEAR; Alt.: 2012 SA2	MPC; JPL
1	2001 UW66	MBA-I	19.11	460 m	multiple	2001–2023	12 Sep 2023	42	Disc.: LINEAR	MPC; JPL
0	2001 UY66	MBA-M	17.8	1.2 km	multiple	2001–2018	03 Oct 2018	47	Disc.: LINEAR; Alt.: 2014 WS299	MPC; JPL
1	2001 UL69	MBA-I	18.81	510 m	multiple	2001–2019	24 Oct 2019	49	Disc.: LPL/Spacewatch II	MPC; JPL
0	2001 UQ70	MBA-I	19.65	350 m	multiple	2001–2020	22 Apr 2020	31	Disc.: LPL/Spacewatch II	MPC; JPL
0	2001 UE78	MBA-M	17.93	770 m	multiple	2001–2021	19 Apr 2021	45	Disc.: LINEAR; Alt.: 2005 QL147	MPC; JPL
0	2001 UX85	MBA-I	18.5	590 m	multiple	2001–2019	25 Nov 2019	59	Disc.: Spacewatch; Alt.: 2015 OM42	MPC; JPL
0	2001 UY87	MBA-M	18.3	840 m	multiple	2001-2023	07 Dec 2023	45	Disc.: Spacewatch	MPC; JPL
0	2001 UA90	MBA-I	18.9	490 m	multiple	2001–2020	05 Dec 2020	43	Disc.: Spacewatch; Added on 17 January 2021	MPC; JPL
0	2001 UU92	AMO	20.1	340 m	multiple	2001–2019	05 Jan 2019	168	Disc.: NEAT	MPC; JPL
0	2001 UB97	MBA-M	17.9	1.1 km	multiple	2001–2018	10 Jul 2018	118	Disc.: LINEAR; Alt.: 2014 SD148	MPC; JPL
1	2001 UC101	MCA	19.2	430 m	multiple	2001–2017	20 Aug 2017	41	Disc.: LINEAR	MPC; JPL
0	2001 UW102	MBA-I	18.8	520 m	multiple	2001–2018	03 Nov 2018	60	Disc.: LINEAR	MPC; JPL
0	2001 UN104	MBA-M	18.5	980 m	multiple	2001-2026	13 Oct 2026	29	Disc.: LINEAR	MPC; JPL
0	2001 UO111	MBA-M	18.1	1.0 km	multiple	2001–2018	02 Nov 2018	47	Disc.: LINEAR; Alt.: 2018 UB10	MPC; JPL
0	2001 UK114	MBA-M	17.9	780 m	multiple	2001–2020	27 Apr 2020	48	Disc.: LINEAR	MPC; JPL
0	2001 UQ115	MBA-M	17.6	1.3 km	multiple	2001–2018	30 Sep 2018	92	Disc.: LINEAR; Alt.: 2014 US94	MPC; JPL
0	2001 UC119	MCA	17.95	800 m	multiple	2001–2023	29 Mar 2023	92	Disc.: LINEAR	MPC; JPL
0	2001 UG124	MBA-M	18.0	1.4 km	multiple	2001–2019	23 Aug 2019	28	Disc.: NEAT	MPC; JPL
1	2001 UP126	MBA-M	18.87	1.2 km	multiple	2001-2023	09 Dec 2023	61	Disc.: LINEAR	MPC; JPL
1	2001 UX131	MCA	18.5	590 m	multiple	2001–2012	05 Dec 2012	35	Disc.: LINEAR; Alt.: 2012 TS302	MPC; JPL
0	2001 UW138	MBA-O	17.2	2.0 km	multiple	2001–2018	13 Mar 2018	55	Disc.: LINEAR	MPC; JPL
0	2001 UX140	MBA-M	18.25	650 m	multiple	2001-2022	29 Nov 2022	83	Disc.: LINEAR	MPC; JPL
0	2001 UB143	MCA	18.6	570 m	multiple	2001–2015	31 Dec 2015	111	Disc.: LINEAR; Alt.: 2008 SS245	MPC; JPL
0	2001 UE147	MBA-M	18.07	750 m	multiple	2001-2022	18 Dec 2022	73	Disc.: LINEAR	MPC; JPL
2	2001 UQ163	AMO	20.9	230 m	multiple	2001–2017	13 Nov 2017	83	Disc.: Spacewatch	MPC; JPL
1	2001 UX172	MCA	19.10	640 m	multiple	2001–2019	02 Jan 2019	55	Disc.: NEAT	MPC; JPL
0	2001 UV193	MBA-O	17.1	2.1 km	multiple	2001–2013	20 Jan 2013	25	Disc.: NEAT	MPC; JPL
0	2001 UY198	MBA-I	19.2	430 m	multiple	2001–2020	21 Jun 2020	43	Disc.: NEAT	MPC; JPL
0	2001 UB201	MBA-M	17.6	1.3 km	multiple	2001–2019	28 Dec 2019	39	Disc.: NEAT; Alt.: 2014 QJ168	MPC; JPL
0	2001 UJ206	MBA-M	18.0	750 m	multiple	2001–2016	28 Mar 2016	49	Disc.: Spacewatch	MPC; JPL
0	2001 UR208	MBA-I	18.6	570 m	multiple	2001–2020	25 Dec 2020	46	Disc.: LINEAR	MPC; JPL
1	2001 US208	MBA-M	18.7	760 m	multiple	2001–2018	10 Dec 2018	28	Disc.: LINEAR; Added on 22 July 2020; Alt.: 2015 BT217	MPC; JPL
0	2001 UT208	MBA-M	18.0	1.1 km	multiple	2001–2014	20 Sep 2014	34	Disc.: LINEAR; Alt.: 2014 SE4	MPC; JPL
3	2001 UY217	MBA-I	19.27	410 m	multiple	2001-2024	31 Jan 2024	20	Disc.: Spacewatch	MPC; JPL
0	2001 UD226	MBA-I	18.6	570 m	multiple	2001–2020	29 Jul 2020	33	Disc.: NEAT	MPC; JPL
0	2001 UL226	MBA-M	17.9	780 m	multiple	2001–2018	31 Dec 2018	34	Disc.: NEAT	MPC; JPL
0	2001 UX226	MBA-M	18.4	1.2 km	multiple	2001–2019	24 Oct 2019	29	Disc.: NEAT	MPC; JPL
1	2001 UN227	MBA-M	18.3	650 m	multiple	2001–2019	10 Jan 2019	25	Disc.: NEAT	MPC; JPL
–	2001 UH230	MBA-M	18.2	680 m	single	6 days	24 Oct 2001	9	Disc.: NEAT	MPC; JPL
2	2001 UF231	MBA-I	19.3	410 m	multiple	2001-2022	26 Nov 2022	42	Disc.: NEAT	MPC; JPL
1	2001 UH231	MBA-M	18.2	630 m	multiple	2001-2022	31 Oct 2022	34	Disc.: NEAT; Alt.: 2022 SR170	MPC; JPL
0	2001 UT231	MBA-I	18.4	620 m	multiple	2001–2019	28 Nov 2019	43	Disc.: NEAT; Alt.: 2012 VJ55	MPC; JPL
1	2001 UV231	MBA-I	18.2	680 m	multiple	2001–2016	07 Nov 2016	37	Disc.: NEAT	MPC; JPL
0	2001 UH232	MBA-I	18.7	540 m	multiple	2001–2019	02 Nov 2019	52	Disc.: NEAT	MPC; JPL
0	2001 UY232	MBA-O	16.62	2.6 km	multiple	2001–2021	25 Sep 2021	137	Disc.: Spacewatch	MPC; JPL
0	2001 US235	MBA-I	19.0	470 m	multiple	2001–2020	15 Dec 2020	39	Disc.: Spacewatch	MPC; JPL
1	2001 UT235	MBA-I	19.2	430 m	multiple	2001–2012	17 Nov 2012	32	Disc.: LPL/Spacewatch II	MPC; JPL
0	2001 UA236	MBA-M	18.31	650 m	multiple	2001–2021	08 May 2021	42	Disc.: NEAT	MPC; JPL
0	2001 UE236	MBA-I	18.7	540 m	multiple	2001–2021	14 Jan 2021	27	Disc.: NEAT	MPC; JPL
1	2001 UF236	MCA	18.6	570 m	multiple	2001–2015	03 Oct 2015	25	Disc.: NEAT	MPC; JPL
0	2001 UK236	MBA-M	16.8	2.4 km	multiple	2001–2021	15 Jan 2021	86	Disc.: NEAT	MPC; JPL
0	2001 US236	MBA-I	18.6	570 m	multiple	2001–2019	02 Nov 2019	69	Disc.: Spacewatch	MPC; JPL
0	2001 UH237	MBA-I	18.4	620 m	multiple	2001–2019	08 Nov 2019	53	Disc.: NEAT	MPC; JPL
0	2001 UJ237	MBA-I	18.9	490 m	multiple	2001–2019	04 Dec 2019	63	Disc.: LPL/Spacewatch II	MPC; JPL
0	2001 UP237	MBA-I	19.06	460 m	multiple	2001–2018	14 Dec 2018	59	Disc.: NEAT	MPC; JPL
2	2001 UQ237	MBA-I	18.7	540 m	multiple	2001–2019	28 Nov 2019	50	Disc.: LPL/Spacewatch II	MPC; JPL
2	2001 UV237	MBA-M	18.4	1.2 km	multiple	2001–2019	02 Nov 2019	44	Disc.: Spacewatch	MPC; JPL
0	2001 UD238	MBA-I	19.4	390 m	multiple	2001–2018	10 Nov 2018	44	Disc.: NEAT	MPC; JPL
0	2001 UK238	MBA-M	18.1	1.0 km	multiple	2001–2018	29 Nov 2018	36	Disc.: Spacewatch	MPC; JPL
0	2001 UL238	MBA-I	18.69	540 m	multiple	2001–2021	04 Aug 2021	45	Disc.: NEAT	MPC; JPL
0	2001 UN238	MBA-I	19.0	470 m	multiple	2001–2018	14 Aug 2018	34	Disc.: SDSS	MPC; JPL
0	2001 UO238	HUN	19.0	470 m	multiple	1995–2019	27 Oct 2019	37	Disc.: NEAT	MPC; JPL
0	2001 UP238	MBA-I	18.96	480 m	multiple	2001–2021	09 Jul 2021	54	Disc.: Spacewatch	MPC; JPL
1	2001 UT238	MBA-M	18.9	920 m	multiple	2001–2019	02 Nov 2019	36	Disc.: LPL/Spacewatch II	MPC; JPL
0	2001 UV238	MBA-I	18.91	490 m	multiple	2001–2021	01 Nov 2021	62	Disc.: Spacewatch	MPC; JPL
0	2001 UX238	MBA-I	19.0	470 m	multiple	2001–2018	17 Aug 2018	32	Disc.: Spacewatch	MPC; JPL
1	2001 UY238	MBA-I	19.3	410 m	multiple	2001–2018	05 Oct 2018	36	Disc.: SDSS	MPC; JPL
0	2001 UA239	MBA-M	18.7	540 m	multiple	2001–2019	25 Jan 2019	33	Disc.: NEAT	MPC; JPL
0	2001 UD239	MBA-M	18.7	760 m	multiple	2001–2018	12 Nov 2018	36	Disc.: LPL/Spacewatch II	MPC; JPL
0	2001 UE239	MBA-I	18.6	570 m	multiple	2001–2019	26 Jul 2019	32	Disc.: Spacewatch	MPC; JPL
0	2001 UG240	MBA-M	18.1	1.3 km	multiple	2001–2019	01 Nov 2019	52	Disc.: Spacewatch	MPC; JPL
0	2001 UJ240	MBA-M	18.5	1.1 km	multiple	2001–2020	23 Jan 2020	47	Disc.: Spacewatch	MPC; JPL
0	2001 US240	MBA-M	17.9	1.5 km	multiple	2001–2021	04 Jan 2021	37	Disc.: SDSS	MPC; JPL
2	2001 UT240	MBA-I	19.2	430 m	multiple	1995–2016	27 Aug 2016	28	Disc.: Spacewatch	MPC; JPL
0	2001 UV240	MBA-I	19.6	360 m	multiple	2001–2020	11 Sep 2020	43	Disc.: LPL/Spacewatch II; Added on 22 July 2020	MPC; JPL
0	2001 UA241	MBA-I	18.96	480 m	multiple	2001–2020	13 Sep 2020	31	Disc.: Spacewatch; Added on 19 October 2020	MPC; JPL
0	2001 UB241	MBA-I	19.0	470 m	multiple	2001–2020	06 Dec 2020	59	Disc.: SDSS; Added on 17 January 2021	MPC; JPL
1	2001 UE241	MBA-M	18.0	750 m	multiple	2001–2019	09 Feb 2019	22	Disc.: ADAS; Added on 17 January 2021	MPC; JPL
2	2001 UG241	MBA-M	18.4	620 m	multiple	2001–2019	28 Jan 2019	15	Disc.: NEAT; Added on 21 August 2021	MPC; JPL
1	2001 UH241	MBA-I	19.71	340 m	multiple	2001–2021	26 Oct 2021	50	Disc.: Spacewatch; Added on 21 August 2021	MPC; JPL

back to top
