= List of unnumbered minor planets: 2001 F (217–619) =

This is a partial list of unnumbered minor planets for principal provisional designations assigned during 16–31 March 2001. Since this period yielded a high number of provisional discoveries, it is further split into several standalone pages. As of May 2026, a total of 333 bodies remain unnumbered for this period. Objects for this year are listed on the following pages: A–E · F_{i} · F_{ii} · G–O · P–R · S · T · U · V–W and X–Y. Also see previous and next year.

Near-Earth obj.	MBA (inner)	MBA (outer)	Centaur
Mars-crosser	MBA (middle)	Jupiter trojan	Trans-Neptunian obj.
Unclassified

== F ==
U	Designation	Class	Physical		Observations				Description and notes	Ref
U	Designation	Class	H	D	Opp.	Arc	Last	Used	Description and notes	Ref
5	2001 FB217	MBA-O	18.2	1.3 km	multiple	2001-2019	28 Aug 2019	32	Disc.: Kitt Peak Obs.	MPC; JPL
1	2001 FC217	MBA-O	17.97	1.4 km	multiple	2001-2022	18 Oct 2022	53	Disc.: Kitt Peak Obs. Alt.: 2021 GP181	MPC; JPL
0	2001 FE217	MBA-O	17.7	1.6 km	multiple	2001–2021	18 Jan 2021	75	Disc.: Kitt Peak Obs.	MPC; JPL
5	2001 FF217	MBA-I	19.1	450 m	multiple	2001–2015	12 Aug 2015	17	Disc.: Kitt Peak Obs. Alt.: 2015 PC242	MPC; JPL
0	2001 FH217	MBA-M	18.12	1.2 km	multiple	2001-2021	29 Nov 2021	37	Disc.: Kitt Peak Obs. Alt.: 2019 GL139	MPC; JPL
5	2001 FJ217	MBA-M	18.08	980 m	multiple	2001-2008	22 Dec 2008	26	Disc.: Kitt Peak Obs. |	MPC; JPL
3	2001 FL217	MBA-I	29.72	200 m	multiple	2001-2023	27 May 2023	20	Disc.: Kitt Peak Obs.	MPC; JPL
–	2001 FN217	MBA-O	20.1	530 m	single	10 days	31 Mar 2001	17	Disc.: Kitt Peak Obs.	MPC; JPL
5	2001 FO217	MBA-M	19.03	860 m	multiple	2001-2017	25 Sep 2017	20	Disc.: Kitt Peak Obs.	MPC; JPL
–	2001 FP217	MBA-O	18.7	1.0 km	single	4 days	25 Mar 2001	10	Disc.: Kitt Peak Obs.	MPC; JPL
–	2001 FR217	MBA-M	20.1	530 m	single	2 days	23 Mar 2001	10	Disc.: Kitt Peak Obs.	MPC; JPL
5	2001 FS217	MBA-O	18.42	530 m	multiple	2001-2025	30 Oct 2025	27	Disc.: Kitt Peak Obs.	MPC; JPL
5	2001 FT217	MBA-O	18.27	1.3 km	multiple	2001-2022	14 Sep 2022	42	Disc.: Kitt Peak Obs. Alt.: 2022 QR16	MPC; JPL
0	2001 FU217	MBA-M	18.44	880 m	multiple	2001-2022	01 Mar 2022	50	Disc.: Kitt Peak Obs. Alt.: 2022 Au32	MPC; JPL
–	2001 FV217	MBA-I	20.7	220 m	single	10 days	31 Mar 2001	20	Disc.: Kitt Peak Obs.	MPC; JPL
0	2001 FW217	MBA-I	19.64	350 m	multiple	2001–2021	02 Oct 2021	38	Disc.: Kitt Peak Obs.	MPC; JPL
–	2001 FX217	MBA-I	20.9	200 m	single	9 days	30 Mar 2001	16	Disc.: Kitt Peak Obs.	MPC; JPL
–	2001 FY217	MBA-O	18.9	920 m	single	10 days	31 Mar 2001	19	Disc.: Kitt Peak Obs.	MPC; JPL
–	2001 FZ217	MBA-I	20.8	210 m	single	9 days	30 Mar 2001	13	Disc.: Kitt Peak Obs.	MPC; JPL
–	2001 FB218	MBA-M	18.4	880 m	single	9 days	30 Mar 2001	10	Disc.: Kitt Peak Obs.	MPC; JPL
–	2001 FG218	MBA-M	19.9	580 m	single	2 days	23 Mar 2001	10	Disc.: Kitt Peak Obs.	MPC; JPL
–	2001 FH218	MBA-O	19.2	800 m	single	4 days	25 Mar 2001	12	Disc.: Kitt Peak Obs.	MPC; JPL
–	2001 FJ218	MBA-M	19.6	510 m	single	10 days	31 Mar 2001	18	Disc.: Kitt Peak Obs.	MPC; JPL
0	2001 FK218	MBA-M	18.7	760 m	multiple	2001–2020	17 Oct 2020	39	Disc.: Kitt Peak Obs. Alt.: 2020 RB35	MPC; JPL
0	2001 FL218	MBA-I	19.10	450 m	multiple	2001–2022	27 Jan 2022	46	Disc.: Kitt Peak Obs.	MPC; JPL
0	2001 FN218	MBA-I	19.69	330 m	multiple	2001-2024	20 Jan 2024	42	Disc.: Kitt Peak Obs.	MPC; JPL
–	2001 FP218	MBA-I	21.0	190 m	single	10 days	31 Mar 2001	16	Disc.: Kitt Peak Obs.	MPC; JPL
–	2001 FQ218	MBA-I	20.0	300 m	single	10 days	31 Mar 2001	22	Disc.: Kitt Peak Obs.	MPC; JPL
0	2001 FR218	MBA-M	18.3	920 m	multiple	2001–2019	29 Jul 2019	48	Disc.: Kitt Peak Obs.	MPC; JPL
–	2001 FS218	MBA-M	18.3	920 m	single	10 days	31 Mar 2001	13	Disc.: Kitt Peak Obs.	MPC; JPL
3	2001 FT218	MBA-I	19.77	340 m	multiple	2001-2026	14 Apr 2026	26	Disc.: Kitt Peak Obs.	MPC; JPL
–	2001 FV218	MBA-O	17.3	1.9 km	single	9 days	30 Mar 2001	17	Disc.: Kitt Peak Obs.	MPC; JPL
–	2001 FX218	MBA-M	18.1	1.3 km	single	10 days	31 Mar 2001	13	Disc.: Kitt Peak Obs.	MPC; JPL
0	2001 FY218	MBA-I	19.18	430 m	multiple	2001–2021	30 Nov 2021	72	Disc.: Kitt Peak Obs.	MPC; JPL
0	2001 FZ218	MBA-M	18.23	1.2 km	multiple	2001-2022	26 Jan 2022	50	Disc.: Kitt Peak Obs. Alt.: 2012 TB6	MPC; JPL
0	2001 FB219	MBA-M	18.26	1.2 km	multiple	2001–2020	07 Sep 2020	41	Disc.: Kitt Peak Obs.	MPC; JPL
–	2001 FD219	MBA-O	18.8	970 m	single	10 days	31 Mar 2001	14	Disc.: Kitt Peak Obs.	MPC; JPL
–	2001 FE219	MBA-O	18.8	970 m	single	10 days	31 Mar 2001	14	Disc.: Kitt Peak Obs.	MPC; JPL
–	2001 FF219	MBA-O	17.9	1.5 km	single	4 days	25 Mar 2001	12	Disc.: Kitt Peak Obs.	MPC; JPL
–	2001 FG219	MBA-M	20.9	200 m	single	8 days	29 Mar 2001	14	Disc.: Kitt Peak Obs.	MPC; JPL
–	2001 FJ219	MBA-M	18.1	1.3 km	single	9 days	30 Mar 2001	10	Disc.: Kitt Peak Obs.	MPC; JPL
6	2001 FM219	MBA-O	19.9	580 m	multiple	2001–2009	19 Nov 2009	16	Disc.: Kitt Peak Obs.	MPC; JPL
–	2001 FN219	MBA-M	19.1	640 m	single	2 days	23 Mar 2001	10	Disc.: Kitt Peak Obs.	MPC; JPL
E	2001 FP219	MBA-M	19.2	610 m	single	10 days	31 Mar 2001	13	Disc.: Kitt Peak Obs.	MPC; JPL
3	2001 FQ219	MBA-I	19.0	470 m	multiple	2001–2020	15 Oct 2020	39	Disc.: Kitt Peak Obs. Alt.: 2020 RC32	MPC; JPL
–	2001 FR219	MBA-I	20.3	260 m	single	10 days	31 Mar 2001	14	Disc.: Kitt Peak Obs.	MPC; JPL
–	2001 FU219	MBA-M	19.1	640 m	single	9 days	30 Mar 2001	17	Disc.: Kitt Peak Obs.	MPC; JPL
6	2001 FW219	MBA-O	17.74	1.8 km	multiple	2001-2026	04 Nov 2026	12	Disc.: Kitt Peak Obs.	MPC; JPL
–	2001 FY219	MBA-I	20.2	270 m	single	10 days	31 Mar 2001	17	Disc.: Kitt Peak Obs.	MPC; JPL
–	2001 FZ219	MBA-I	20.6	230 m	single	10 days	31 Mar 2001	13	Disc.: Kitt Peak Obs.	MPC; JPL
–	2001 FB220	MBA-I	20.4	250 m	single	2 days	23 Mar 2001	10	Disc.: Kitt Peak Obs.	MPC; JPL
0	2001 FC220	MBA-I	19.97	280 m	multiple	2001 -2024	03 Nov 2024	38	Disc.: Kitt Peak Obs.	MPC; JPL
–	2001 FD220	MBA-O	18.5	1.1 km	single	2 days	23 Mar 2001	10	Disc.: Kitt Peak Obs.	MPC; JPL
–	2001 FE220	MBA-O	17.3	1.9 km	single	2 days	23 Mar 2001	10	Disc.: Kitt Peak Obs.	MPC; JPL
–	2001 FG220	MBA-M	18.3	1.2 km	single	2 days	23 Mar 2001	10	Disc.: Kitt Peak Obs.	MPC; JPL
–	2001 FJ220	MBA-M	18.3	920 m	single	9 days	30 Mar 2001	17	Disc.: Kitt Peak Obs.	MPC; JPL
0	2001 FK220	MBA-I	19.1	450 m	multiple	2001-2023	14 Jan 2023	20	Disc.: Kitt Peak Obs.	MPC; JPL
0	2001 FL220	MBA-I	19.5	370 m	multiple	2001–2018	17 Aug 2018	30	Disc.: Kitt Peak Obs.	MPC; JPL
–	2001 FM220	MBA-I	20.2	270 m	single	9 days	30 Mar 2001	17	Disc.: Kitt Peak Obs.	MPC; JPL
–	2001 FN220	MBA-M	19.1	450 m	single	8 days	30 Mar 2001	13	Disc.: Kitt Peak Obs.	MPC; JPL
0	2001 FP220	MBA-O	18.07	1.4 km	multiple	2001-2021	12 Jun 2021	43	Disc.: Kitt Peak Obs. Alt.: 2013 RS132, 2015 CY72, 2015 DE6	MPC; JPL
–	2001 FS220	MBA-I	20.7	220 m	single	7 days	29 Mar 2001	11	Disc.: Kitt Peak Obs.	MPC; JPL
–	2001 FT220	MBA-I	20.9	200 m	single	7 days	29 Mar 2001	10	Disc.: Kitt Peak Obs.	MPC; JPL
0	2001 FU220	MBA-O	17.4	1.8 km	multiple	2001-2023	09 Feb 2023	18	Disc.: Kitt Peak Obs.	MPC; JPL
–	2001 FV220	MBA-M	19.2	610 m	single	9 days	31 Mar 2001	15	Disc.: Kitt Peak Obs.	MPC; JPL
–	2001 FW220	MBA-O	17.9	1.5 km	single	8 days	30 Mar 2001	10	Disc.: Kitt Peak Obs.	MPC; JPL
–	2001 FX220	MBA-O	17.9	1.5 km	single	7 days	29 Mar 2001	10	Disc.: Kitt Peak Obs.	MPC; JPL
–	2001 FY220	MBA-M	19.5	530 m	single	9 days	31 Mar 2001	11	Disc.: Kitt Peak Obs.	MPC; JPL
0	2001 FC221	MBA-M	18.8	250 m	multiple	2001-2025	22 Jul 2025	35	Disc.: Kitt Peak Obs.	MPC; JPL
–	2001 FD221	MBA-O	17.9	1.5 km	single	7 days	29 Mar 2001	10	Disc.: Kitt Peak Obs.	MPC; JPL
–	2001 FE221	MBA-M	19.7	640 m	single	7 days	29 Mar 2001	11	Disc.: Kitt Peak Obs.	MPC; JPL
–	2001 FF221	MBA-O	18.6	1.1 km	single	9 days	31 Mar 2001	15	Disc.: Kitt Peak Obs.	MPC; JPL
0	2001 FG221	MBA-M	18.98	730 m	multiple	2001-2024	24 Oct 2024	45	Disc.: Kitt Peak Obs. Alt.: 2015 PX263	MPC; JPL
–	2001 FH221	MBA-I	20.0	300 m	single	8 days	30 Mar 2001	13	Disc.: Kitt Peak Obs.	MPC; JPL
0	2001 FK221	MBA-M	17.7	1.2 km	multiple	2001–2020	11 Nov 2020	121	Disc.: Kitt Peak Obs.	MPC; JPL
0	2001 FL221	MBA-I	18.8	520 m	multiple	2001–2020	15 Oct 2020	50	Disc.: Kitt Peak Obs. Alt.: 2013 TS202	MPC; JPL
–	2001 FN221	MBA-I	20.5	240 m	single	9 days	31 Mar 2001	14	Disc.: Kitt Peak Obs.	MPC; JPL
–	2001 FO221	MBA-O	19.1	840 m	single	7 days	29 Mar 2001	10	Disc.: Kitt Peak Obs.	MPC; JPL
–	2001 FP221	MBA-O	18.3	1.2 km	single	7 days	29 Mar 2001	11	Disc.: Kitt Peak Obs.	MPC; JPL
0	2001 FS221	MBA-O	17.6	1.7 km	multiple	2001–2019	27 Oct 2019	29	Disc.: Kitt Peak Obs.	MPC; JPL
–	2001 FU221	MBA-I	20.7	220 m	single	7 days	29 Mar 2001	10	Disc.: Kitt Peak Obs.	MPC; JPL
–	2001 FW221	MBA-O	18.4	1.2 km	single	9 days	31 Mar 2001	14	Disc.: Kitt Peak Obs.	MPC; JPL
–	2001 FY221	MBA-O	19.2	800 m	single	8 days	30 Mar 2001	10	Disc.: Kitt Peak Obs.	MPC; JPL
–	2001 FZ221	MBA-I	20.8	210 m	single	9 days	31 Mar 2001	14	Disc.: Kitt Peak Obs.	MPC; JPL
–	2001 FB222	MBA-M	18.1	1.3 km	single	8 days	30 Mar 2001	14	Disc.: Kitt Peak Obs.	MPC; JPL
–	2001 FC222	MBA-I	21.2	170 m	single	7 days	29 Mar 2001	11	Disc.: Kitt Peak Obs.	MPC; JPL
4	2001 FD222	MBA-O	17.68	1.6 km	multiple	2001-2023	20 Jan 2023	30	Disc.: Kitt Peak Obs.	MPC; JPL
5	2001 FE222	MBA-I	19.89	360 m	multiple	2001-2025	05 May 2025	24	Disc.: Kitt Peak Obs.	MPC; JPL
–	2001 FF222	MBA-O	19.2	800 m	single	9 days	31 Mar 2001	18	Disc.: Kitt Peak Obs.	MPC; JPL
0	2001 FG222	MBA-O	17.52	1.7 km	multiple	2001-2019	03 Oct 2019	45	Disc.: Kitt Peak Obs. Alt.: 2014 SP410	MPC; JPL
–	2001 FJ222	MBA-O	20.2	510 m	single	7 days	29 Mar 2001	11	Disc.: Kitt Peak Obs.	MPC; JPL
–	2001 FL222	MBA-M	19.4	730 m	single	7 days	29 Mar 2001	11	Disc.: Kitt Peak Obs.	MPC; JPL
–	2001 FM222	MBA-M	19.4	550 m	single	7 days	29 Mar 2001	11	Disc.: Kitt Peak Obs.	MPC; JPL
–	2001 FN222	MBA-I	19.9	310 m	single	9 days	31 Mar 2001	18	Disc.: Kitt Peak Obs.	MPC; JPL
–	2001 FP222	MBA-M	18.3	650 m	single	9 days	31 Mar 2001	13	Disc.: Kitt Peak Obs.	MPC; JPL
–	2001 FQ222	MBA-M	20.3	370 m	single	8 days	30 Mar 2001	10	Disc.: Kitt Peak Obs.	MPC; JPL
–	2001 FR222	MBA-O	18.6	1.1 km	single	7 days	29 Mar 2001	10	Disc.: Kitt Peak Obs.	MPC; JPL
5	2001 FS222	MBA-M	18.8	880 m	multiple	2001-2025	18 Jul 2025	20	Disc.: Kitt Peak Obs.	MPC; JPL
–	2001 FT222	MBA-M	18.7	540 m	single	9 days	31 Mar 2001	14	Disc.: Kitt Peak Obs.	MPC; JPL
–	2001 FU222	MBA-O	17.8	1.5 km	single	8 days	30 Mar 2001	14	Disc.: Kitt Peak Obs.	MPC; JPL
–	2001 FV222	MBA-O	18.3	1.2 km	single	7 days	29 Mar 2001	11	Disc.: Kitt Peak Obs.	MPC; JPL
–	2001 FW222	MBA-I	20.9	200 m	single	7 days	29 Mar 2001	10	Disc.: Kitt Peak Obs.	MPC; JPL
5	2001 FY222	MBA-O	18.08	1.2 km	multiple	2001-2025	01 Sep 2025	30	Disc.: Kitt Peak Obs.	MPC; JPL
–	2001 FZ222	MBA-I	19.0	470 m	single	8 days	30 Mar 2001	14	Disc.: Kitt Peak Obs.	MPC; JPL
–	2001 FA223	MBA-M	18.9	700 m	single	7 days	29 Mar 2001	11	Disc.: Kitt Peak Obs.	MPC; JPL
–	2001 FC223	MBA-O	19.9	580 m	single	7 days	29 Mar 2001	11	Disc.: Kitt Peak Obs.	MPC; JPL
–	2001 FD223	MBA-O	20.1	530 m	single	8 days	30 Mar 2001	14	Disc.: Kitt Peak Obs.	MPC; JPL
0	2001 FE223	MBA-O	17.4	1.8 km	multiple	2001–2020	11 Dec 2020	42	Disc.: Kitt Peak Obs.	MPC; JPL
–	2001 FG223	MBA-O	17.7	1.6 km	single	8 days	30 Mar 2001	10	Disc.: Kitt Peak Obs.	MPC; JPL
–	2001 FH223	MBA-O	18.6	1.1 km	single	9 days	31 Mar 2001	18	Disc.: Kitt Peak Obs.	MPC; JPL
4	2001 FJ223	MBA-I	19.5	370 m	multiple	2001-2016	04 May 2016	17	Disc.: Kitt Peak Obs.	MPC; JPL
–	2001 FL223	MBA-I	19.5	370 m	single	9 days	31 Mar 2001	18	Disc.: Kitt Peak Obs.	MPC; JPL
–	2001 FM223	MBA-O	18.1	1.3 km	single	8 days	30 Mar 2001	10	Disc.: Kitt Peak Obs.	MPC; JPL
–	2001 FN223	MBA-O	19.2	800 m	single	9 days	31 Mar 2001	11	Disc.: Kitt Peak Obs.	MPC; JPL
6	2001 FO223	MBA-O	18.83	1.0 km	multiple	2001-2003	31 Aug 2003	17	Disc.: Kitt Peak Obs.	MPC; JPL
–	2001 FP223	MBA-I	21.5	150 m	single	7 days	29 Mar 2001	10	Disc.: Kitt Peak Obs.	MPC; JPL
0	2001 FQ223	MBA-M	18.8	730 m	multiple	2001–2019	09 Aug 2019	35	Disc.: Kitt Peak Obs. Alt.: 2015 RU164	MPC; JPL
–	2001 FR223	MBA-O	18.0	1.4 km	single	7 days	29 Mar 2001	11	Disc.: Kitt Peak Obs.	MPC; JPL
–	2001 FT223	MBA-M	20.3	260 m	single	7 days	29 Mar 2001	11	Disc.: Kitt Peak Obs.	MPC; JPL
–	2001 FU223	MBA-O	18.4	1.2 km	single	8 days	30 Mar 2001	16	Disc.: Kitt Peak Obs.	MPC; JPL
–	2001 FV223	MBA-O	17.8	1.5 km	single	8 days	30 Mar 2001	14	Disc.: Kitt Peak Obs.	MPC; JPL
–	2001 FW223	MBA-O	18.9	920 m	single	9 days	31 Mar 2001	16	Disc.: Kitt Peak Obs.	MPC; JPL
–	2001 FX223	MBA-M	20.4	250 m	single	7 days	29 Mar 2001	11	Disc.: Kitt Peak Obs.	MPC; JPL
–	2001 FZ223	MBA-M	18.2	960 m	single	7 days	29 Mar 2001	11	Disc.: Kitt Peak Obs.	MPC; JPL
–	2001 FA224	MBA-M	19.0	880 m	single	9 days	31 Mar 2001	14	Disc.: Kitt Peak Obs.	MPC; JPL
–	2001 FB224	MBA-M	19.2	430 m	single	7 days	29 Mar 2001	11	Disc.: Kitt Peak Obs.	MPC; JPL
5	2001 FC224	MBA-O	18.35	1.5 km	multiple	2001-2026	11 Nov 2026	12	Disc.: Kitt Peak Obs.	MPC; JPL
6	2001 FD224	MBA-M	18.81	970 m	multiple	2001-2025	02 Jul 2025	13	Disc.: Kitt Peak Obs.	MPC; JPL
–	2001 FE224	MBA-M	19.2	800 m	single	9 days	31 Mar 2001	17	Disc.: Kitt Peak Obs.	MPC; JPL
6	2001 FF224	MBA-M	19.4	730 m	multiple	2001-2015	19 Apr 2015	18	Disc.: Kitt Peak Obs.	MPC; JPL
3	2001 FJ224	MBA-I	19.57	360 m	multiple	2001–2015	22 Jan 2015	25	Disc.: Kitt Peak Obs. Alt.: 2015 BX478	MPC; JPL
1	2001 FK224	MBA-M	18.9	700 m	multiple	1998–2015	03 Nov 2015	29	Disc.: Kitt Peak Obs.	MPC; JPL
–	2001 FM224	MBA-O	19.0	880 m	single	7 days	29 Mar 2001	11	Disc.: Kitt Peak Obs.	MPC; JPL
–	2001 FN224	MBA-M	18.3	1.2 km	single	7 days	29 Mar 2001	11	Disc.: Kitt Peak Obs.	MPC; JPL
7	2001 FO224	MBA-O	18.6	1.1 km	single	9 days	31 Mar 2001	15	Disc.: Kitt Peak Obs.	MPC; JPL
6	2001 FP224	MBA-I	20.4	250 m	multiple	2001–2014	24 Apr 2014	25	Disc.: Kitt Peak Obs.	MPC; JPL
0	2001 FR224	MBA-I	19.0	470 m	multiple	2001–2020	09 Sep 2020	39	Disc.: Kitt Peak Obs. Alt.: 2020 QA77	MPC; JPL
1	2001 FS224	MBA-M	18.64	560 m	multiple	2001-2921	04 Sep 2021	40	Disc.: Kitt Peak Obs. Alt.: 2015 HB240	MPC; JPL
–	2001 FT224	MBA-I	20.5	240 m	single	7 days	29 Mar 2001	11	Disc.: Kitt Peak Obs.	MPC; JPL
–	2001 FV224	MBA-M	18.6	570 m	single	8 days	30 Mar 2001	14	Disc.: Kitt Peak Obs.	MPC; JPL
–	2001 FX224	MBA-M	20.0	300 m	single	9 days	31 Mar 2001	18	Disc.: Kitt Peak Obs.	MPC; JPL
–	2001 FZ224	MBA-M	19.9	440 m	single	7 days	29 Mar 2001	11	Disc.: Kitt Peak Obs.	MPC; JPL
–	2001 FA225	MBA-O	19.6	670 m	single	7 days	29 Mar 2001	11	Disc.: Kitt Peak Obs.	MPC; JPL
–	2001 FB225	MBA-M	19.7	340 m	single	8 days	30 Mar 2001	14	Disc.: Kitt Peak Obs.	MPC; JPL
–	2001 FC225	MBA-I	20.2	270 m	single	9 days	31 Mar 2001	18	Disc.: Kitt Peak Obs.	MPC; JPL
–	2001 FE225	MBA-M	18.2	1.3 km	single	7 days	29 Mar 2001	11	Disc.: Kitt Peak Obs.	MPC; JPL
–	2001 FF225	MBA-O	18.4	1.2 km	single	9 days	31 Mar 2001	14	Disc.: Kitt Peak Obs.	MPC; JPL
5	2001 FG225	MBA-M	19.6	510 m	multiple	2001–2014	24 Apr 2014	22	Disc.: Kitt Peak Obs.	MPC; JPL
3	2001 FL225	MBA-O	18.31	1.2 km	multiple	2001-2025	24 Nov 2025	34	Disc.: Kitt Peak Obs.	MPC; JPL
–	2001 FM225	MBA-M	19.8	610 m	single	8 days	30 Mar 2001	10	Disc.: Kitt Peak Obs.	MPC; JPL
–	2001 FN225	MBA-M	19.9	580 m	single	7 days	29 Mar 2001	11	Disc.: Kitt Peak Obs.	MPC; JPL
–	2001 FO225	MBA-O	19.4	730 m	single	9 days	31 Mar 2001	14	Disc.: Kitt Peak Obs.	MPC; JPL
–	2001 FS225	MBA-I	21.6	140 m	single	7 days	29 Mar 2001	4	Disc.: Kitt Peak Obs.	MPC; JPL
–	2001 FT225	MBA-O	17.9	1.5 km	single	8 days	30 Mar 2001	13	Disc.: Kitt Peak Obs.	MPC; JPL
0	2001 FU225	MBA-M	18.7	760 m	multiple	2001-2023	21 Apr 2023	18	Disc.: Kitt Peak Obs.	MPC; JPL
–	2001 FV225	MBA-M	18.7	540 m	single	9 days	31 Mar 2001	11	Disc.: Kitt Peak Obs.	MPC; JPL
–	2001 FW225	MBA-O	19.4	730 m	single	7 days	29 Mar 2001	11	Disc.: Kitt Peak Obs.	MPC; JPL
–	2001 FX225	MBA-O	20.3	480 m	single	7 days	29 Mar 2001	11	Disc.: Kitt Peak Obs.	MPC; JPL
–	2001 FZ225	MBA-O	18.1	1.3 km	single	7 days	29 Mar 2001	10	Disc.: Kitt Peak Obs.	MPC; JPL
0	2001 FA226	MBA-O	17.64	1.7 km	multiple	2001-2023	07 Jun 2023	51	Disc.: Kitt Peak Obs.	MPC; JPL
1	2001 FB226	MBA-M	18.98	700 m	multiple	2001–2023	28 Jul 2023	60	Disc.: Kitt Peak Obs. Alt.: 2014 HV78	MPC; JPL
–	2001 FC226	MBA-O	18.8	970 m	single	9 days	31 Mar 2001	10	Disc.: Kitt Peak Obs.	MPC; JPL
0	2001 FD226	MBA-M	18.55	1.1 km	multiple	2001-2025	19 Aug 2025	51	Disc.: Kitt Peak Obs.	MPC; JPL
–	2001 FE226	MBA-O	18.4	1.2 km	single	9 days	31 Mar 2001	16	Disc.: Kitt Peak Obs.	MPC; JPL
–	2001 FF226	MBA-I	20.7	220 m	single	9 days	31 Mar 2001	15	Disc.: Kitt Peak Obs.	MPC; JPL
–	2001 FG226	MBA-M	20.5	440 m	single	9 days	31 Mar 2001	10	Disc.: Kitt Peak Obs.	MPC; JPL
–	2001 FJ226	MBA-M	19.5	700 m	single	9 days	31 Mar 2001	14	Disc.: Kitt Peak Obs.	MPC; JPL
–	2001 FK226	MBA-O	18.1	1.3 km	single	7 days	29 Mar 2001	11	Disc.: Kitt Peak Obs.	MPC; JPL
0	2001 FN226	MBA-M	18.6	800 m	multiple	2001-2024	309 Oct 2024	20	Disc.: Kitt Peak Obs.	MPC; JPL
–	2001 FO226	MBA-I	19.3	410 m	single	8 days	30 Mar 2001	16	Disc.: Kitt Peak Obs.	MPC; JPL
0	2001 FQ226	MBA-O	17.15	2.1 km	multiple	2001-2020	12 Sep 2020	38	Disc.: Kitt Peak Obs.	MPC; JPL
–	2001 FT226	MBA-M	18.8	730 m	single	9 days	31 Mar 2001	14	Disc.: Kitt Peak Obs.	MPC; JPL
–	2001 FV226	MBA-M	18.1	1.3 km	single	9 days	31 Mar 2001	13	Disc.: Kitt Peak Obs.	MPC; JPL
–	2001 FW226	MBA-M	18.4	620 m	single	8 days	30 Mar 2001	10	Disc.: Kitt Peak Obs.	MPC; JPL
1	2001 FX226	MBA-O	17.1	2.1 km	multiple	2001–2020	22 Sep 2020	33	Disc.: Kitt Peak Obs.	MPC; JPL
1	2001 FY226	MBA-O	17.88	1.5 km	multiple	2001–2021	10 Apr 2021	38	Disc.: Kitt Peak Obs.	MPC; JPL
–	2001 FZ226	MBA-M	18.6	800 m	single	9 days	31 Mar 2001	15	Disc.: Kitt Peak Obs.	MPC; JPL
–	2001 FA227	MBA-M	19.7	640 m	single	9 days	31 Mar 2001	10	Disc.: Kitt Peak Obs.	MPC; JPL
–	2001 FB227	MBA-M	18.5	1.1 km	single	9 days	31 Mar 2001	17	Disc.: Kitt Peak Obs.	MPC; JPL
3	2001 FC227	MBA-I	19.5	360 m	multiple	2001-2026	08 Jun 2026	30	Disc.: Kitt Peak Obs.	MPC; JPL
0	2001 FD227	MBA-I	19.17	440 m	multiple	2001–2021	08 Sep 2021	86	Disc.: Kitt Peak Obs. Alt.: 2015 XU202	MPC; JPL
4	2001 FE227	MBA-O	18.37	1.2 km	multiple	2001-2014	02 May 2014	28	Disc.: Kitt Peak Obs.	MPC; JPL
0	2001 FF227	MBA-M	18.3	650 m	multiple	2001–2018	12 Jul 2018	39	Disc.: Kitt Peak Obs.	MPC; JPL
–	2001 FG227	MBA-O	18.9	920 m	single	8 days	30 Mar 2001	16	Disc.: Kitt Peak Obs.	MPC; JPL
0	2001 FH227	MBA-I	19.6	360 m	multiple	2001-2024	11 Feb 2024	10	Disc.: Kitt Peak Obs.	MPC; JPL
–	2001 FJ227	MBA-I	20.7	220 m	single	9 days	31 Mar 2001	17	Disc.: Kitt Peak Obs.	MPC; JPL
–	2001 FK227	MBA-M	18.8	520 m	single	9 days	31 Mar 2001	14	Disc.: Kitt Peak Obs.	MPC; JPL
0	2001 FL227	MCA	20.2	270 m	multiple	2001–2020	17 Oct 2020	56	Disc.: Kitt Peak Obs. Alt.: 2011 BA146	MPC; JPL
1	2001 FM227	MBA-M	20.10	280 m	multiple	2001–2020	23 Oct 2020	35	Disc.: Kitt Peak Obs. Alt.: 2013 AO143	MPC; JPL
1	2001 FN227	MBA-O	17.93	1.3 km	multiple	2001-2025	17 Aug 2025	41	Disc.: Kitt Peak Obs.	MPC; JPL
0	2001 FQ227	MBA-I	19.48	340 m	multiple	2001-2025	26 Dec 2025	29	Disc.: Kitt Peak Obs.	MPC; JPL
–	2001 FS227	MBA-O	17.4	1.8 km	single	7 days	29 Mar 2001	11	Disc.: Kitt Peak Obs.	MPC; JPL
–	2001 FW227	MBA-I	20.6	230 m	single	9 days	31 Mar 2001	14	Disc.: Kitt Peak Obs.	MPC; JPL
6	2001 FX227	MBA-M	18.84	700 m	multiple	2001-2016	29 Oct 2016	66	Disc.: Kitt Peak Obs. Alt.: 2016 UL218	MPC; JPL
0	2001 FZ227	MBA-O	17.58	1.7 km	multiple	2001–2022	08 Jan 2022	43	Disc.: Kitt Peak Obs.	MPC; JPL
–	2001 FA228	MBA-O	18.2	1.3 km	single	8 days	31 Mar 2001	14	Disc.: Kitt Peak Obs.	MPC; JPL
–	2001 FC228	MBA-O	18.8	970 m	single	8 days	31 Mar 2001	10	Disc.: Kitt Peak Obs.	MPC; JPL
–	2001 FD228	MBA-O	17.5	1.8 km	single	7 days	30 Mar 2001	12	Disc.: Kitt Peak Obs.	MPC; JPL
–	2001 FE228	MBA-I	19.5	370 m	single	8 days	31 Mar 2001	12	Disc.: Kitt Peak Obs.	MPC; JPL
0	2001 FF228	MBA-O	17.76	1.5 km	multiple	2001-2024	06 Jun 2024	41	Disc.: Kitt Peak Obs.	MPC; JPL
–	2001 FJ228	JT	15.9	3.7 km	single	7 days	30 Mar 2001	10	Disc.: Kitt Peak Obs. Greek camp (L4)	MPC; JPL
–	2001 FL228	MBA-M	19.5	370 m	single	8 days	31 Mar 2001	14	Disc.: Kitt Peak Obs.	MPC; JPL
–	2001 FM228	MBA-I	20.3	260 m	single	8 days	31 Mar 2001	10	Disc.: Kitt Peak Obs.	MPC; JPL
–	2001 FN228	MBA-O	19.0	880 m	single	7 days	30 Mar 2001	10	Disc.: Kitt Peak Obs.	MPC; JPL
–	2001 FP228	MBA-I	20.3	260 m	single	8 days	31 Mar 2001	11	Disc.: Kitt Peak Obs.	MPC; JPL
–	2001 FQ228	MBA-O	17.9	1.5 km	single	8 days	31 Mar 2001	12	Disc.: Kitt Peak Obs.	MPC; JPL
0	2001 FT228	MBA-O	17.87	1.1 km	multiple	2001-2025	18 Aug 2025	41	Disc.: Kitt Peak Obs.	MPC; JPL
–	2001 FU228	MBA-O	18.1	1.3 km	single	8 days	31 Mar 2001	11	Disc.: Kitt Peak Obs.	MPC; JPL
–	2001 FV228	MBA-O	17.6	1.7 km	single	7 days	30 Mar 2001	10	Disc.: Kitt Peak Obs.	MPC; JPL
0	2001 FW228	MBA-I	19.5	360 m	multiple	2001-2025	17 Aug 2025	50	Disc.: Kitt Peak Obs.	MPC; JPL
–	2001 FY228	MBA-O	18.7	1.0 km	single	8 days	31 Mar 2001	11	Disc.: Kitt Peak Obs.	MPC; JPL
–	2001 FA229	MBA-M	18.0	1.4 km	single	8 days	31 Mar 2001	11	Disc.: Kitt Peak Obs.	MPC; JPL
0	2001 FB229	MBA-M	18.5	590 m	multiple	2001–2019	02 Nov 2019	34	Disc.: Kitt Peak Obs.	MPC; JPL
–	2001 FC229	MBA-O	19.8	610 m	single	7 days	30 Mar 2001	13	Disc.: Kitt Peak Obs.	MPC; JPL
–	2001 FD229	MBA-I	20.4	250 m	single	7 days	30 Mar 2001	11	Disc.: Kitt Peak Obs.	MPC; JPL
0	2001 FE229	MBA-I	19.23	450 m	multiple	2001–2025	05 May 2025	243	Disc.: Kitt Peak Obs.	MPC; JPL
–	2001 FG229	MBA-O	19.5	700 m	single	7 days	30 Mar 2001	11	Disc.: Kitt Peak Obs.	MPC; JPL
8	2001 FH229	MBA-O	18.1	1.3 km	single	8 days	31 Mar 2001	13	Disc.: Kitt Peak Obs. Alt.: 2001 FR233	MPC; JPL
–	2001 FM229	MBA-M	18.3	650 m	single	7 days	30 Mar 2001	10	Disc.: Kitt Peak Obs.	MPC; JPL
5	2001 FN229	MBA-O	18.15	1.1 km	multiple	2001-2025	22 Jul 2025	17	Disc.: Kitt Peak Obs.	MPC; JPL
2	2001 FO229	MBA-M	19.06	670 m	multiple	2001-2021	23 Mar 2021	22	Disc.: Kitt Peak Obs.	MPC; JPL
–	2001 FP229	MBA-M	19.6	360 m	single	8 days	31 Mar 2001	14	Disc.: Kitt Peak Obs.	MPC; JPL
–	2001 FQ229	MBA-O	18.5	1.1 km	single	8 days	31 Mar 2001	14	Disc.: Kitt Peak Obs.	MPC; JPL
–	2001 FR229	MBA-O	19.1	840 m	single	7 days	30 Mar 2001	10	Disc.: Kitt Peak Obs.	MPC; JPL
9	2001 FS229	MBA-O	18.7	1.0 km	single	8 days	30 Mar 2001	14	Disc.: Kitt Peak Obs.	MPC; JPL
–	2001 FT229	MBA-I	20.1	280 m	single	8 days	31 Mar 2001	11	Disc.: Kitt Peak Obs.	MPC; JPL
–	2001 FV229	MBA-I	19.7	340 m	single	8 days	31 Mar 2001	14	Disc.: Kitt Peak Obs.	MPC; JPL
0	2001 FW229	MBA-O	18.07	1.7 km	multiple	2001-2025	20 Nov 2025	55	Disc.: Kitt Peak Obs.	MPC; JPL
–	2001 FX229	MBA-M	18.0	1.1 km	single	2 days	31 Mar 2001	10	Disc.: Kitt Peak Obs.	MPC; JPL
–	2001 FY229	MBA-O	18.3	1.2 km	single	2 days	31 Mar 2001	10	Disc.: Kitt Peak Obs.	MPC; JPL
–	2001 FZ229	MBA-M	18.4	1.2 km	single	2 days	31 Mar 2001	10	Disc.: Kitt Peak Obs.	MPC; JPL
1	2001 FA230	MBA-M	17.9	1.1 km	multiple	2001–2019	29 Sep 2019	61	Disc.: Kitt Peak Obs. Alt.: 2015 TV213	MPC; JPL
3	2001 FB230	MBA-M	18.76	970 m	multiple	2001-2025	29 Jul 2025	32	Disc.: Kitt Peak Obs.	MPC; JPL
0	2001 FC230	MBA-M	18.1	1.3 km	multiple	2001–2017	25 Oct 2017	34	Disc.: Kitt Peak Obs.	MPC; JPL
–	2001 FG230	MBA-M	18.6	800 m	single	5 days	31 Mar 2001	12	Disc.: Kitt Peak Obs.	MPC; JPL
–	2001 FH230	MBA-O	18.7	1.0 km	single	2 days	31 Mar 2001	10	Disc.: Kitt Peak Obs.	MPC; JPL
–	2001 FK230	MBA-O	18.4	1.2 km	single	2 days	31 Mar 2001	10	Disc.: Kitt Peak Obs.	MPC; JPL
–	2001 FM230	MBA-O	17.9	1.5 km	single	10 days	31 Mar 2001	13	Disc.: Kitt Peak Obs.	MPC; JPL
–	2001 FO230	MBA-M	18.9	920 m	single	2 days	31 Mar 2001	10	Disc.: Kitt Peak Obs.	MPC; JPL
–	2001 FQ230	MBA-I	20.1	280 m	single	9 days	31 Mar 2001	13	Disc.: Kitt Peak Obs.	MPC; JPL
–	2001 FT230	MBA-O	17.4	1.8 km	single	2 days	31 Mar 2001	10	Disc.: Kitt Peak Obs.	MPC; JPL
–	2001 FU230	MBA-M	18.3	650 m	single	2 days	31 Mar 2001	11	Disc.: Kitt Peak Obs.	MPC; JPL
–	2001 FV230	MBA-O	18.9	920 m	single	2 days	31 Mar 2001	11	Disc.: Kitt Peak Obs.	MPC; JPL
–	2001 FW230	MBA-O	17.8	1.5 km	single	2 days	31 Mar 2001	11	Disc.: Kitt Peak Obs.	MPC; JPL
–	2001 FZ230	MBA-O	17.8	1.5 km	single	2 days	31 Mar 2001	11	Disc.: Kitt Peak Obs.	MPC; JPL
1	2001 FA231	MBA-O	18.20	1.3 km	multiple	2001–2021	30 Jun 2021	25	Disc.: Kitt Peak Obs.	MPC; JPL
1	2001 FB231	MBA-I	18.6	570 m	multiple	1995–2020	28 Jan 2020	64	Disc.: Kitt Peak Obs.	MPC; JPL
–	2001 FC231	MBA-O	19.2	800 m	single	2 days	31 Mar 2001	11	Disc.: Kitt Peak Obs.	MPC; JPL
–	2001 FH231	MBA-O	18.2	1.3 km	single	2 days	31 Mar 2001	11	Disc.: Kitt Peak Obs.	MPC; JPL
0	2001 FJ231	MBA-M	18.49	1.1 km	multiple	2001-2025	28 Oct 2025	69	Disc.: Kitt Peak Obs.	MPC; JPL
–	2001 FL231	MBA-M	19.5	530 m	single	2 days	31 Mar 2001	10	Disc.: Kitt Peak Obs.	MPC; JPL
3	2001 FM231	MBA-M	18.3	1.2 km	multiple	2001–2012	21 Oct 2012	23	Disc.: Kitt Peak Obs. Alt.: 2012 TP49	MPC; JPL
–	2001 FN231	MBA-O	18.9	920 m	single	2 days	31 Mar 2001	11	Disc.: Kitt Peak Obs.	MPC; JPL
9	2001 FO231	MBA-O	17.2	2.0 km	single	2 days	31 Mar 2001	13	Disc.: Kitt Peak Obs.	MPC; JPL
–	2001 FP231	MBA-M	18.6	800 m	single	2 days	31 Mar 2001	10	Disc.: Kitt Peak Obs.	MPC; JPL
–	2001 FQ231	MBA-M	19.4	550 m	single	2 days	31 Mar 2001	11	Disc.: Kitt Peak Obs.	MPC; JPL
–	2001 FR231	MBA-I	21.4	160 m	single	2 days	31 Mar 2001	11	Disc.: Kitt Peak Obs.	MPC; JPL
–	2001 FT231	MBA-O	19.0	880 m	single	6 days	31 Mar 2001	12	Disc.: Kitt Peak Obs.	MPC; JPL
–	2001 FU231	MBA-M	18.2	680 m	single	2 days	31 Mar 2001	10	Disc.: Kitt Peak Obs.	MPC; JPL
–	2001 FW231	MBA-M	17.8	1.2 km	single	2 days	31 Mar 2001	10	Disc.: Kitt Peak Obs.	MPC; JPL
–	2001 FX231	MBA-O	18.3	1.2 km	single	6 days	31 Mar 2001	12	Disc.: Kitt Peak Obs.	MPC; JPL
0	2001 FB232	MBA-M	17.6	1.7 km	multiple	2001-2023	14 Apr 2023	10	Disc.: Kitt Peak Obs.	MPC; JPL
–	2001 FC232	MBA-I	18.8	520 m	single	2 days	31 Mar 2001	10	Disc.: Kitt Peak Obs.	MPC; JPL
–	2001 FH232	MBA-M	17.4	1.4 km	single	2 days	31 Mar 2001	10	Disc.: Kitt Peak Obs.	MPC; JPL
–	2001 FJ232	MBA-O	19.1	840 m	single	2 days	31 Mar 2001	10	Disc.: Kitt Peak Obs.	MPC; JPL
0	2001 FL232	MBA-I	18.66	550 m	multiple	2001–2021	11 Nov 2021	40	Disc.: Kitt Peak Obs. Added on 9 March 2021	MPC; JPL
–	2001 FP232	MBA-M	19.6	510 m	single	10 days	31 Mar 2001	12	Disc.: Kitt Peak Obs.	MPC; JPL
–	2001 FQ232	MBA-I	19.7	340 m	single	5 days	26 Mar 2001	9	Disc.: Kitt Peak Obs.	MPC; JPL
0	2001 FR232	MBA-I	19.41	390 m	multiple	2001–2022	05 Jan 2022	51	Disc.: Kitt Peak Obs. Alt.: 2015 BK333	MPC; JPL
9	2001 FU232	MBA-O	19.1	840 m	single	5 days	26 Mar 2001	9	Disc.: Kitt Peak Obs.	MPC; JPL
1	2001 FX232	MBA-I	20.6	230 m	multiple	2001-2024	07 Dec 2024	9	Disc.: Kitt Peak Obs.	MPC; JPL
–	2001 FA234	MCA	22.2	110 m	single	2 days	23 Mar 2001	10	Disc.: Kitt Peak Obs.	MPC; JPL
–	2001 FC234	MBA-I	18.9	490 m	single	2 days	23 Mar 2001	10	Disc.: Kitt Peak Obs.	MPC; JPL
–	2001 FF234	MBA-O	20.1	530 m	single	4 days	25 Mar 2001	9	Disc.: Kitt Peak Obs.	MPC; JPL
–	2001 FG234	MBA-O	18.9	920 m	single	4 days	25 Mar 2001	8	Disc.: Kitt Peak Obs.	MPC; JPL
0	2001 FH234	MBA-M	18.44	1 km	multiple	2001-2022	26 Nov 2022	35	Disc.: Kitt Peak Obs. Alt.: 2020 HK109	MPC; JPL
–	2001 FJ234	MBA-M	20.1	530 m	single	4 days	25 Mar 2001	8	Disc.: Kitt Peak Obs.	MPC; JPL
3	2001 FK234	MBA-O	18.3	1.2 km	multiple	2001-2024	22 Oct 2024	12	Disc.: Kitt Peak Obs.	MPC; JPL
0	2001 FL234	MBA-M	18.86	710 m	multiple	2001–2021	28 Oct 2021	67	Disc.: Kitt Peak Obs.	MPC; JPL
0	2001 FR234	MBA-I	18.8	520 m	multiple	2001–2019	26 Sep 2019	41	Disc.: Kitt Peak Obs. Alt.: 2019 RB24	MPC; JPL
–	2001 FV234	MBA-I	19.5	370 m	single	4 days	25 Mar 2001	8	Disc.: Kitt Peak Obs.	MPC; JPL
–	2001 FY234	MBA-M	19.6	670 m	single	4 days	25 Mar 2001	8	Disc.: Kitt Peak Obs.	MPC; JPL
–	2001 FA235	MBA-M	18.8	730 m	single	4 days	25 Mar 2001	8	Disc.: Kitt Peak Obs.	MPC; JPL
–	2001 FE235	MBA-M	21.4	290 m	single	4 days	25 Mar 2001	8	Disc.: Kitt Peak Obs.	MPC; JPL
1	2001 FF235	MBA-O	17.90	1.5 km	multiple	2001–2021	01 Nov 2021	44	Disc.: Kitt Peak Obs. Added on 24 December 2021	MPC; JPL
–	2001 FH235	MBA-I	19.3	410 m	single	4 days	25 Mar 2001	8	Disc.: Kitt Peak Obs.	MPC; JPL
–	2001 FT235	MBA-I	21.5	150 m	single	4 days	26 Mar 2001	9	Disc.: Kitt Peak Obs.	MPC; JPL
–	2001 FM236	MBA-M	18.6	800 m	single	9 days	31 Mar 2001	11	Disc.: Kitt Peak Obs.	MPC; JPL
4	2001 FN236	MBA-I	19.4	390 m	multiple	2001–2017	22 Sep 2017	22	Disc.: Kitt Peak Obs.	MPC; JPL
2	2001 FB237	MBA-M	18.96	480 m	multiple	2001–2023	03 Sep 201923	151	Disc.: Kitt Peak Obs. Added on 29 January 2022	MPC; JPL
5	2001 FE237	MBA-O	18.2	1.3 km	multiple	2001–2015	08 Nov 2015	18	Disc.: Kitt Peak Obs. Added on 19 October 2020	MPC; JPL
–	2001 FU238	MBA-O	18.2	1.3 km	single	3 days	25 Mar 2001	9	Disc.: Kitt Peak Obs.	MPC; JPL
0	2001 FJ239	MBA-M	18.16	1.3 km	multiple	2001-2025	19 Aug 2025	32	Disc.: Kitt Peak Obs.	MPC; JPL
0	2001 FK239	MBA-M	18.7	1.0 km	multiple	2001–2020	19 Aug 2020	31	Disc.: Kitt Peak Obs. Alt.: 2015 KJ48	MPC; JPL
–	2001 FL239	MBA-O	18.8	970 m	single	5 days	31 Mar 2001	9	Disc.: Kitt Peak Obs.	MPC; JPL
–	2001 FN239	MBA-M	18.9	920 m	single	9 days	31 Mar 2001	10	Disc.: Kitt Peak Obs.	MPC; JPL
0	2001 FP239	MBA-I	19.2	390 m	multiple	2001-2016	19 Nov 2016	34	Disc.: Kitt Peak Obs. Alt.: 2016 TQ205	MPC; JPL
3	2001 FR239	MBA-I	19.3	410 m	multiple	2001–2017	13 Nov 2017	31	Disc.: Kitt Peak Obs.	MPC; JPL
0	2001 FS239	MBA-M	18.73	770 m	multiple	2001-2025	27 Aug 2025	53	Disc.: Kitt Peak Obs.	MPC; JPL
3	2001 FW239	MBA-O	18.26	1.2 km	multiple	2001–2021	26 Nov 2021	34	Disc.: Kitt Peak Obs. Added on 24 December 2021	MPC; JPL
2	2001 FD240	MBA-O	17.96	1.6 km	multiple	2001-2023	17 Sep 2023	27	Disc.: Kitt Peak Obs.	MPC; JPL
–	2001 FJ240	MBA-I	21.7	140 m	single	8 days	30 Mar 2001	10	Disc.: Kitt Peak Obs.	MPC; JPL
0	2001 FN240	MBA-I	19.46	380 m	multiple	2001–2021	31 Oct 2021	44	Disc.: Kitt Peak Obs. Added on 19 October 2020	MPC; JPL
1	2001 FT240	MBA-O	17.4	1.8 km	multiple	2001–2019	25 Sep 2019	26	Disc.: Kitt Peak Obs. Added on 17 January 2021	MPC; JPL
0	2001 FV240	MBA-M	18.7	760 m	multiple	2001–2020	24 Oct 2020	53	Disc.: Kitt Peak Obs. Alt.: 2001 FZ248	MPC; JPL
–	2001 FC241	MBA-M	19.7	640 m	single	7 days	30 Mar 2001	11	Disc.: Kitt Peak Obs.	MPC; JPL
2	2001 FF241	MBA-I	19.0	470 m	multiple	2001–2020	15 Oct 2020	44	Disc.: Kitt Peak Obs.	MPC; JPL
–	2001 FL241	MCA	22.4	98 m	single	9 days	30 Mar 2001	9	Disc.: Kitt Peak Obs.	MPC; JPL
0	2001 FN241	MBA-M	19.06	530 m	multiple	2001-2025	17 Oct 2025	33	Disc.: Kitt Peak Obs.	MPC; JPL
0	2001 FQ241	MBA-O	17.7	1.6 km	multiple	2001–2019	26 Sep 2019	41	Disc.: Kitt Peak Obs. Added on 22 July 2020	MPC; JPL
–	2001 FG242	MBA-M	20.2	270 m	single	5 days	31 Mar 2001	9	Disc.: Kitt Peak Obs.	MPC; JPL
–	2001 FL242	MBA-O	17.8	1.5 km	single	9 days	31 Mar 2001	10	Disc.: Kitt Peak Obs.	MPC; JPL
4	2001 FO242	MBA-M	18.8	520 m	multiple	2001–2019	03 Oct 2019	30	Disc.: Kitt Peak Obs. Alt.: 2011 UM229	MPC; JPL
0	2001 FA243	MBA-M	18.2	1.3 km	multiple	2001–2021	09 Sep 2021	40	Disc.: Kitt Peak Obs. Added on 30 September 2021; Alt.: 2021 QL23	MPC; JPL
1	2001 FD243	MBA-M	19.67	500 m	multiple	2001-2018	18 Mar 2018	35	Disc.: Kitt Peak Obs. Alt.: 2018 FJ7	MPC; JPL
2	2001 FH243	MBA-M	18.7	540 m	multiple	2001–2019	06 Sep 2019	35	Disc.: Kitt Peak Obs. Added on 11 May 2021; Alt.: 2011 SY52	MPC; JPL
1	2001 FL243	MBA-O	17.83	1.5 km	multiple	2001-2023	08 Sep 2023	43	Disc.: Kitt Peak Obs. Alt.: 2022 EH15	MPC; JPL
–	2001 FM243	MBA-O	18.2	1.3 km	single	8 days	29 Mar 2001	8	Disc.: Kitt Peak Obs.	MPC; JPL
0	2001 FR245	MBA-O	16.93	2.3 km	multiple	2001–2022	08 Jan 2022	58	Disc.: SDSS	MPC; JPL
0	2001 FT245	MBA-M	17.7	1.2 km	multiple	2001–2018	14 Mar 2018	34	Disc.: Spacewatch	MPC; JPL
0	2001 FU245	MBA-I	18.7	540 m	multiple	2001–2020	13 Sep 2020	37	Disc.: Spacewatch	MPC; JPL
0	2001 FK246	MBA-I	18.3	650 m	multiple	2001–2019	28 May 2019	55	Disc.: Spacewatch	MPC; JPL
0	2001 FL247	MBA-I	18.43	610 m	multiple	2001–2021	26 Nov 2021	47	Disc.: SDSS	MPC; JPL
0	2001 FM247	MBA-I	18.79	520 m	multiple	2001–2021	06 Nov 2021	46	Disc.: Kitt Peak Obs.	MPC; JPL
2	2001 FS247	MBA-M	18.5	1.1 km	multiple	2001–2019	28 May 2019	43	Disc.: Spacewatch	MPC; JPL
1	2001 FV247	MBA-O	17.1	2.1 km	multiple	2001–2019	22 Sep 2019	32	Disc.: SDSS	MPC; JPL
0	2001 FW247	MBA-M	17.86	1.5 km	multiple	2001–2021	31 Aug 2021	31	Disc.: SDSS	MPC; JPL
1	2001 FH248	MBA-I	19.1	450 m	multiple	2001–2019	14 Jan 2019	30	Disc.: Kitt Peak Obs.	MPC; JPL
3	2001 FK248	MBA-O	17.9	1.5 km	multiple	2001–2019	27 Oct 2019	25	Disc.: Kitt Peak Obs.	MPC; JPL
2	2001 FN248	MBA-M	18.6	800 m	multiple	2001–2020	21 Oct 2020	108	Disc.: Kitt Peak Obs. Added on 17 January 2021	MPC; JPL
2	2001 FP248	MBA-O	18.3	1.2 km	multiple	2001–2019	29 Oct 2019	22	Disc.: Kitt Peak Obs. Added on 17 January 2021	MPC; JPL
1	2001 FR248	MBA-M	17.4	980 m	multiple	2001–2019	02 Dec 2019	22	Disc.: SDSS; Added on 11 May 2021	MPC; JPL
2	2001 FT248	MBA-I	19.6	360 m	multiple	2001–2020	11 Nov 2020	24	Disc.: Kitt Peak Obs. Added on 17 June 2021	MPC; JPL

back to top
