= List of unnumbered minor planets: 2001 F (0–216) =

This is a partial list of unnumbered minor planets for principal provisional designations assigned during 16–31 March 2001. Since this period yielded a high number of provisional discoveries, it is further split into several standalone pages. As of May 2026, a total of 335 bodies remain unnumbered for this period. Objects for this year are listed on the following pages: A–E · F_{i} · F_{ii} · G–O · P–R · S · T · U · V–W and X–Y. Also see previous and next year.

Near-Earth obj.	MBA (inner)	MBA (outer)	Centaur
Mars-crosser	MBA (middle)	Jupiter trojan	Trans-Neptunian obj.
Unclassified

== F ==
U	Designation	Class	Physical		Observations				Description and notes	Ref
U	Designation	Class	H	D	Opp.	Arc	Last	Used	Description and notes	Ref
3	2001 FZ	AMO	21.0	220 m	single	210 days	20 Sep 2001	77	Disc.: LINEAR	MPC; JPL
7	2001 FE7	AMO	23.4	74 m	single	12 days	31 Mar 2001	21	Disc.: LINEAR	MPC; JPL
1	2001 FG24	MCA	20.8	210 m	multiple	2001–2020	14 Sep 2020	63	Disc.: Spacewatch	MPC; JPL
–	2001 FP32	APO	23.6	68 m	single	4 days	24 Mar 2001	15	Disc.: AMOS	MPC; JPL
–	2001 FZ32	MCA	20.7	220 m	single	6 days	29 Mar 2001	20	Disc.: Spacewatch	MPC; JPL
1	2001 FC33	MCA	18.4	620 m	multiple	2001–2021	11 Jun 2021	185	Disc.: LONEOS; Alt.: 2011 EE54	MPC; JPL
0	2001 FA58	APO	21.4	190 m	multiple	2001–2018	28 Mar 2018	99	Disc.: LONEOS; Potentially hazardous object	MPC; JPL
6	2001 FB58	AMO	21.6	170 m	single	21 days	13 Apr 2001	25	Disc.: LONEOS	MPC; JPL
1	2001 FC58	APO	20.6	300 m	multiple	2000–2025	06 Jun 2025	149	Disc.: LINEAR; Potentially hazardous object	MPC; JPL
3	2001 FR85	ATE	24.8	39 m	single	8 days	02 Apr 2001	36	Disc.: LINEAR	MPC; JPL
0	2001 FV85	MBA-O	16.8	2.4 km	multiple	2001–2021	28 Nov 2021	57	Disc.: Cerro Tololo; Added on 21 August 2021	MPC; JPL
4	2001 FG86	MBA-M	18.34	1.2 km	multiple	2001–2021	08 Sep 2021	31	Disc.: Cerro Tololo	MPC; JPL
1	2001 FB90	APO	20.14	350 m	multiple	2001-2023	07 Dec 2023	74	Disc.: AMOS; Potentially hazardous object/>Alt.: 2001 VM6	MPC; JPL
6	2001 FC90	AMO	21.4	190 m	single	18 days	13 Apr 2001	49	Disc.: LINEAR	MPC; JPL
0	2001 FF90	APO	17.27	1.2 km	multiple	2001–2022	14 Jan 2022	121	Disc.: AMOS; NEO larger than 1 kilometer	MPC; JPL
2	2001 FN127	MBA-M	19.0	880 m	multiple	2001–2020	24 May 2020	50	Disc.: Spacewatch	MPC; JPL
7	2001 FO127	ATE	27.5	11 m	single	19 days	18 Apr 2001	35	Disc.: Kitt Peak Obs.	MPC; JPL
0	2001 FR128	APO	19.88	370 m	multiple	2001–2023	13 Oct 2023	145	Disc.: LONEOS	MPC; JPL
2	2001 FU172	TNO	8.4	99 km	multiple	2001–2006	26 May 2006	31	Disc.: Kitt Peak Obs. LoUTNOs, plutino, BR-mag: 3.57	MPC; JPL
2	2001 FC181	MBA-O	17.4	1.8 km	multiple	2001–2018	16 Apr 2018	21	Disc.: Spacewatch; Added on 17 January 2021	MPC; JPL
2	2001 FH181	MBA-I	19.0	470 m	multiple	2001–2020	12 Apr 2020	57	Disc.: Spacewatch	MPC; JPL
E	2001 FB185	TNO	10.4	29 km	single	1 day	28 Mar 2001	4	Disc.: Kitt Peak Obs. LoUTNOs, cubewano?	MPC; JPL
E	2001 FC185	TNO	8.1	100 km	single	1 day	28 Mar 2001	4	Disc.: Kitt Peak Obs. LoUTNOs, other TNO	MPC; JPL
2	2001 FL185	TNO	7.1	126 km	multiple	2001–2018	10 Apr 2018	38	Disc.: Kitt Peak Obs. LoUTNOs, cubewano (cold), binary: 88 km	MPC; JPL
E	2001 FS185	TNO	7.7	99 km	single	57 days	22 May 2001	4	Disc.: Kitt Peak Obs. LoUTNOs, cubewano?	MPC; JPL
3	2001 FT185	TNO	7.9	109 km	multiple	2001–2016	13 Mar 2016	13	Disc.: Kitt Peak Obs. LoUTNOs, other TNO	MPC; JPL
7	2001 FV185	TNO	6.91	136 km	multiple	2001-2026	13 May 2026	73	Disc.: Kitt Peak Obs. LoUTNOs, plutino?	MPC; JPL
E	2001 FC193	TNO	8.6	65 km	single	1 day	28 Mar 2001	4	Disc.: Kitt Peak Obs. LoUTNOs, cubewano?	MPC; JPL
E	2001 FD193	TNO	8.1	82 km	single	1 day	28 Mar 2001	4	Disc.: Kitt Peak Obs. LoUTNOs, cubewano?	MPC; JPL
E	2001 FF193	TNO	7.7	99 km	single	1 day	28 Mar 2001	4	Disc.: Kitt Peak Obs. LoUTNOs, cubewano?	MPC; JPL
8	2001 FG193	CEN	7.6	105 km	multiple	2001-2019	13 Apr 2019	16	Disc.: Kitt Peak Obs.	MPC; JPL
E	2001 FJ193	TNO	9.3	65 km	single	1 day	28 Mar 2001	4	Disc.: Kitt Peak Obs. LoUTNOs, plutino?	MPC; JPL
4	2001 FJ194	TNO	7.39	120 km	multiple	2001-2013	16 Apr 2013	21	Disc.: Kitt Peak Obs. LoUTNOs, SDO	MPC; JPL
E	2001 FK194	TNO	8.9	92 km	single	8 days	30 Mar 2001	12	Disc.: Kitt Peak Obs. LoUTNOs, centaur	MPC; JPL
2	2001 FM194	TNO	7.5	119 km	multiple	2001–2019	06 Jun 2019	31	Disc.: Kitt Peak Obs. LoUTNOs, SDO, BR-mag: 1.19; taxonomy: BR	MPC; JPL
5	2001 FN194	TNO	7.69	83 km	multiple	1999-2026	30 Jun 2026	22	Disc.: Kitt Peak Obs. LoUTNOs, SDO	MPC; JPL
0	2001 FF197	MBA-M	18.3	920 m	multiple	2001–2020	14 Dec 2020	27	Disc.: Spacewatch; Added on 17 June 2021	MPC; JPL
–	2001 FH197	MBA-M	18.1	1.3 km	single	9 days	30 Mar 2001	16	Disc.: Kitt Peak Obs.	MPC; JPL
2	2001 FJ197	MBA-O	18.7	1.0 km	multiple	2001-2023	23 Apr 2023	38	Disc.: Kitt Peak Obs.	MPC; JPL
0	2001 FK197	MBA-M	18.26	960 m	multiple	2001-2025	26 Nov 2025	53	Disc.: Kitt Peak Obs.	MPC; JPL
0	2001 FM197	MBA-O	18.1	1.3 km	multiple	2001–2020	23 Jan 2020	43	Disc.: Kitt Peak Obs.	MPC; JPL
–	2001 FN197	MBA-M	20.5	240 m	single	9 days	30 Mar 2001	10	Disc.: Kitt Peak Obs.	MPC; JPL
5	2001 FP197	MBA-O	17.5	1.8 km	multiple	2001–2010	04 Feb 2010	20	Disc.: Spacewatch	MPC; JPL
2	2001 FR197	MBA-I	19.1	450 m	multiple	1999–2019	22 Oct 2019	42	Disc.: Kitt Peak Obs. Alt.: 2009 RV23	MPC; JPL
–	2001 FU197	MBA-M	18.7	1.0 km	single	10 days	31 Mar 2001	14	Disc.: Kitt Peak Obs.	MPC; JPL
4	2001 FW197	MBA-M	18.35	680 m	multiple	2001-2024	02 Jan 2024	22	Disc.: Kitt Peak Obs.	MPC; JPL
–	2001 FY197	MBA-O	18.4	1.2 km	single	8 days	29 Mar 2001	11	Disc.: Kitt Peak Obs.	MPC; JPL
2	2001 FA198	MBA-I	18.8	520 m	multiple	2001–2020	18 Sep 2020	44	Disc.: Kitt Peak Obs.	MPC; JPL
–	2001 FD198	MBA-I	20.6	230 m	single	10 days	31 Mar 2001	19	Disc.: Kitt Peak Obs.	MPC; JPL
–	2001 FG198	MBA-I	19.3	410 m	single	10 days	31 Mar 2001	12	Disc.: Kitt Peak Obs.	MPC; JPL
–	2001 FJ198	MBA-M	19.7	640 m	single	10 days	31 Mar 2001	13	Disc.: Kitt Peak Obs.	MPC; JPL
1	2001 FN198	MBA-M	18.4	1.2 km	multiple	2001–2017	09 Dec 2017	54	Disc.: Kitt Peak Obs.	MPC; JPL
6	2001 FO198	MBA-M	18.71	820 m	multiple	2001-2016	29 Oct 2016	90	Disc.: Kitt Peak Obs.v	MPC; JPL
–	2001 FP198	MBA-O	18.8	970 m	single	10 days	31 Mar 2001	19	Disc.: Kitt Peak Obs.	MPC; JPL
–	2001 FR198	HIL	17.9	1.5 km	single	10 days	31 Mar 2001	20	Disc.: Kitt Peak Obs.	MPC; JPL
0	2001 FS198	MBA-I	18.89	500 m	multiple	2001-2024	09 May 2024	45	Disc.: Kitt Peak Obs. Alt.: 2020 DH21	MPC; JPL
0	2001 FT198	MBA-I	19.59	340 m	multiple	2001-2024	08 May 2024	39	Disc.: Kitt Peak Obs.	MPC; JPL
–	2001 FV198	MBA-O	18.9	920 m	single	10 days	31 Mar 2001	16	Disc.: Kitt Peak Obs.	MPC; JPL
6	2001 FW198	MBA-M	19.16	800 m	multiple	2001-2025	29 Jul 2025	18	Disc.: Kitt Peak Obs.	MPC; JPL
0	2001 FX198	MBA-I	19.08	460 m	multiple	2001-2024	07 Oct 2024	40	Disc.: Kitt Peak Obs.	MPC; JPL
–	2001 FA199	MBA-I	19.5	370 m	single	10 days	31 Mar 2001	19	Disc.: Kitt Peak Obs.	MPC; JPL
–	2001 FE199	MBA-M	18.0	1.1 km	single	10 days	31 Mar 2001	10	Disc.: Kitt Peak Obs.	MPC; JPL
–	2001 FG199	MBA-M	19.6	670 m	single	10 days	31 Mar 2001	9	Disc.: Kitt Peak Obs.	MPC; JPL
1	2001 FH199	MBA-O	18.13	1.3 km	multiple	2001-2022	21 Jun 2022	34	Disc.: Kitt Peak Obs. Alt.: 2021 FN52	MPC; JPL
–	2001 FJ199	MBA-M	19.3	770 m	single	8 days	29 Mar 2001	10	Disc.: Kitt Peak Obs.	MPC; JPL
–	2001 FK199	MBA-M	19.3	410 m	single	8 days	29 Mar 2001	10	Disc.: Kitt Peak Obs.	MPC; JPL
2	2001 FM199	MBA-M	18.9	490 m	multiple	2001–2018	18 Jun 2018	22	Disc.: Kitt Peak Obs.	MPC; JPL
2	2001 FO199	MBA-O	18.04	1.6 km	multiple	2001-2025	28 Aug 2025	30	Disc.: Kitt Peak Obs.	MPC; JPL
–	2001 FP199	MBA-M	19.6	360 m	single	10 days	31 Mar 2001	16	Disc.: Kitt Peak Obs.	MPC; JPL
2	2001 FQ199	MBA-O	18.1	1.3 km	multiple	2001–2017	25 Apr 2017	48	Disc.: Kitt Peak Obs.	MPC; JPL
0	2001 FU199	MBA-M	17.9	1.5 km	multiple	2001–2017	25 Nov 2017	48	Disc.: Kitt Peak Obs. Alt.: 2012 TT92, 2012 TY323	MPC; JPL
4	2001 FW199	MBA-M	19.08	770 m	multiple	2001-2025	27 Aug 2025	38	Disc.: Kitt Peak Obs.	MPC; JPL
–	2001 FX199	MBA-I	21.0	190 m	single	10 days	31 Mar 2001	19	Disc.: Kitt Peak Obs.	MPC; JPL
–	2001 FY199	MBA-M	18.8	520 m	single	10 days	31 Mar 2001	17	Disc.: Kitt Peak Obs.	MPC; JPL
–	2001 FA200	MBA-I	20.0	300 m	single	9 days	30 Mar 2001	13	Disc.: Kitt Peak Obs.	MPC; JPL
–	2001 FB200	MBA-I	20.0	300 m	single	9 days	30 Mar 2001	10	Disc.: Kitt Peak Obs.	MPC; JPL
–	2001 FC200	MBA-M	18.5	1.1 km	single	10 days	31 Mar 2001	14	Disc.: Kitt Peak Obs.	MPC; JPL
–	2001 FD200	MBA-O	18.9	920 m	single	10 days	31 Mar 2001	18	Disc.: Kitt Peak Obs.	MPC; JPL
–	2001 FE200	MBA-O	17.7	1.6 km	single	8 days	29 Mar 2001	10	Disc.: Kitt Peak Obs.	MPC; JPL
0	2001 FF200	MBA-M	18.4	620 m	multiple	2001-2019	29 Jul 2019	15	Disc.: Kitt Peak Obs.	MPC; JPL
–	2001 FG200	MBA-O	19.3	770 m	single	8 days	29 Mar 2001	9	Disc.: Kitt Peak Obs.	MPC; JPL
4	2001 FH200	MBA-M	18.36	1.2 km	multiple	2001-2015	22 Apr 2015	36	Disc.: Kitt Peak Obs. Alt.: 2015 HB369	MPC; JPL
–	2001 FJ200	MBA-I	20.3	260 m	single	10 days	31 Mar 2001	17	Disc.: Kitt Peak Obs.	MPC; JPL
2	2001 FL200	MBA-I	19.1	450 m	multiple	2001–2017	17 Nov 2017	24	Disc.: Kitt Peak Obs.	MPC; JPL
–	2001 FM200	MBA-O	18.3	1.2 km	single	10 days	31 Mar 2001	13	Disc.: Kitt Peak Obs.	MPC; JPL
0	2001 FO200	MBA-O	17.8	1.5 km	multiple	2001-2024	04 Dec 2034	57	Disc.: Kitt Peak Obs.	MPC; JPL
–	2001 FP200	MBA-O	17.9	1.5 km	single	9 days	30 Mar 2001	20	Disc.: Kitt Peak Obs.	MPC; JPL
–	2001 FQ200	MBA-O	18.7	1.0 km	single	10 days	31 Mar 2001	21	Disc.: Kitt Peak Obs.	MPC; JPL
–	2001 FR200	MBA-M	19.8	460 m	single	9 days	30 Mar 2001	16	Disc.: Kitt Peak Obs.	MPC; JPL
1	2001 FS200	MBA-I	18.7	540 m	multiple	2001–2020	23 Aug 2020	53	Disc.: Kitt Peak Obs.	MPC; JPL
–	2001 FU200	MBA-O	19.4	730 m	single	8 days	29 Mar 2001	13	Disc.: Kitt Peak Obs.	MPC; JPL
2	2001 FW200	MBA-M	18.77	960 m	multiple	2001-2022	26 Nov 2022	41	Disc.: Kitt Peak Obs.	MPC; JPL
6	2001 FX200	MBA-M	18.3	1.1 km	multiple	2002-2008	30 Nov 2008	29	Disc.: Kitt Peak Obs.	MPC; JPL
–	2001 FY200	MBA-O	19.5	700 m	single	9 days	30 Mar 2001	13	Disc.: Kitt Peak Obs.	MPC; JPL
–	2001 FZ200	MBA-I	20.8	210 m	single	8 days	29 Mar 2001	14	Disc.: Kitt Peak Obs.	MPC; JPL
4	2001 FA201	MBA-I	19.54	370 m	multiple	2001-2019	06 Apr 2019	27	Disc.: Kitt Peak Obs.	9: MPC; JPL
0	2001 FB201	MBA-O	17.87	1.5 km	multiple	2001-2020	23 Oct 2020	29	Disc.: Kitt Peak Obs.	MPC; JPL
–	2001 FC201	MBA-I	21.0	190 m	single	8 days	29 Mar 2001	13	Disc.: Kitt Peak Obs.	MPC; JPL
–	2001 FD201	MBA-I	19.3	410 m	single	10 days	31 Mar 2001	21	Disc.: Kitt Peak Obs.	MPC; JPL
–	2001 FE201	MBA-O	18.2	1.3 km	single	10 days	31 Mar 2001	17	Disc.: Kitt Peak Obs.	MPC; JPL
–	2001 FG201	MBA-O	18.5	1.1 km	single	10 days	31 Mar 2001	21	Disc.: Kitt Peak Obs.	MPC; JPL
–	2001 FH201	MBA-I	19.1	450 m	single	2 days	23 Mar 2001	10	Disc.: Kitt Peak Obs.	MPC; JPL
–	2001 FJ201	MBA-O	19.1	840 m	single	10 days	31 Mar 2001	13	Disc.: Kitt Peak Obs.	MPC; JPL
1	2001 FL201	MBA-O	17.4	1.8 km	multiple	2001–2021	17 Jan 2021	39	Disc.: Kitt Peak Obs.	MPC; JPL
2	2001 FM201	MBA-M	18.9	490 m	multiple	2001-2023	17 Oct 2023	18	Disc.: Kitt Peak Obs.	MPC; JPL
0	2001 FN201	MBA-O	17.58	1.8 km	multiple	2001-2025	29 Jul 2025	43	Disc.: Kitt Peak Obs.	MPC; JPL
–	2001 FQ201	MBA-I	19.9	310 m	single	10 days	31 Mar 2001	17	Disc.: Kitt Peak Obs.	MPC; JPL
–	2001 FR201	MBA-O	18.8	970 m	single	10 days	31 Mar 2001	14	Disc.: Kitt Peak Obs.	MPC; JPL
–	2001 FS201	MBA-O	17.9	1.5 km	single	10 days	31 Mar 2001	17	Disc.: Kitt Peak Obs.	MPC; JPL
2	2001 FT201	MBA-M	17.1	1.1 km	multiple	2001-2019	29 Nov 2019	24	Disc.: Kitt Peak Obs.	MPC; JPL
–	2001 FX201	MBA-O	18.7	1.0 km	single	2 days	23 Mar 2001	10	Disc.: Kitt Peak Obs.	MPC; JPL
–	2001 FY201	MBA-M	19.5	370 m	single	10 days	31 Mar 2001	17	Disc.: Kitt Peak Obs.	MPC; JPL
–	2001 FA202	MBA-O	18.1	1.3 km	single	9 days	30 Mar 2001	13	Disc.: Kitt Peak Obs.	MPC; JPL
0	2001 FB202	MBA-M	18.66	760 m	multiple	2001-2022	01 Mar 2022	119	Disc.: Kitt Peak Obs. Alt.: 2012 XS88, 2016 UT212, 2018 EZ15	MPC; JPL
–	2001 FC202	MBA-O	18.3	1.2 km	single	10 days	31 Mar 2001	13	Disc.: Kitt Peak Obs.	MPC; JPL
–	2001 FE202	MBA-I	20.7	220 m	single	10 days	31 Mar 2001	11	Disc.: Kitt Peak Obs.	MPC; JPL
–	2001 FF202	MBA-O	20.0	560 m	single	8 days	29 Mar 2001	9	Disc.: Kitt Peak Obs.	MPC; JPL
–	2001 FH202	MBA-O	17.5	1.8 km	single	10 days	31 Mar 2001	17	Disc.: Kitt Peak Obs.	MPC; JPL
–	2001 FL202	MBA-O	18.5	1.1 km	single	10 days	31 Mar 2001	20	Disc.: Kitt Peak Obs.	MPC; JPL
5	2001 FO202	MBA-M	19.1	640 m	multiple	2001–2015	11 Aug 2015	22	Disc.: Kitt Peak Obs. Alt.: 2015 PV87	MPC; JPL
4	2001 FQ202	MBA-I	21.44	150 m	multiple	2001-2025	30 Mar 2025	25	Disc.: Kitt Peak Obs. Alt.: 2025 FW27	MPC; JPL
–	2001 FS202	MBA-I	19.2	430 m	single	10 days	31 Mar 2001	17	Disc.: Kitt Peak Obs.	MPC; JPL
2	2001 FV202	MBA-M	18.6	570 m	multiple	2001–2020	17 Oct 2020	44	Disc.: Kitt Peak Obs.	MPC; JPL
0	2001 FY202	MBA-I	18.8	520 m	multiple	2001-2024	13 Feb 2024	20	Disc.: Kitt Peak Obs.	MPC; JPL
–	2001 FZ202	MBA-O	18.4	1.2 km	single	10 days	31 Mar 2001	13	Disc.: Kitt Peak Obs.	MPC; JPL
–	2001 FC203	MBA-I	19.9	310 m	single	10 days	31 Mar 2001	13	Disc.: Kitt Peak Obs.	MPC; JPL
–	2001 FD203	MBA-O	18.5	1.1 km	single	8 days	29 Mar 2001	10	Disc.: Kitt Peak Obs.	MPC; JPL
–	2001 FE203	MBA-I	19.5	370 m	single	10 days	31 Mar 2001	10	Disc.: Kitt Peak Obs.	MPC; JPL
–	2001 FJ203	MBA-O	17.5	1.8 km	single	9 days	30 Mar 2001	9	Disc.: Kitt Peak Obs.	MPC; JPL
–	2001 FK203	MBA-O	18.3	1.2 km	single	10 days	31 Mar 2001	17	Disc.: Kitt Peak Obs.	MPC; JPL
–	2001 FL203	MBA-O	18.2	1.3 km	single	8 days	29 Mar 2001	13	Disc.: Kitt Peak Obs.	MPC; JPL
–	2001 FM203	MBA-O	17.0	2.2 km	single	2 days	23 Mar 2001	10	Disc.: Kitt Peak Obs.	MPC; JPL
–	2001 FO203	MBA-I	20.9	200 m	single	10 days	31 Mar 2001	13	Disc.: Kitt Peak Obs.	MPC; JPL
–	2001 FP203	MBA-M	18.8	970 m	single	9 days	30 Mar 2001	16	Disc.: Kitt Peak Obs.	MPC; JPL
–	2001 FR203	MBA-M	18.5	1.1 km	single	9 days	30 Mar 2001	15	Disc.: Kitt Peak Obs.	MPC; JPL
–	2001 FU203	MBA-I	19.0	470 m	single	2 days	23 Mar 2001	10	Disc.: Kitt Peak Obs.	MPC; JPL
–	2001 FV203	MBA-M	19.1	640 m	single	10 days	31 Mar 2001	19	Disc.: Kitt Peak Obs.	MPC; JPL
1	2001 FW203	MBA-O	18.0	1.4 km	multiple	2001-2023	08 Dec 2023	19	Disc.: Kitt Peak Obs.	MPC; JPL
–	2001 FB204	MBA-M	19.1	840 m	single	9 days	30 Mar 2001	10	Disc.: Kitt Peak Obs.	MPC; JPL
–	2001 FD204	MBA-M	19.4	390 m	single	9 days	30 Mar 2001	12	Disc.: Kitt Peak Obs.	MPC; JPL
1	2001 FF204	MBA-O	17.64	1.5 km	multiple	2001-2018	16 Jun 2018	27	Disc.: Kitt Peak Obs.	MPC; JPL
5	2001 FJ204	MBA-M	18.99	500 m	multiple	2001-2014	26 Apr 2014	34	Disc.: Kitt Peak Obs.	MPC; JPL
–	2001 FL204	MBA-M	20.1	400 m	single	8 days	29 Mar 2001	11	Disc.: Kitt Peak Obs.	MPC; JPL
2	2001 FO204	MBA-M	18.6	570 m	multiple	2001–2018	11 Aug 2018	47	Disc.: Kitt Peak Obs. Alt.: 2014 QU44	MPC; JPL
4	2001 FS204	MBA-M	18.55	1.2 km	multiple	2001-2024	11 Feb 2024	27	Disc.: Kitt Peak Obs.	MPC; JPL
–	2001 FT204	MBA-M	18.7	760 m	single	11 days	31 Mar 2001	20	Disc.: Kitt Peak Obs.	MPC; JPL
–	2001 FU204	MBA-O	17.4	1.8 km	single	8 days	29 Mar 2001	10	Disc.: Kitt Peak Obs.	MPC; JPL
0	2001 FV204	MBA-I	18.98	470 m	multiple	2001-2024	02 Dec 2024	52	Disc.: Kitt Peak Obs.	MPC; JPL
2	2001 FY204	MBA-O	17.9	1.5 km	multiple	2001–2019	27 Oct 2019	28	Disc.: Kitt Peak Obs.	MPC; JPL
–	2001 FZ204	MBA-I	22.0	120 m	single	2 days	23 Mar 2001	10	Disc.: Kitt Peak Obs.	MPC; JPL
1	2001 FA205	MBA-M	18.47	600 m	multiple	2001–2021	07 Apr 2021	40	Disc.: Kitt Peak Obs.	MPC; JPL
–	2001 FH205	MBA-I	19.1	450 m	single	8 days	29 Mar 2001	11	Disc.: Kitt Peak Obs.	MPC; JPL
–	2001 FJ205	MBA-M	19.5	370 m	single	10 days	31 Mar 2001	17	Disc.: Kitt Peak Obs.	MPC; JPL
–	2001 FL205	MBA-O	16.8	2.4 km	single	10 days	31 Mar 2001	13	Disc.: Kitt Peak Obs.	MPC; JPL
–	2001 FM205	MBA-O	18.0	1.4 km	single	10 days	31 Mar 2001	17	Disc.: Kitt Peak Obs.	MPC; JPL
–	2001 FN205	MBA-O	18.5	1.1 km	single	10 days	31 Mar 2001	17	Disc.: Kitt Peak Obs.	MPC; JPL
–	2001 FP205	MBA-O	17.9	1.5 km	single	10 days	31 Mar 2001	17	Disc.: Kitt Peak Obs.	MPC; JPL
0	2001 FQ205	MBA-O	17.58	1.5 km	multiple	2001-2024	06 Jul 2024	30	Disc.: Kitt Peak Obs.	MPC; JPL
2	2001 FR205	MBA-M	18.2	680 m	multiple	2001–2021	17 Jan 2021	72	Disc.: Kitt Peak Obs. Alt.: 2013 CD200	MPC; JPL
5	2001 FS205	MBA-O	17.78	1.2 km	multiple	2001-2025	30 Jul 2025	32	Disc.: Kitt 7P78ak Obs.	MPC; JPL
–	2001 FT205	MBA-M	18.2	1.3 km	single	9 days	30 Mar 2001	17	Disc.: Kitt Peak Obs.	MPC; JPL
–	2001 FU205	MBA-M	18.4	880 m	single	10 days	31 Mar 2001	21	Disc.: Kitt Peak Obs.	MPC; JPL
–	2001 FW205	MBA-I	19.7	340 m	single	9 days	30 Mar 2001	13	Disc.: Kitt Peak Obs.	MPC; JPL
–	2001 FX205	MBA-O	19.1	840 m	single	10 days	31 Mar 2001	18	Disc.: Kitt Peak Obs.	MPC; JPL
–	2001 FY205	MBA-O	17.8	1.5 km	single	10 days	31 Mar 2001	17	Disc.: Kitt Peak Obs.	MPC; JPL
–	2001 FZ205	MBA-O	20.6	420 m	single	9 days	30 Mar 2001	13	Disc.: Kitt Peak Obs.	MPC; JPL
0	2001 FA206	MBA-O	18.0	1.4 km	multiple	2001-2021	09 Dec 2021	18	Disc.: Kitt Peak Obs.	MPC; JPL
–	2001 FB206	MBA-I	19.1	450 m	single	10 days	31 Mar 2001	20	Disc.: Kitt Peak Obs.	MPC; JPL
4	2001 FJ206	MBA-M	18.5	1.1 km	multiple	2001–2021	26 Oct 2021	32	Disc.: Kitt Peak Obs.	MPC; JPL
1	2001 FK206	MBA-M	18.49	800 m	multiple	2001-2020	19 Aug 2020	38	Disc.: Kitt Peak Obs.	MPC; JPL
–	2001 FL206	MBA-I	20.0	300 m	single	10 days	31 Mar 2001	20	Disc.: Kitt Peak Obs.	MPC; JPL
0	2001 FN206	MBA-O	17.4	2.2 km	multiple	2001-2021	26 Novr 2021	53	Disc.: Kitt Peak Obs.	MPC; JPL
–	2001 FQ206	MBA-O	19.5	700 m	single	9 days	30 Mar 2001	9	Disc.: Kitt Peak Obs.	MPC; JPL
–	2001 FR206	MBA-O	17.8	1.5 km	single	10 days	31 Mar 2001	17	Disc.: Kitt Peak Obs.	MPC; JPL
–	2001 FS206	MBA-O	19.1	840 m	single	10 days	31 Mar 2001	19	Disc.: Kitt Peak Obs.	MPC; JPL
–	2001 FV206	MBA-I	20.7	220 m	single	9 days	30 Mar 2001	13	Disc.: Kitt Peak Obs.	MPC; JPL
–	2001 FW206	MBA-I	20.4	250 m	single	10 days	31 Mar 2001	16	Disc.: Kitt Peak Obs.	MPC; JPL
2	2001 FF207	MBA-O	17.8	1.5 km	multiple	2001–2019	06 Sep 2019	117	Disc.: Kitt Peak Obs. Alt.: 2019 PW5	MPC; JPL
–	2001 FJ207	MBA-O	18.7	1.0 km	single	10 days	31 Mar 2001	18	Disc.: Kitt Peak Obs.	MPC; JPL
–	2001 FL207	MBA-I	20.3	260 m	single	2 days	23 Mar 2001	10	Disc.: Kitt Peak Obs.	MPC; JPL
–	2001 FN207	MBA-O	18.5	1.1 km	single	10 days	31 Mar 2001	21	Disc.: Kitt Peak Obs.	MPC; JPL
3	2001 FP207	MBA-I	19.9	310 m	multiple	2001–2015	22 Jan 2015	27	Disc.: Kitt Peak Obs. Alt.: 2015 BW474	MPC; JPL
0	2001 FS207	MBA-M	18.12	1.3 km	multiple	2001–2021	12 Sep 2021	47	Disc.: Kitt Peak Obs.	MPC; JPL
1	2001 FU207	JT	15.7	4.0 km	multiple	2001-2023	29 Jan 2023	21	Disc.: Kitt Peak Obs. Greek camp (L4)	MPC; JPL
–	2001 FW207	MBA-M	19.1	840 m	single	10 days	31 Mar 2001	21	Disc.: Kitt Peak Obs.	MPC; JPL
5	2001 FX207	MBA-M	18.8	900 m	multiple	2001-2015	21 Apr 2015	20	Disc.: Kitt Peak Obs.	MPC; JPL
2	2001 FY207	MBA-M	18.9	490 m	multiple	2001–2018	09 Jul 2018	39	Disc.: Kitt Peak Obs. Alt.: 2014 QM102	MPC; JPL
–	2001 FZ207	MBA-O	18.4	1.2 km	single	2 days	23 Mar 2001	10	Disc.: Kitt Peak Obs.	MPC; JPL
1	2001 FA208	MBA-M	18.58	1.1 km	multiple	2001-2025	16 Aug 2025	48	Disc.: Kitt Peak Obs.	MPC; JPL
–	2001 FB208	MBA-I	19.8	330 m	single	9 days	30 Mar 2001	13	Disc.: Kitt Peak Obs.	MPC; JPL
–	2001 FD208	MBA-O	18.5	1.1 km	single	8 days	29 Mar 2001	13	Disc.: Kitt Peak Obs.	MPC; JPL
–	2001 FE208	MBA-O	18.6	1.1 km	single	10 days	31 Mar 2001	17	Disc.: Kitt Peak Obs.	MPC; JPL
0	2001 FF208	MBA-O	18.5	1.1 km	multiple	2001–2016	03 May 2016	36	Disc.: Kitt Peak Obs. Alt.: 2003 SP424	MPC; JPL
–	2001 FH208	MBA-I	20.5	240 m	single	10 days	31 Mar 2001	21	Disc.: Kitt Peak Obs.	MPC; JPL
–	2001 FK208	MBA-M	19.9	310 m	single	8 days	29 Mar 2001	14	Disc.: Kitt Peak Obs.	MPC; JPL
0	2001 FL208	MBA-I	18.63	570 m	multiple	2001-2022	07 Jan 2022	74	Disc.: Kitt Peak Obs. Alt.: 2015 BG165	MPC; JPL
–	2001 FN208	MBA-I	21.1	180 m	single	9 days	30 Mar 2001	10	Disc.: Kitt Peak Obs.	MPC; JPL
–	2001 FO208	MBA-I	20.6	230 m	single	9 days	30 Mar 2001	13	Disc.: Kitt Peak Obs.	MPC; JPL
0	2001 FP208	MBA-M	18.22	1.3 km	multiple	2001-2022	26 Nov 2022	43	Disc.: Kitt Peak Obs.	MPC; JPL
–	2001 FR208	MBA-O	18.6	1.1 km	single	10 days	31 Mar 2001	15	Disc.: Kitt Peak Obs.	MPC; JPL
–	2001 FV208	MBA-O	18.8	970 m	single	10 days	31 Mar 2001	21	Disc.: Kitt Peak Obs.	MPC; JPL
–	2001 FW208	MBA-O	18.0	1.4 km	single	9 days	30 Mar 2001	16	Disc.: Kitt Peak Obs.	MPC; JPL
–	2001 FZ208	MBA-O	18.8	970 m	single	2 days	23 Mar 2001	10	Disc.: Kitt Peak Obs.	MPC; JPL
–	2001 FB209	MBA-M	18.5	1.1 km	single	10 days	31 Mar 2001	14	Disc.: Kitt Peak Obs.	MPC; JPL
–	2001 FC209	MBA-O	17.4	1.8 km	single	2 days	23 Mar 2001	10	Disc.: Kitt Peak Obs.	MPC; JPL
0	2001 FD209	MCA	19.14	440 m	multiple	2001–2021	26 Nov 2021	61	Disc.: Kitt Peak Obs. Alt.: 2014 HN46	MPC; JPL
0	2001 FF209	MBA-O	17.54	1.7 km	multiple	2001–2021	28 Nov 2021	34	Disc.: Kitt Peak Obs.	MPC; JPL
5	2001 FJ209	MBA-M	18.7	1.0 km	multiple	2001–2019	07 Apr 2019	39	Disc.: Kitt Peak Obs. Alt.: 2019 FW21	MPC; JPL
–	2001 FK209	MBA-O	18.5	1.1 km	single	10 days	31 Mar 2001	21	Disc.: Kitt Peak Obs.	MPC; JPL
–	2001 FL209	MBA-M	18.4	1.2 km	single	10 days	31 Mar 2001	15	Disc.: Kitt Peak Obs.	MPC; JPL
–	2001 FN209	MBA-I	20.8	210 m	single	8 days	29 Mar 2001	14	Disc.: Kitt Peak Obs.	MPC; JPL
–	2001 FO209	MBA-M	18.8	730 m	single	10 days	31 Mar 2001	21	Disc.: Kitt Peak Obs.	MPC; JPL
–	2001 FP209	MBA-M	18.9	490 m	single	10 days	31 Mar 2001	15	Disc.: Kitt Peak Obs.	MPC; JPL
–	2001 FR209	MBA-O	18.6	1.1 km	single	8 days	29 Mar 2001	10	Disc.: Kitt Peak Obs.	MPC; JPL
–	2001 FT209	MBA-I	20.8	210 m	single	9 days	30 Mar 2001	17	Disc.: Kitt Peak Obs.	MPC; JPL
–	2001 FU209	MBA-O	18.2	1.3 km	single	2 days	23 Mar 2001	10	Disc.: Kitt Peak Obs.	MPC; JPL
–	2001 FW209	MBA-M	18.4	1.2 km	single	10 days	31 Mar 2001	17	Disc.: Kitt Peak Obs.	MPC; JPL
–	2001 FX209	MBA-O	18.3	1.2 km	single	8 days	29 Mar 2001	13	Disc.: Kitt Peak Obs.	MPC; JPL
–	2001 FZ209	MBA-O	18.8	970 m	single	10 days	31 Mar 2001	17	Disc.: Kitt Peak Obs.	MPC; JPL
5	2001 FA210	MBA-O	17.5	1.8 km	multiple	2001–2017	19 Mar 2017	26	Disc.: Kitt Peak Obs. Alt.: 2017 FG33	MPC; JPL
4	2001 FB210	MBA-O	18.33	1.1 km	multiple	2001-2023	04 Dec 2023	29	Disc.: Kitt Peak Obs.	MPC; JPL
–	2001 FC210	MBA-I	19.2	430 m	single	2 days	23 Mar 2001	10	Disc.: Kitt Peak Obs.	MPC; JPL
–	2001 FD210	MBA-O	18.4	1.2 km	single	10 days	31 Mar 2001	18	Disc.: Kitt Peak Obs.	MPC; JPL
–	2001 FF210	MBA-I	20.1	280 m	single	8 days	29 Mar 2001	11	Disc.: Kitt Peak Obs.	MPC; JPL
–	2001 FG210	MBA-M	19.5	370 m	single	2 days	23 Mar 2001	10	Disc.: Kitt Peak Obs.	MPC; JPL
–	2001 FH210	MBA-M	18.3	920 m	single	10 days	31 Mar 2001	17	Disc.: Kitt Peak Obs.	MPC; JPL
–	2001 FJ210	MBA-O	19.6	670 m	single	10 days	31 Mar 2001	11	Disc.: Kitt Peak Obs.	MPC; JPL
–	2001 FK210	MBA-M	21.3	230 m	single	9 days	30 Mar 2001	17	Disc.: Kitt Peak Obs.	MPC; JPL
4	2001 FM210	MBA-M	18.89	730 m	multiple	2001-2025	01 Jul 2025	23	Disc.: Kitt Peak Obs.	MPC; JPL
3	2001 FN210	MBA-O	19.37	700 m	multiple	2001-2017	25 Mar 2017	34	Disc.: Kitt Peak Obs. Alt.: 2017 FU250	MPC; JPL
–	2001 FR210	MBA-M	18.5	840 m	single	9 days	30 Mar 2001	10	Disc.: Kitt Peak Obs.	MPC; JPL
–	2001 FU210	MBA-O	18.6	1.1 km	single	10 days	31 Mar 2001	17	Disc.: Kitt Peak Obs.	MPC; JPL
–	2001 FV210	MBA-M	18.7	760 m	single	10 days	31 Mar 2001	20	Disc.: Kitt Peak Obs.	MPC; JPL
0	2001 FW210	MBA-O	18.9	920 m	multiple	2001-2024	28 Sep 2024	17	Disc.: Kitt Peak Obs.	MPC; JPL
–	2001 FY210	MBA-O	18.2	1.3 km	single	10 days	31 Mar 2001	17	Disc.: Kitt Peak Obs.	MPC; JPL
–	2001 FZ210	MBA-M	20.1	280 m	single	10 days	31 Mar 2001	24	Disc.: Kitt Peak Obs.	MPC; JPL
0	2001 FA211	[MBA-O]	17.92	1 km	multiple	2001-2022	19 Sep 2022	46	Disc.: Kitt Peak Obs. Alt.: 2001 FF249	MPC; JPL
–	2001 FE211	MBA-M	20.9	370 m	single	2 days	23 Mar 2001	10	Disc.: Kitt Peak Obs.	MPC; JPL
1	2001 FF211	MBA-M	18.0	1.1 km	multiple	2001–2019	02 Jul 2019	48	Disc.: Kitt Peak Obs.	MPC; JPL
–	2001 FG211	MBA-O	18.0	1.4 km	single	9 days	30 Mar 2001	13	Disc.: Kitt Peak Obs.	MPC; JPL
–	2001 FH211	MBA-M	19.0	670 m	single	9 days	30 Mar 2001	17	Disc.: Kitt Peak Obs.	MPC; JPL
–	2001 FK211	MBA-O	18.6	1.1 km	single	10 days	31 Mar 2001	17	Disc.: Kitt Peak Obs.	MPC; JPL
0	2001 FM211	MBA-O	18.44	1.1 km	multiple	2001–2021	30 May 2021	37	Disc.: Kitt Peak Obs.	MPC; JPL
0	2001 FQ211	MBA-M	18.46	1.4 km	multiple	2001-2025	29 Mar 2025	37	Disc.: Kitt Peak Obs.	MPC; JPL
–	2001 FR211	MBA-O	18.0	1.4 km	single	10 days	31 Mar 2001	11	Disc.: Kitt Peak Obs.	MPC; JPL
–	2001 FS211	MBA-M	18.9	490 m	single	10 days	31 Mar 2001	17	Disc.: Kitt Peak Obs.	MPC; JPL
–	2001 FT211	MBA-I	20.2	270 m	single	10 days	31 Mar 2001	17	Disc.: Kitt Peak Obs.	MPC; JPL
–	2001 FU211	MBA-O	18.5	1.1 km	single	10 days	31 Mar 2001	13	Disc.: Kitt Peak Obs.	MPC; JPL
–	2001 FW211	MBA-O	18.3	1.2 km	single	10 days	31 Mar 2001	14	Disc.: Kitt Peak Obs.	MPC; JPL
1	2001 FB212	MBA-I	18.7	540 m	multiple	2001–2019	28 Dec 2019	40	Disc.: Kitt Peak Obs.	MPC; JPL
–	2001 FC212	MBA-M	19.3	770 m	single	10 days	31 Mar 2001	18	Disc.: Kitt Peak Obs.	MPC; JPL
–	2001 FE212	MBA-M	19.7	480 m	single	10 days	31 Mar 2001	14	Disc.: Kitt Peak Obs.	MPC; JPL
–	2001 FG212	MBA-I	20.0	300 m	single	9 days	30 Mar 2001	17	Disc.: Kitt Peak Obs.	MPC; JPL
1	2001 FL212	MBA-O	17.66	1.6 km	multiple	2001-2022	31 Jan 2022	24	Disc.: Kitt Peak Obs.	MPC; JPL
1	2001 FN212	MBA-O	18.13	1.2 km	multiple	2001-2022	25 Apr 2022	36	Disc.: Kitt Peak Obs. Alt.: 2022 FK13	MPC; JPL
–	2001 FP212	MBA-O	18.6	1.1 km	single	10 days	31 Mar 2001	17	Disc.: Kitt Peak Obs.	MPC; JPL
–	2001 FQ212	MBA-M	20.1	280 m	single	9 days	30 Mar 2001	10	Disc.: Kitt Peak Obs.	MPC; JPL
–	2001 FR212	MBA-O	19.1	840 m	single	10 days	31 Mar 2001	21	Disc.: Kitt Peak Obs.	MPC; JPL
–	2001 FU212	MBA-O	18.9	920 m	single	10 days	31 Mar 2001	18	Disc.: Kitt Peak Obs.	MPC; JPL
–	2001 FV212	MBA-O	18.9	920 m	single	10 days	31 Mar 2001	21	Disc.: Kitt Peak Obs.	MPC; JPL
–	2001 FW212	HIL	17.8	1.5 km	single	10 days	31 Mar 2001	18	Disc.: Kitt Peak Obs.	MPC; JPL
4	2001 FX212	MBA-M	18.34	700 m	multiple	2001-2018	27 Jan 2018	35	Disc.: Kitt Peak Obs.	MPC; JPL
–	2001 FY212	MBA-M	19.3	410 m	single	8 days	29 Mar 2001	10	Disc.: Kitt Peak Obs.	MPC; JPL
0	2001 FZ212	MBA-I	18.9	490 m	multiple	2001–2017	09 Dec 2017	41	Disc.: Kitt Peak Obs.	MPC; JPL
–	2001 FA213	MBA-M	19.7	340 m	single	4 days	25 Mar 2001	7	Disc.: Kitt Peak Obs.	MPC; JPL
–	2001 FB213	MBA-O	18.2	1.3 km	single	2 days	23 Mar 2001	10	Disc.: Kitt Peak Obs.	MPC; JPL
–	2001 FC213	MBA-M	18.7	760 m	single	4 days	25 Mar 2001	12	Disc.: Kitt Peak Obs.	MPC; JPL
–	2001 FD213	MBA-O	19.5	700 m	single	4 days	25 Mar 2001	12	Disc.: Kitt Peak Obs.	MPC; JPL
5	2001 FE213	MBA-M	19.49	380 m	multiple	2001-2019	29 Sep 2019	109	Disc.: Kitt Peak Obs. Alt.: 2019 SN186	MPC; JPL
0	2001 FF213	MBA-M	18.8	920 m	multiple	2001-2025	29 Jul 2025	49	Disc.: Kitt Peak Obs.	MPC; JPL
–	2001 FH213	MCA	19.2	430 m	single	2 days	23 Mar 2001	10	Disc.: Kitt Peak Obs.	MPC; JPL
–	2001 FK213	MBA-M	17.2	2.0 km	single	2 days	23 Mar 2001	10	Disc.: Kitt Peak Obs.	MPC; JPL
2	2001 FL213	MBA-M	18.48	1.3 km	multiple	2001-2023	24 Apr 2023	29	Disc.: Kitt Peak Obs.	MPC; JPL
0	2001 FN213	MBA-O	17.1	2.1 km	multiple	2001-2021	28 Nov 2021	20	Disc.: Kitt Peak Obs.	MPC; JPL
–	2001 FO213	MBA-I	20.2	270 m	single	10 days	31 Mar 2001	21	Disc.: Kitt Peak Obs.	MPC; JPL
–	2001 FP213	MBA-O	18.4	1.2 km	single	10 days	31 Mar 2001	21	Disc.: Kitt Peak Obs.	MPC; JPL
–	2001 FR213	MBA-O	19.0	880 m	single	4 days	25 Mar 2001	12	Disc.: Kitt Peak Obs.	MPC; JPL
–	2001 FS213	MBA-O	18.3	1.2 km	single	10 days	31 Mar 2001	16	Disc.: Kitt Peak Obs.	MPC; JPL
–	2001 FU213	MBA-M	19.0	880 m	single	10 days	31 Mar 2001	14	Disc.: Kitt Peak Obs.	MPC; JPL
–	2001 FV213	MBA-I	20.5	240 m	single	9 days	30 Mar 2001	17	Disc.: Kitt Peak Obs.	MPC; JPL
–	2001 FW213	MBA-O	18.2	1.3 km	single	10 days	31 Mar 2001	20	Disc.: Kitt Peak Obs.	MPC; JPL
–	2001 FY213	MBA-I	20.2	270 m	single	10 days	31 Mar 2001	19	Disc.: Kitt Peak Obs.	MPC; JPL
–	2001 FZ213	MBA-M	19.2	430 m	single	10 days	31 Mar 2001	21	Disc.: Kitt Peak Obs.	MPC; JPL
–	2001 FA214	MBA-M	19.0	670 m	single	10 days	31 Mar 2001	21	Disc.: Kitt Peak Obs.	MPC; JPL
2	2001 FB214	MBA-O	17.5	1.8 km	multiple	2001–2019	22 Oct 2019	42	Disc.: Kitt Peak Obs.	MPC; JPL
4	2001 FE214	MBA-I	20.25	270 m	multiple	2001-2022	16 Nov 2022	26	Disc.: Kitt Peak Obs.	MPC; JPL
0	2001 FH214	MBA-I	19.5	370 m	multiple	2001–2019	03 Dec 2019	31	Disc.: Kitt Peak Obs.	MPC; JPL
0	2001 FJ214	MBA-O	16.2	3.2 km	multiple	2001-2024	071 May 2024	10	Disc.: Kitt Peak Obs.	MPC; JPL
–	2001 FL214	MBA-O	18.8	970 m	single	10 days	31 Mar 2001	16	Disc.: Kitt Peak Obs.	MPC; JPL
0	2001 FM214	MBA-O	17.51	1.8 km	multiple	2001–2021	26 Nov 2021	38	Disc.: Kitt Peak Obs. Alt.: 2020 PM49	MPC; JPL
0	2001 FN214	MBA-M	18.1	1.3 km	multiple	2001–2020	14 Aug 2020	39	Disc.: Kitt Peak Obs.	MPC; JPL
–	2001 FO214	MBA-O	16.8	2.4 km	single	8 days	29 Mar 2001	10	Disc.: Kitt Peak Obs.	MPC; JPL
–	2001 FQ214	MBA-M	19.4	550 m	single	10 days	31 Mar 2001	20	Disc.: Kitt Peak Obs.	MPC; JPL
2	2001 FT214	MBA-O	17.29	1.9 km	multiple	2001–2021	28 Oct 2021	52	Disc.: Kitt Peak Obs. Alt.: 2021 PR30	MPC; JPL
–	2001 FU214	MBA-M	20.6	230 m	single	10 days	31 Mar 2001	14	Disc.: Kitt Peak Obs.	MPC; JPL
–	2001 FV214	MBA-M	19.0	880 m	single	8 days	29 Mar 2001	9	Disc.: Kitt Peak Obs.	MPC; JPL
–	2001 FW214	MBA-O	19.1	840 m	single	10 days	31 Mar 2001	10	Disc.: Kitt Peak Obs.	MPC; JPL
–	2001 FX214	MBA-M	19.5	370 m	single	10 days	31 Mar 2001	20	Disc.: Kitt Peak Obs.	MPC; JPL
6	2001 FY214	MBA-M	19.3	580 m	multiple	2001–2014	25 Apr 2014	18	Disc.: Kitt Peak Obs.	MPC; JPL
2	2001 FZ214	MBA-I	19.8	330 m	multiple	2001-2022	24 Feb 2022	17	Disc.: Kitt Peak Obs.	MPC; JPL
0	2001 FB215	MBA-I	19.45	410 m	multiple	2001-2024	27 Sep 2024	39	Disc.: Kitt Peak Obs.	MPC; JPL
–	2001 FC215	MBA-M	19.2	430 m	single	10 days	31 Mar 2001	14	Disc.: Kitt Peak Obs.	MPC; JPL
0	2001 FE215	MBA-M	18.71	760 m	multiple	2001-2024	01 Oct 2024	62	Disc.: Kitt Peak Obs.	MPC; JPL
2	2001 FG215	MBA-O	17.68	1.7 km	multiple	2001-2017	25 Feb 2017	28	Disc.: Kitt Peak Obs.	MPC; JPL
–	2001 FJ215	MBA-I	22.4	98 m	single	10 days	31 Mar 2001	9	Disc.: Kitt Peak Obs.	MPC; JPL
0	2001 FK215	MBA-M	17.7	1.2 km	multiple	2001–2020	16 Aug 2020	38	Disc.: Kitt Peak Obs.	MPC; JPL
–	2001 FL215	MBA-I	20.1	280 m	single	10 days	31 Mar 2001	24	Disc.: Kitt Peak Obs.	MPC; JPL
0	2001 FM215	MBA-I	19.5	390 m	multiple	2001-2022	21 May 2022	44	Disc.: Kitt Peak Obs.	MPC; JPL
–	2001 FO215	MBA-O	18.2	1.3 km	single	10 days	31 Mar 2001	10	Disc.: Kitt Peak Obs.	MPC; JPL
5	2001 FQ215	MBA-O	19.4	730 m	multiple	2001–2019	02 Nov 2019	19	Disc.: Kitt Peak Obs.	MPC; JPL
–	2001 FS215	MBA-I	20.4	250 m	single	9 days	30 Mar 2001	16	Disc.: Kitt Peak Obs.	MPC; JPL
0	2001 FT215	MBA-O	17.8	1.5 km	multiple	2001-2023	11 Oct 2023	20	Disc.: Kitt Peak Obs.	MPC; JPL
5	2001 FU215	MBA-M	18.51	14 km	multiple	2001-2015	25 May 2015	29	Disc.: Kitt Peak Obs. Alt.: 2015 KZ276	MPC; JPL
5	2001 FV215	MBA-I	19.93	320 m	multiple	2001-2017	28 Sep 2017	31	Disc.: Kitt Peak Obs.	MPC; JPL
–	2001 FX215	MBA-O	18.2	1.3 km	single	10 days	31 Mar 2001	20	Disc.: Kitt Peak Obs.	MPC; JPL
–	2001 FY215	MBA-O	18.9	920 m	single	10 days	31 Mar 2001	16	Disc.: Kitt Peak Obs.	MPC; JPL
1	2001 FZ215	MBA-M	18.7	760 m	multiple	2001–2019	30 Aug 2019	42	Disc.: Kitt Peak Obs.	MPC; JPL
–	2001 FA216	MBA-O	19.4	730 m	single	10 days	31 Mar 2001	16	Disc.: Kitt Peak Obs.	MPC; JPL
–	2001 FC216	MBA-O	17.8	1.5 km	single	10 days	31 Mar 2001	17	Disc.: Kitt Peak Obs.	MPC; JPL
–	2001 FD216	MBA-M	19.1	450 m	single	2 days	23 Mar 2001	10	Disc.: Kitt Peak Obs.	MPC; JPL
0	2001 FE216	MBA-M	18.16	960 m	multiple	2001-2021	26 Nov 2021	29	Disc.: Kitt Peak Obs.	MPC; JPL
3	2001 FF216	MCA	19.8	340 m	multiple	2001-2019	03 Apr 2019	33	Disc.: Kitt Peak Obs.	MPC; JPL
–	2001 FH216	MBA-M	18.5	840 m	single	10 days	31 Mar 2001	16	Disc.: Kitt Peak Obs.	MPC; JPL
5	2001 FJ216	MBA-O	18.3	1.2 km	multiple	2001–2003	30 Sep 2003	22	Disc.: Kitt Peak Obs. Alt.: 2003 SG267	MPC; JPL
–	2001 FK216	MBA-M	19.8	610 m	single	2 days	23 Mar 2001	10	Disc.: Kitt Peak Obs.	MPC; JPL
2	2001 FL216	MBA-O	17.6	1.7 km	multiple	2001–2017	17 Mar 2017	28	Disc.: Kitt Peak Obs.	MPC; JPL
–	2001 FM216	MBA-I	20.1	280 m	single	10 days	31 Mar 2001	17	Disc.: Kitt Peak Obs.	MPC; JPL
4	2001 FN216	MBA-I	19.94	320 m	multiple	2001-2012	29 Feb 2012	31	Disc.: Kitt Peak Obs.	MPC; JPL
4	2001 FO216	MBA-O	18.74	840 m	multiple	2001-2025	20 Nov 2025	29	Disc.: Kitt Peak Obs.	MPC; JPL
–	2001 FQ216	MBA-I	20.8	210 m	single	2 days	23 Mar 2001	10	Disc.: Kitt Peak Obs.	MPC; JPL
–	2001 FR216	MBA-O	19.2	800 m	single	10 days	31 Mar 2001	20	Disc.: Kitt Peak Obs.	MPC; JPL
–	2001 FS216	MBA-I	20.0	300 m	single	10 days	31 Mar 2001	13	Disc.: Kitt Peak Obs.	MPC; JPL
0	2001 FU216	MBA-I	18.85	520 m	multiple	2001–2023	27 Aug 2023	27	Disc.: Kitt Peak Obs.	MPC; JPL
0	2001 FY216	MBA-O	17.36	2.0 km	multiple	2001–2023	16 Mar 2023	55	Disc.: Kitt Peak Obs.	MPC; JPL
–	2001 FZ216	MBA-O	20.4	460 m	single	9 days	30 Mar 2001	18	Disc.: Kitt Peak Obs.	MPC; JPL

back to top
