= List of unnumbered minor planets: 2001 G–O =

This is a partial list of unnumbered minor planets for principal provisional designations assigned between 1 April and 31 July 2001. As of May 2026, a total of 150 bodies remain unnumbered for this period. Objects for this year are listed on the following pages: A–E · F_{i} · F_{ii} · G–O · P–R · S · T · U · V–W and X–Y. Also see previous and next year.

Near-Earth obj.	MBA (inner)	MBA (outer)	Centaur
Mars-crosser	MBA (middle)	Jupiter trojan	Trans-Neptunian obj.
Unclassified

== G ==
U	Designation	Class	Physical		Observations				Description and notes	Ref
U	Designation	Class	H	D	Opp.	Arc	Last	Used	Description and notes	Ref
8	2001 GL2	APO	20.6	270 m	single	13 days	16 Apr 2001	18	Disc.: LONEOS; Potentially hazardous object	MPC; JPL
0	2001 GM2	APO	20.44	270 m	multiple	2001–2014	18 May 2014	129	Disc.: LINEAR	MPC; JPL
7	2001 GO2	APO	24.3	49 m	single	5 days	17 Apr 2001	23	Disc.: LINEAR	MPC; JPL
2	2001 GP2	APO	26.4	19 m	multiple	2001–2020	16 Nov 2020	58	Disc.: Spacewatch; Alt.: 2020 UJ7	MPC; JPL
1	2001 GR2	APO	21.6	170 m	multiple	2001–2011	20 Oct 2011	77	Disc.: LINEAR; Potentially hazardous object	MPC; JPL
1	2001 GS2	AMO	20.5	280 m	multiple	2001–2020	17 May 2020	280	Disc.: AMOS	MPC; JPL
0	2001 GT2	APO	19.8	390 m	multiple	2001–2012	13 May 2012	80	Disc.: LONEOS; Potentially hazardous object	MPC; JPL
2	2001 GZ11	MBA-O	17.5	1.8 km	multiple	2001–2017	24 Mar 2017	22	Disc.: Spacewatch	MPC; JPL
0	2001 GC12	MBA-I	18.4	620 m	multiple	2001–2020	13 Sep 2020	47	Disc.: Spacewatch	MPC; JPL

back to top

== H ==
U	Designation	Class	Physical		Observations				Description and notes	Ref
U	Designation	Class	H	D	Opp.	Arc	Last	Used	Description and notes	Ref
1	2001 HW7	AMO	20.3	310 m	multiple	2001–2017	11 Oct 2017	75	Disc.: Spacewatch	MPC; JPL
3	2001 HX7	AMO	20.6	270 m	multiple	2001–2018	09 May 2018	61	Disc.: LINEAR	MPC; JPL
–	2001 HV15	MCA	18.5	1.1 km	single	53 days	15 May 2001	28	Disc.: AMOS	MPC; JPL
1	2001 HU16	MCA	19.39	400 m	multiple	2001-2022	25 Jul 2022	38	Disc.: LONEOS	MPC; JPL
0	2001 HB17	MBA-M	18.2	960 m	multiple	2001–2020	16 Sep 2020	41	Disc.: Spacewatch; Alt.: 2005 CB10	MPC; JPL
2	2001 HR17	MBA-M	18.05	750 m	multiple	2001-2022	23 May 2022	25	Disc.: Spacewatch	MPC; JPL
1	2001 HU19	MBA-O	17.45	1.9 km	multiple	2001-2024	10 Sep 2024	33	Disc.: LPL/Spacewatch II	MPC; JPL
1	2001 HH23	HUN	19.21	430 m	multiple	2001–2021	09 Apr 2021	32	Disc.: Spacewatch; Alt.: 2016 GL221	MPC; JPL
2	2001 HT24	HUN	19.2	430 m	multiple	2001–2020	22 Feb 2020	44	Disc.: Spacewatch; Alt.: 2013 UG4	MPC; JPL
0	2001 HT25	MBA-I	18.6	570 m	multiple	2001–2019	20 Oct 2019	47	Disc.: Spacewatch	MPC; JPL
1	2001 HJ30	MBA-O	17.2	2.0 km	multiple	2001–2017	16 Jul 2017	152	Disc.: LONEOS	MPC; JPL
0	2001 HL30	MCA	17.05	1.6 km	multiple	2001–2022	10 Jan 2022	97	Disc.: AMOS	MPC; JPL
7	2001 HJ31	APO	23.8	62 m	single	4 days	30 Apr 2001	25	Disc.: LONEOS	MPC; JPL
2	2001 HK31	AMO	21.0	220 m	single	59 days	19 Jun 2001	85	Disc.: LONEOS	MPC; JPL
0	2001 HL31	APO	20.27	310 m	multiple	2001-2025	05 Jan 2025	105	Disc.: LINEAR	MPC; JPL
3	2001 HA59	TNO	6.5	167 km	multiple	2001–2016	29 May 2016	13	Disc.: La Silla Obs. LoUTNOs, cubewano (cold)	MPC; JPL
0	2001 HV67	MBA-I	18.5	590 m	multiple	1998–2020	25 May 2020	52	Disc.: Astrovirtel	MPC; JPL
0	2001 HX69	MBA-I	18.8	520 m	multiple	2001–2020	10 Oct 2020	50	Disc.: SDSS	MPC; JPL
0	2001 HS70	MBA-O	17.0	2.2 km	multiple	2001–2019	30 Sep 2019	41	Disc.: LPL/Spacewatch II	MPC; JPL
0	2001 HC71	MBA-M	18.0	1.1 km	multiple	2001–2021	18 Jan 2021	45	Disc.: Astrovirtel	MPC; JPL
0	2001 HE71	MBA-O	17.0	2.2 km	multiple	2001–2019	24 Aug 2019	30	Disc.: LPL/Spacewatch II	MPC; JPL
0	2001 HK71	MBA-I	18.4	620 m	multiple	2001–2020	11 Aug 2020	28	Disc.: LPL/Spacewatch II; Added on 5 November 2021	MPC; JPL

back to top

== J ==
U	Designation	Class	Physical		Observations				Description and notes	Ref
U	Designation	Class	H	D	Opp.	Arc	Last	Used	Description and notes	Ref
0	2001 JV1	APO	21.50	180 m	multiple	2001–2021	31 Oct 2021	203	Disc.: NEAT; Potentially hazardous object	MPC; JPL
2	2001 JW1	AMO	20.3	310 m	multiple	2001–2019	24 Dec 2019	132	Disc.: AMOS	MPC; JPL
0	2001 JK11	MBA-I	18.6	570 m	multiple	2001–2019	05 Jun 2019	50	Disc.: Spacewatch	MPC; JPL
4	2001 JO11	MBA-I	19.2	430 m	multiple	2001–2019	05 Jun 2019	16	Disc.: Spacewatch	MPC; JPL

back to top

== K ==
U	Designation	Class	Physical		Observations				Description and notes	Ref
U	Designation	Class	H	D	Opp.	Arc	Last	Used	Description and notes	Ref
1	2001 KO8	MBA-I	17.6	900 m	multiple	2001–2020	11 Nov 2020	43	Disc.: LINEAR	MPC; JPL
7	2001 KW18	AMO	26.0	22 m	single	5 days	23 May 2001	24	Disc.: LONEOS	MPC; JPL
0	2001 KY18	AMO	18.26	790 m	multiple	2001–2022	26 Jan 2022	120	Disc.: LINEAR; Added on 24 December 2021; NEO larger than 1 kilometer	MPC; JPL
0	2001 KM20	APO	23.91	59 m	multiple	2001–2019	04 Nov 2019	96	Disc.: LINEAR	MPC; JPL
1	2001 KO41	AMO	20.74	240 m	multiple	2001-2024	11 Feb 2024	76	Disc.: AMOS	MPC; JPL
1	2001 KF54	APO	20.1	340 m	multiple	2001–2019	19 Dec 2019	71	Disc.: Spacewatch; Potentially hazardous object	MPC; JPL
1	2001 KD55	AMO	20.6	270 m	multiple	2001–2007	12 Mar 2007	51	Disc.: LINEAR	MPC; JPL
6	2001 KU66	APO	24.1	54 m	single	4 days	03 Jun 2001	61	Disc.: Spacewatch; AMO at MPC	MPC; JPL
8	2001 KD68	AMO	22.7	100 m	single	19 days	19 Jun 2001	20	Disc.: NEAT	MPC; JPL
3	2001 KF76	TNO	7.2	121 km	multiple	2001–2007	19 May 2007	17	Disc.: Cerro Tololo; LoUTNOs, cubewano (cold)	MPC; JPL
2	2001 KG76	TNO	6.2	208 km	multiple	2001–2008	09 May 2008	39	Disc.: Cerro Tololo; LoUTNOs, res · 4:9, BR-mag: 1.92	MPC; JPL
3	2001 KH76	TNO	6.8	145 km	multiple	2001–2006	20 Apr 2006	19	Disc.: Cerro Tololo; LoUTNOs, cubewano (cold)	MPC; JPL
4	2001 KL76	TNO	6.6	173 km	multiple	2001–2008	30 May 2008	22	Disc.: Cerro Tololo; LoUTNOs, res · 5:9	MPC; JPL
E	2001 KM76	TNO	7.1	130 km	single	19 days	10 Jun 2001	4	Disc.: Cerro Tololo; LoUTNOs, cubewano?	MPC; JPL
3	2001 KQ76	TNO	6.3	282 km	multiple	2001–2020	15 May 2020	12	Disc.: Cerro Tololo; LoUTNOs, cubewano (hot)	MPC; JPL
E	2001 KS76	TNO	7.5	109 km	single	17 days	10 Jun 2001	4	Disc.: Cerro Tololo; LoUTNOs, cubewano?	MPC; JPL
2	2001 KW76	TNO	7.6	126 km	multiple	2001–2008	05 May 2008	29	Disc.: Cerro Tololo; LoUTNOs, other TNO	MPC; JPL
5	2001 KY76	TNO	6.17	285 km	multiple	2001–2022	04 Jul 2022	35	Disc.: Cerro Tololo; LoUTNOs, plutino, BR-mag: 1.84	MPC; JPL
E	2001 KZ76	TNO	7.8	104 km	single	17 days	10 Jun 2001	4	Disc.: Cerro Tololo; LoUTNOs, SDO	MPC; JPL
4	2001 KA77	TNO	5.0	634 km	multiple	2001–2006	05 Feb 2006	33	Disc.: Cerro Tololo; LoUTNOs, cubewano (hot), albedo: 0.025; BR-mag: 1.82; taxonomy: RR	MPC; JPL
3	2001 KE77	TNO	7.2	151 km	multiple	2001–2008	04 May 2008	12	Disc.: Cerro Tololo; LoUTNOs, other TNO	MPC; JPL
4	2001 KG77	TNO	8.1	91 km	multiple	2001–2003	01 May 2003	15	Disc.: Cerro Tololo; LoUTNOs, SDO, BR-mag: 1.24	MPC; JPL
2	2001 KO77	TNO	7.9	109 km	multiple	2001–2016	29 May 2016	27	Disc.: Cerro Tololo; LoUTNOs, other TNO	MPC; JPL
1	2001 KF79	MBA-M	18.0	1.4 km	multiple	2001–2020	15 Oct 2020	34	Disc.: Cerro Tololo; Added on 17 January 2021	MPC; JPL
0	2001 KY80	MBA-M	18.15	990 m	multiple	2001–2022	10 Jan 2022	53	Disc.: SDSS	MPC; JPL
2	2001 KN81	MBA-I	18.9	490 m	multiple	2001–2018	15 Dec 2018	55	Disc.: Cerro Tololo	MPC; JPL
0	2001 KX81	MBA-I	18.73	530 m	multiple	2001–2021	08 May 2021	69	Disc.: Cerro Tololo	MPC; JPL
0	2001 KY82	MBA-I	19.1	450 m	multiple	2001–2020	29 Apr 2020	49	Disc.: Cerro Tololo	MPC; JPL
2	2001 KE83	MBA-M	18.5	590 m	multiple	2001–2018	13 Aug 2018	32	Disc.: Cerro Tololo	MPC; JPL
0	2001 KN83	MBA-O	17.1	2.1 km	multiple	2001–2020	08 Dec 2020	41	Disc.: Cerro Tololo	MPC; JPL
0	2001 KO83	MBA-I	18.5	590 m	multiple	2001–2020	18 Oct 2020	54	Disc.: Cerro Tololo	MPC; JPL
1	2001 KC85	MBA-M	18.5	840 m	multiple	2001–2019	25 Nov 2019	46	Disc.: Cerro Tololo	MPC; JPL
0	2001 KX85	MBA-I	19.48	380 m	multiple	2001–2021	04 Oct 2021	53	Disc.: Cerro Tololo	id="2001 KB86" bgcolor=#E9E9E9
1	2001 KB86	MBA-M	18.3	650 m	multiple	2001–2020	28 Jan 2020	60	Disc.: Cerro Tololo	MPC; JPL
0	2001 KK86	MBA-I	18.7	540 m	multiple	2001–2020	22 Oct 2020	34	Disc.: Cerro Tololo	MPC; JPL
0	2001 KM86	MBA-M	18.0	1.1 km	multiple	2001–2019	29 Oct 2019	35	Disc.: Cerro Tololo	MPC; JPL
3	2001 KO86	MBA-I	19.1	450 m	multiple	2001–2019	05 Oct 2019	35	Disc.: Cerro Tololo	MPC; JPL
0	2001 KP86	MBA-M	18.1	1.0 km	multiple	2001–2019	31 Oct 2019	47	Disc.: Cerro Tololo	MPC; JPL
1	2001 KW86	MBA-O	17.31	2.0 km	multiple	2001–2023	12 Jun 2023	57	Disc.: SDSS	MPC; JPL
0	2001 KX86	MBA-O	17.2	2.0 km	multiple	2001–2019	19 Sep 2019	26	Disc.: Cerro Tololo	MPC; JPL
0	2001 KY86	MBA-I	19.0	470 m	multiple	2001–2019	19 Dec 2019	39	Disc.: Cerro Tololo	MPC; JPL
1	2001 KZ86	MBA-I	18.5	590 m	multiple	2001–2018	11 Jul 2018	28	Disc.: Cerro Tololo	MPC; JPL
0	2001 KC87	MBA-I	19.24	420 m	multiple	2001–2021	15 May 2021	57	Disc.: Cerro Tololo	MPC; JPL
0	2001 KU87	MBA-M	17.6	1.3 km	multiple	2001–2019	24 Oct 2019	41	Disc.: Spacewatch	MPC; JPL
0	2001 KA88	MBA-O	17.7	1.6 km	multiple	2001–2019	06 Sep 2019	21	Disc.: Cerro Tololo	MPC; JPL
0	2001 KE88	MBA-M	17.8	1.2 km	multiple	2001–2019	29 Sep 2019	49	Disc.: Cerro Tololo	MPC; JPL
0	2001 KG88	MBA-O	17.6	1.7 km	multiple	2001–2021	18 Jan 2021	45	Disc.: Cerro Tololo	MPC; JPL
0	2001 KK88	MBA-M	18.3	920 m	multiple	2001–2019	04 Sep 2019	34	Disc.: SDSS	MPC; JPL
0	2001 KL88	MBA-M	18.5	590 m	multiple	2001–2018	08 Aug 2018	30	Disc.: Cerro Tololo	MPC; JPL
1	2001 KM88	MBA-I	19.9	310 m	multiple	2001–2020	20 Jul 2020	32	Disc.: Cerro Tololo	MPC; JPL
0	2001 KN88	MBA-M	17.8	1.2 km	multiple	2001–2019	27 Oct 2019	27	Disc.: Cerro Tololo	MPC; JPL
0	2001 KP88	MBA-O	17.2	2.0 km	multiple	2001–2020	23 Dec 2020	31	Disc.: Cerro Tololo	MPC; JPL
0	2001 KY88	MBA-I	18.5	590 m	multiple	2001–2020	15 Oct 2020	55	Disc.: Spacewatch	MPC; JPL
0	2001 KA89	MBA-I	18.0	750 m	multiple	2001–2019	24 Aug 2019	46	Disc.: Cerro Tololo	MPC; JPL
0	2001 KB89	MBA-O	17.5	1.8 km	multiple	2001–2020	22 Jan 2020	36	Disc.: Cerro Tololo	MPC; JPL
1	2001 KD89	MBA-I	19.0	470 m	multiple	2001–2019	25 Sep 2019	37	Disc.: Cerro Tololo	MPC; JPL
0	2001 KE89	MBA-I	18.70	540 m	multiple	2001–2021	07 Nov 2021	35	Disc.: Cerro Tololo	MPC; JPL
1	2001 KF89	MBA-I	18.8	520 m	multiple	2001–2016	19 Nov 2016	47	Disc.: Cerro Tololo	MPC; JPL
3	2001 KJ89	MBA-I	19.4	390 m	multiple	2001–2015	18 Sep 2015	34	Disc.: Cerro Tololo; Added on 13 September 2020	MPC; JPL
0	2001 KK89	MBA-O	17.35	1.9 km	multiple	2001–2021	11 Jun 2021	74	Disc.: Cerro Tololo Obs. Added on 19 October 2020	MPC; JPL

back to top

== L ==
U	Designation	Class	Physical		Observations				Description and notes	Ref
U	Designation	Class	H	D	Opp.	Arc	Last	Used	Description and notes	Ref
0	2001 LD	APO	20.68	260 m	multiple	2001–2023	10 Jun 2023	180	Disc.: LINEAR; Potentially hazardous object	MPC; JPL
0	2001 LD6	AMO	19.2	510 m	multiple	2001–2010	05 May 2010	97	Disc.: LINEAR	MPC; JPL
0	2001 LF20	MBA-M	18.33	640 m	multiple	2001–2021	07 Feb 2021	43	Disc.: SDSS	MPC; JPL
0	2001 LQ20	HUN	18.4	620 m	multiple	2001–2020	11 Nov 2020	38	Disc.: SDSS	MPC; JPL
0	2001 LR20	MBA-M	18.34	900 m	multiple	2001–2019	25 Sep 2019	164	Disc.: Spacewatch	MPC; JPL

back to top

== M ==
U	Designation	Class	Physical		Observations				Description and notes	Ref
U	Designation	Class	H	D	Opp.	Arc	Last	Used	Description and notes	Ref
5	2001 MD1	AMO	21.4	190 m	single	68 days	23 Aug 2001	106	Disc.: LINEAR	MPC; JPL
0	2001 MS3	APO	23.91	56 m	multiple	2001-2026	09 Apr 2026	36	Disc.: NEAT	MPC; JPL
0	2001 MY7	AMO	21.8	160 m	multiple	2001–2021	16 Jun 2021	83	Disc.: LINEAR	MPC; JPL
0	2001 MT31	MBA-O	16.4	2.9 km	multiple	2001–2020	17 Oct 2020	96	Disc.: SDSS	MPC; JPL
1	2001 MH32	MBA-M	18.32	1.2 km	multiple	2001–2019	06 Jul 2019	41	Disc.: Spacewatch	MPC; JPL

back to top

== N ==
U	Designation	Class	Physical		Observations				Description and notes	Ref
U	Designation	Class	H	D	Opp.	Arc	Last	Used	Description and notes	Ref
6	2001 NY1	AMO	23.2	81 m	single	71 days	19 Sep 2001	24	Disc.: NEAT	MPC; JPL
1	2001 NJ6	AMO	20.7	260 m	multiple	2001–2017	26 Sep 2017	80	Disc.: NEAT	MPC; JPL
1	2001 ND13	APO	21.63	180 m	multiple	2001-2025	30 Jun 2025	36	Disc.: NEAT	MPC; JPL
1	2001 NE13	AMO	20.1	340 m	multiple	1998–2007	14 Mar 2007	47	Disc.: NEAT	MPC; JPL
1	2001 NN13	MBA-M	17.3	1.5 km	multiple	2001–2018	12 Aug 2018	63	Disc.: NEAT	MPC; JPL
0	2001 NH23	MBA-I	18.5	590 m	multiple	2001–2018	11 Jul 2018	33	Disc.: NEAT	MPC; JPL
0	2001 NJ23	MBA-O	16.3	3.1 km	multiple	2001–2020	02 Jan 2020	26	Disc.: NEAT; Added on 19 October 2020	MPC; JPL

back to top

== O ==
U	Designation	Class	Physical		Observations				Description and notes	Ref
U	Designation	Class	H	D	Opp.	Arc	Last	Used	Description and notes	Ref
2	2001 OT	ATE	21.7	160 m	multiple	2001–2019	27 Aug 2019	104	Disc.: AMOS	MPC; JPL
0	2001 OD3	AMO	19.46	460 m	multiple	2001–2018	09 Nov 2018	69	Disc.: AMOS	MPC; JPL
1	2001 OE3	AMO	20.3	310 m	multiple	2001–2003	18 Jul 2003	223	Disc.: NEAT	MPC; JPL
1	2001 OD13	MCA	19.3	410 m	multiple	2001–2020	11 Nov 2020	89	Disc.: NEAT	MPC; JPL
1	2001 OE13	MCA	19.54	370 m	multiple	2001–2024	26 Oct 2024	80	Disc.: NEAT	MPC; JPL
0	2001 OV13	AMO	23.1	85 m	multiple	2001–2015	17 Sep 2015	58	Disc.: LONEOS; Alt.: 2015 NH13	MPC; JPL
1	2001 OX13	AMO	19.0	560 m	multiple	2001–2012	01 Oct 2012	80	Disc.: NEAT	MPC; JPL
1	2001 OO16	MBA-O	17.83	1.5 km	multiple	2001–2017	22 Oct 2017	55	Disc.: NEAT	MPC; JPL
–	2001 OK17	MBA-O	18.8	970 m	single	23 days	09 Aug 2001	53	Disc.: AMOS; MCA at MPC	MPC; JPL
7	2001 OF25	AMO	21.4	190 m	single	58 days	18 Sep 2001	32	Disc.: LONEOS	MPC; JPL
0	2001 OH32	MCA	19.0	590 m	multiple	2001-2024	04 Sep 2024	44	Disc.: Mount John; Alt.: 2014 JH151	MPC; JPL
0	2001 OJ34	MBA-I	18.04	730 m	multiple	2001–2020	11 Oct 2020	67	Disc.: NEAT; Alt.: 2005 SJ210	MPC; JPL
8	2001 OC36	APO	22.9	93 m	single	7 days	01 Aug 2001	24	Disc.: AMOS	MPC; JPL
1	2001 OE36	MBA-M	17.7	860 m	multiple	2001–2021	05 Jun 2021	204	Disc.: NEAT	MPC; JPL
1	2001 OV44	MCA	17.3	1.5 km	multiple	2001–2020	26 Jan 2020	161	Disc.: LONEOS	MPC; JPL
1	2001 OB74	MCA	17.5	1.8 km	multiple	2001–2017	16 Nov 2017	128	Disc.: NEAT	MPC; JPL
0	2001 OC74	MCA	19.39	390 m	multiple	2001–2021	03 May 2021	53	Disc.: NEAT	MPC; JPL
E	2001 OJ108	TNO	7.8	95 km	single	1 day	25 Jul 2001	4	Disc.: Mauna Kea Obs. LoUTNOs, cubewano?	MPC; JPL
4	2001 OK108	TNO	7.45	108 km	multiple	1999–2021	12 Sep 2021	22	Disc.: Mauna Kea Obs. LoUTNOs, cubewano (cold)	MPC; JPL
8	2001 OL108	TNO	8.07	72 km	multiple	2001-2025	24 Jul 2025	8	Disc.: Mauna Kea Obs. LoUTNOs, cubewano?	MPC; JPL
E	2001 OM108	TNO	8.0	86 km	single	112 days	14 Nov 2001	6	Disc.: Mauna Kea Obs. LoUTNOs, cubewano?	MPC; JPL
E	2001 ON108	TNO	7.6	104 km	single	56 days	19 Sep 2001	6	Disc.: Mauna Kea Obs. LoUTNOs, cubewano?	MPC; JPL
6	2001 OO108	TNO	7.9	99 km	multiple	2001–2015	28 May 2015	9	Disc.: Mauna Kea Obs. LoUTNOs, SDO	MPC; JPL
3	2001 OQ108	TNO	6.5	167 km	multiple	2001–2017	26 May 2017	26	Disc.: Cerro Tololo; LoUTNOs, cubewano (cold); Alt.: 2001 KR76	MPC; JPL
E	2001 OR108	TNO	7.9	90 km	single	1 day	25 Jul 2001	4	Disc.: Mauna Kea Obs. LoUTNOs, cubewano?	MPC; JPL
E	2001 OS108	TNO	6.8	150 km	single	17 days	11 Aug 2001	5	Disc.: Mauna Kea Obs. LoUTNOs, cubewano?	MPC; JPL
E	2001 OT108	TNO	9.2	55 km	single	1 day	26 Jul 2001	4	Disc.: Mauna Kea Obs. LoUTNOs, SDO	MPC; JPL
E	2001 OU108	TNO	6.5	209 km	single	16 days	11 Aug 2001	6	Disc.: Mauna Kea Obs. LoUTNOs, other TNO	MPC; JPL
E	2001 OY108	TNO	7.4	114 km	single	1 day	25 Jul 2001	3	Disc.: Mauna Kea Obs. LoUTNOs, cubewano?	MPC; JPL
3	2001 OZ108	TNO	8.3	73 km	multiple	1999–2006	29 Jul 2006	18	Disc.: Mauna Kea Obs. LoUTNOs, cubewano (cold)	MPC; JPL
0	2001 OA109	MBA-O	16.2	3.2 km	multiple	2001–2019	19 Dec 2019	42	Disc.: Mauna Kea Obs. Added on 22 July 2020; Alt.: 2017 FQ172	MPC; JPL
3	2001 OG109	TNO	8.1	80 km	multiple	1999–2014	03 Sep 2014	20	Disc.: Mauna Kea Obs. LoUTNOs, cubewano (cold)	MPC; JPL
3	2001 OM109	TNO	7.9	99 km	multiple	2001–2006	08 Jun 2006	20	Disc.: Mauna Kea Obs. LoUTNOs, SDO	MPC; JPL
2	2001 OE112	MBA-M	18.02	1.4 km	multiple	2001–2024	01 Sep 2024	19	Disc.: La Palma Obs.	MPC; JPL
1	2001 OS114	MBA-M	17.8	1.2 km	multiple	2001–2014	13 Oct 2014	46	Disc.: NEAT; Alt.: 2010 NY139	MPC; JPL
1	2001 OE115	MBA-M	17.8	820 m	multiple	2001–2019	04 Feb 2019	21	Disc.: NEAT	MPC; JPL

back to top
