= List of unnumbered minor planets: 2001 T =

This is a partial list of unnumbered minor planets for principal provisional designations assigned during 1–15 October 2001. As of March 2026, a total of 115 bodies remain unnumbered for this period. Objects for this year are listed on the following pages: A–E · F_{i} · F_{ii} · G–O · P–R · S · T · U · V–W and X–Y. Also see previous and next year.

Near-Earth obj.	MBA (inner)	MBA (outer)	Centaur
Mars-crosser	MBA (middle)	Jupiter trojan	Trans-Neptunian obj.
Unclassified

== T ==
U	Designation	Class	Physical		Observations				Description and notes	Ref	
U	Designation	Class	H	D	Opp.	Arc	Last	Used	Description and notes	Ref	
6	2001 TB	APO	24.4	47 m	single	3 days	08 Oct 2001	35	Disc.: LINEAR	MPC; JPL	
3	2001 TC	AMO	20.7	260 m	multiple	2001–2015	14 Nov 2015	76	Disc.: NEAT	MPC; JPL	
7	2001 TD	ATE	25.1	34 m	single	8 days	16 Oct 2001	30	Disc.: LINEAR	MPC; JPL	
2	2001 TN	MBA-I	18.3	650 m	multiple	2001–2020	17 Oct 2020	80	Disc.: NEAT	MPC; JPL	
2	2001 TY1	APO	25.0	36 m	single	40 days	15 Nov 2001	40	Disc.: LINEAR	MPC; JPL	
2	2001 TA2	APO	22.0	140 m	multiple	2001–2013	30 Mar 2013	117	Disc.: LINEAR; Potentially hazardous object Alt.: 2013 FH	MPC; JPL	
6	2001 TB2	AMO	21.5	180 m	single	38 days	18 Nov 2001	68	Disc.: LINEAR	MPC; JPL	
1	2001 TE3	MCA	19.69	340 m	multiple	2001–2019	03 Apr 2019	73	Disc.: NEAT	MPC; JPL	
0	2001 TK7	MBA-M	17.7	1.2 km	multiple	2001–2018	16 Nov 2018	52	Disc.: NEAT; Alt.: 2014 RQ18	MPC; JPL	
0	2001 TM7	MCA	18.9	700 m	multiple	2001–2018	05 Oct 2018	55	Disc.: NEAT	MPC; JPL	
0	2001 TO13	MCA	18.25	670 m	multiple	2001–2021	16 Jun 2021	76	Disc.: LINEAR	MPC; JPL	
2	2001 TF17	MCA	18.9	490 m	multiple	2001–2005	27 Oct 2005	56	Disc.: LINEAR	MPC; JPL	
0	2001 TY44	AMO	20.3	310 m	multiple	2001–2019	28 Aug 2019	149	Disc.: LINEAR	MPC; JPL	
0	2001 TB45	AMO	18.6	680 m	multiple	2001–2023	28 Mar 2023	93	Disc.: LINEAR	MPC; JPL	
0	2001 TC45	APO	19.53	440 m	multiple	2001–2021	13 Sep 2021	143	Disc.: LINEAR; Potentially hazardous object	MPC; JPL	
9	2001 TE45	APO	22.9	93 m	single	6 days	21 Oct 2001	26	Disc.: AMOS	MPC; JPL	
1	2001 TN51	MBA-M	17.7	860 m	multiple	2001–2019	08 Jan 2019	79	Disc.: LINEAR; Alt.: 2005 SC19	MPC; JPL	
1	2001 TM55	MBA-M	17.4	1.4 km	multiple	2001–2015	17 Jan 2015	34	Disc.: LINEAR	MPC; JPL	
0	2001 TY58	MBA-M	18.1	1.0 km	multiple	2001–2018	17 Nov 2018	71	Disc.: LINEAR	MPC; JPL	
0	2001 TB62	MBA-I	18.5	590 m	multiple	2001–2015	09 Oct 2015	52	Disc.: LINEAR	MPC; JPL	
0	2001 TL87	MBA-M	18.2	680 m	multiple	2001–2019	08 Jan 2019	44	Disc.: LINEAR	MPC; JPL	
0	2001 TR103	MCA	18.6	570 m	multiple	2001–2019	30 Dec 2019	107	Disc.: NEAT; Alt.: 2008 SA296	MPC; JPL	
1	2001 TS103	MBA-O	18.0	1.4 km	multiple	2001–2017	07 Nov 2017	30	Disc.: NEAT; Alt.: 2012 TN140	MPC; JPL	
–	2001 TU128	MBA-O	17.8	1.5 km	single	4 days	15 Oct 2001	9	Disc.: Spacewatch	MPC; JPL	
0	2001 TS144	MBA-M	17.6	1.3 km	multiple	2001–2020	02 Feb 2020	86	Disc.: NEAT; Alt.: 2014 SA316	MPC; JPL	
4	2001 TB145	MBA-I	18.3	650 m	multiple	2001–2020	21 May 2020	19	Disc.: NEAT	MPC; JPL	
0	2001 TC145	MBA-M	18.3	920 m	multiple	2001–2018	10 Nov 2018	88	Disc.: NEAT; Alt.: 2018 RJ26	MPC; JPL	
0	2001 TQ149	MBA-I	17.7	860 m	multiple	1994–2020	22 Feb 2020	200	Disc.: La Silla Obs. Alt.: 1994 RR28, 2011 QQ26	MPC; JPL	
0	2001 TR156	MBA-O	17.8	1.5 km	multiple	2001–2019	05 Feb 2019	26	Disc.: LPL/Spacewatch II	MPC; JPL	
0	2001 TA157	MBA-I	18.7	540 m	multiple	2001–2019	03 Oct 2019	68	Disc.: LPL/Spacewatch II; Alt.: 2012 VV79	MPC; JPL	
0	2001 TV161	MBA-M	18.56	650 m	multiple	1997-2022	29 Nov 2022	62	Disc.: NEAT; Alt.: 2022 SP181	MPC; JPL	
1	2001 TD171	MBA-M	18.3	1.2 km	multiple	2001–2019	01 Jun 2019	93	Disc.: AMOS	MPC; JPL	
0	2001 TV181	MCA	18.4	880 m	multiple	2001–2019	07 Jan 2019	33	Disc.: LINEAR	MPC; JPL	
2	2001 TD207	MBA-I	19.5	370 m	multiple	2001–2018	16 Nov 2018	39	Disc.: NEAT	MPC; JPL	
0	2001 TV218	MBA-M	18.1	1.3 km	multiple	2001–2019	06 Jul 2019	24	Disc.: LONEOS	MPC; JPL	
0	2001 TU222	MBA-M	17.6	900 m	multiple	2001–2018	15 Dec 2018	30	Disc.: LINEAR	MPC; JPL	
2	2001 TK224	MCA	19.88	330 m	multiple	2001–2024	31 Oct 2024	25	Disc.: Spacewatch	MPC; JPL	
0	2001 TP230	MBA-M	17.7	1.2 km	multiple	2001-2019	24 Oct 2019	42	Disc.: LPL/Spacewatch II; Alt.: 2015 SZ48	MPC; JPL	
0	2001 TP231	MBA-I	18.9	490 m	multiple	2001–2020	14 Nov 2020	37	Disc.: LPL/Spacewatch II; Added on 9 March 2021; Alt.: 2005 UF334, 2020 TX11	MPC; JPL	
2	2001 TU239	MBA-O	18.3	1.2 km	multiple	2001–2016	08 Aug 2016	23	Disc.: Terskol Obs.	MPC; JPL	
1	2001 TZ239	MCA	18.8	520 m	multiple	2001–2019	17 Dec 2019	31	Disc.: NEAT	MPC; JPL	
0	2001 TF242	MBA-M	18.6	570 m	multiple	2001–2021	07 Sep 2021	52	Disc.: Astrovirtel; Added on 5 November 2021; Alt.: 2021 QA13	MPC; JPL	
0	2001 TN242	MBA-I	20.0	300 m	multiple	2001–2019	19 Nov 2019	26	Disc.: Astrovirtel; Added on 30 September 2021	MPC; JPL	
0	2001 TL243	MBA-O	16.3	3.1 km	multiple	2001–2020	22 Sep 2020	39	Disc.: SDSS; Added on 17 January 2021	MPC; JPL	
0	2001 TY243	MBA-I	18.98	480 m	multiple	2001–2021	09 Nov 2021	55	Disc.: SDSS; Added on 5 November 2021; Alt.: 2021 RX96	MPC; JPL	
2	2001 TA244	MBA-O	17.6	1.7 km	multiple	2001–2018	10 Jan 2018	18	Disc.: SDSS	MPC; JPL	
0	2001 TE244	MBA-M	17.71	1.6 km	multiple	2001–2020	23 Oct 2020	36	Disc.: SDSS; Added on 11 May 2021	MPC; JPL	
0	2001 TK244	MBA-M	17.6	1.3 km	multiple	2001–2018	13 Jul 2018	60	Disc.: SDSS	MPC; JPL	
0	2001 TD245	MBA-M	17.8	1.5 km	multiple	2001–2019	26 Sep 2019	50	Disc.: SDSS; Alt.: 2010 MP6	MPC; JPL	
0	2001 TL245	MBA-O	17.3	1.9 km	multiple	2001–2019	03 Jan 2019	60	Disc.: SDSS; Alt.: 2013 YT133	MPC; JPL	
–	2001 TY245	MBA-O	17.6	1.7 km	single	26 days	15 Oct 2001	7	Disc.: SDSS	MPC; JPL	
0	2001 TM246	MBA-I	18.77	520 m	multiple	2001–2021	04 Jan 2021	38	Disc.: SDSS; Added on 21 August 2021; Alt.: 2012 QC70	MPC; JPL	
0	2001 TP246	MBA-O	17.8	1.5 km	multiple	2001–2017	07 Dec 2017	26	Disc.: SDSS; Added on 21 August 2021; Alt.: 2017 VX37	MPC; JPL	
0	2001 TL247	MBA-I	18.73	530 m	multiple	2001–2021	17 Jan 2021	31	Disc.: SDSS; Added on 21 August 2021; Alt.: 2012 SN93	MPC; JPL	
0	2001 TO247	MBA-M	18.3	920 m	multiple	2001–2014	18 Sep 2014	36	Disc.: SDSS; Alt.: 2014 RU32	MPC; JPL	
0	2001 TB248	MBA-O	17.4	1.8 km	multiple	2001–2017	29 Jul 2017	31	Disc.: SDSS; Alt.: 2012 TF165	MPC; JPL	
3	2001 TH248	HIL	16.4	2.9 km	multiple	2001–2017	22 Oct 2017	26	Disc.: SDSS; Added on 22 July 2020	MPC; JPL	
0	2001 TJ248	MBA-I	19.2	430 m	multiple	2001–2019	25 Sep 2019	136	Disc.: SDSS	MPC; JPL	
0	2001 TL248	MBA-M	18.1	1.3 km	multiple	2001–2019	01 Nov 2019	55	Disc.: SDSS	MPC; JPL	
0	2001 TK249	MBA-I	18.8	520 m	multiple	2001–2019	03 Oct 2019	48	Disc.: SDSS	MPC; JPL	
0	2001 TZ249	MBA-O	16.9	2.3 km	multiple	2001–2019	25 Nov 2019	31	Disc.: SDSS; Added on 22 July 2020	MPC; JPL	
0	2001 TJ250	MBA-I	19.65	350 m	multiple	2001–2021	09 Dec 2021	41	Disc.: SDSS; Added on 21 August 2021	MPC; JPL	
0	2001 TK250	MBA-I	19.1	450 m	multiple	2001–2020	23 Sep 2020	45	Disc.: SDSS	MPC; JPL	
0	2001 TL250	MBA-I	18.1	710 m	multiple	2001–2020	10 Dec 2020	67	Disc.: SDSS; Alt.: 2012 QU42	MPC; JPL	
0	2001 TB251	MBA-O	17.8	1.5 km	multiple	2001–2018	06 Oct 2018	38	Disc.: SDSS	MPC; JPL	
1	2001 TN251	MBA-O	17.33	1.9 km	multiple	2001–2021	03 Oct 2021	29	Disc.: SDSS	MPC; JPL	
0	2001 TS251	MBA-M	17.86	860 m	multiple	2001-2022	26 Dec 2022	50	Disc.: SDSS	MPC; JPL	
0	2001 TE252	MBA-I	18.9	490 m	multiple	2001–2020	06 Dec 2020	39	Disc.: SDSS; Added on 22 July 2020	MPC; JPL	
0	2001 TM252	MBA-M	18.3	920 m	multiple	2001–2019	02 Dec 2019	31	Disc.: SDSS; Alt.: 2014 SP78	MPC; JPL	
0	2001 TR252	MBA-M	18.0	1.1 km	multiple	2001–2020	03 Jan 2020	41	Disc.: SDSS	MPC; JPL	
1	2001 TT252	MBA-M	18.2	1.3 km	multiple	2001–2019	28 Oct 2019	31	Disc.: SDSS; Added on 21 August 2021	MPC; JPL	
–	2001 TL253	MBA-M	19.3	410 m	single	11 days	25 Oct 2001	9	Disc.: SDSS	MPC; JPL	
0	2001 TX253	MBA-M	18.1	710 m	multiple	2001–2015	22 Jan 2015	16	Disc.: SDSS; Alt.: 2015 BN347	MPC; JPL	
0	2001 TB254	MBA-M	18.6	800 m	multiple	2001–2018	08 Jul 2018	19	Disc.: SDSS; Added on 21 August 2021	MPC; JPL	
0	2001 TC254	MBA-I	19.32	410 m	multiple	2001–2021	30 Nov 2021	45	Disc.: SDSS	MPC; JPL	
0	2001 TG254	MBA-O	17.26	2.0 km	multiple	2001–2021	17 Apr 2021	29	Disc.: SDSS; Added on 21 August 2021; Alt.: 2016 HH33	MPC; JPL	
0	2001 TE255	HIL	16.3	3.1 km	multiple	2001–2017	23 Sep 2017	22	Disc.: SDSS; Added on 22 July 2020	MPC; JPL	
0	2001 TG255	MBA-O	17.3	1.9 km	multiple	2001–2018	04 Dec 2018	49	Disc.: SDSS; Alt.: 2007 VD264	MPC; JPL	
0	2001 TH255	MBA-O	17.3	1.9 km	multiple	2001–2017	29 Sep 2017	29	Disc.: SDSS; Alt.: 2015 HG129	MPC; JPL	
0	2001 TS255	MBA-O	17.3	1.9 km	multiple	2001–2017	14 Dec 2017	31	Disc.: SDSS	MPC; JPL	
1	2001 TD257	MBA-I	19.18	430 m	multiple	2001–2021	10 Nov 2021	43	Disc.: NEAT	MPC; JPL	
1	2001 TP257	MBA-M	19.49	380 m	multiple	2001-2022	19 Dec 2022	64	Disc.: NEAT	MPC; JPL	
1	2001 TR257	MBA-M	19.3	770 m	multiple	2001–2015	03 Dec 2015	24	Disc.: NEAT	MPC; JPL	
0	2001 TE259	MBA-I	18.9	490 m	multiple	2001–2019	24 Dec 2019	57	Disc.: NEAT	MPC; JPL	
3	2001 TG260	MBA-M	19.45	610 m	single	2001-2019	02 Nov 2019	14	Disc.: SDSS	MPC; JPL	
0	2001 TL260	MBA-O	17.3	1.9 km	multiple	2001–2021	20 Mar 2021	39	Disc.: SDSS	MPC; JPL	
2	2001 TM260	MBA-I	19.93	300 m	multiple	2001-2024	09 Oct 2024	33	Disc.: SDSS; Alt.: 2024 RU113	MPC; JPL	
1	2001 TD261	MBA-M	18.16	620 m	multiple	2001-2025	19 Aug 2025	23	Disc.: NEAT	MPC; JPL	
–	2001 TH261	MBA-M	19.4	390 m	single	13 days	23 Oct 2001	12	Disc.: NEAT	MPC; JPL	
1	2001 TC262	MBA-M	18.35	780 m	multiple	2001-2022	26 Nov 2022	22	Disc.: NEAT	MPC; JPL	
0	2001 TP265 = (887169)	MBA-I	18.43	610 m	multiple	2001–2021	05 Dec 2021	76	Disc.: NEAT	MPC; JPL; SDSS]]	MPC; JPL
0	2001 TT265	MBA-I	19.21	430 m	multiple	2001–2021	08 Sep 2021	48	Disc.: LPL/Spacewatch II	MPC; JPL	
0	2001 TX265	MBA-I	18.94	480 m	multiple	2001–2021	18 Jan 2021	46	Disc.: SDSS	MPC; JPL	
0	2001 TY265	MBA-I	18.49	600 m	multiple	2001–2021	14 Apr 2021	77	Disc.: NEAT	MPC; JPL	
0	2001 TU266	MBA-M	18.09	1.0 km	multiple	2001–2021	20 Mar 2021	45	Disc.: SDSS	MPC; JPL	
1	2001 TW266	MCA	19.3	410 m	multiple	2001–2019	08 May 2019	40	Disc.: SDSS	MPC; JPL	
0	2001 TB267	MBA-I	18.6	570 m	multiple	2001–2018	02 Nov 2018	47	Disc.: Spacewatch	MPC; JPL	
0	2001 TD267	MBA-M	18.1	1.3 km	multiple	2001–2019	29 Oct 2019	39	Disc.: SDSS	MPC; JPL	
0	2001 TE267	MBA-I	19.0	470 m	multiple	2001–2019	28 Nov 2019	36	Disc.: Spacewatch	MPC; JPL	
1	2001 TH267	MBA-I	18.5	590 m	multiple	2001–2020	22 Jan 2020	43	Disc.: SDSS	MPC; JPL	
0	2001 TJ267	MBA-I	19.1	450 m	multiple	2001–2019	08 Nov 2019	43	Disc.: Spacewatch	MPC; JPL	
0	2001 TM267	MBA-M	18.2	680 m	multiple	2001–2018	15 Dec 2018	31	Disc.: SDSS	MPC; JPL	
1	2001 TO267	MBA-I	18.5	590 m	multiple	2001–2019	06 Sep 2019	30	Disc.: Spacewatch	MPC; JPL	
0	2001 TP267	MBA-I	18.8	520 m	multiple	2001–2019	22 Aug 2019	31	Disc.: Spacewatch	MPC; JPL	
0	2001 TQ267	MBA-I	18.8	520 m	multiple	2001–2019	23 Sep 2019	34	Disc.: SDSS	MPC; JPL	
1	2001 TR267	MBA-I	18.9	490 m	multiple	2001–2017	30 Aug 2017	32	Disc.: SDSS		
0	2001 TV267	MBA-I	18.5	590 m	multiple	2001–2019	20 Dec 2019	59	Disc.: NEAT	MPC; JPL	
0	2001 TC268	MBA-M	17.8	1.5 km	multiple	2001–2019	27 Oct 2019	56	Disc.: Spacewatch; Alt.: 2010 KC103	MPC; JPL	
0	2001 TG268	MBA-I	18.5	590 m	multiple	2001–2019	23 Sep 2019	40	Disc.: SDSS	MPC; JPL	
0	2001 TP268	MBA-M	18.3	650 m	multiple	2001–2020	19 Apr 2020	28	Disc.: SDSS	MPC; JPL	
0	2001 TQ268	MBA-M	17.8	1.5 km	multiple	2001–2019	28 Aug 2019	30	Disc.: LPL/Spacewatch II	MPC; JPL	
0	2001 TV268	MBA-M	17.7	1.2 km	multiple	2001–2020	26 Jan 2020	45	Disc.: SDSS	MPC; JPL	
1	2001 TX268	MBA-I	18.9	490 m	multiple	2001–2019	28 Oct 2019	23	Disc.: SDSS	MPC; JPL	
0	2001 TQ269	MBA-I	19.7	340 m	multiple	2001–2020	14 Dec 2020	51	Disc.: SDSS; Added on 17 January 2021	MPC; JPL	
1	2001 TX269	MBA-M	18.99	670 m	multiple	2001–2018	07 Nov 2018	20	Disc.: SDSS; Added on 21 August 2021	MPC; JPL	
1	2001 TZ269	MCA	20.74	210 m	multiple	2001–2021	05 Oct 2021	38	Disc.: LPL/Spacewatch II; Added on 30 September 2021	MPC; JPL	

back to top
