= List of unnumbered minor planets: 2001 P–R =

This is a partial list of unnumbered minor planets for principal provisional designations assigned between 1 August and 15 September 2001. As of May 2026, a total of 197 bodies remain unnumbered for this period. Objects for this year are listed on the following pages: A–E · F_{i} · F_{ii} · G–O · P–R · S · T · U · V–W and X–Y. Also see previous and next year.

Near-Earth obj.	MBA (inner)	MBA (outer)	Centaur
Mars-crosser	MBA (middle)	Jupiter trojan	Trans-Neptunian obj.
Unclassified

== P ==
U	Designation	Class	Physical		Observations				Description and notes	Ref
U	Designation	Class	H	D	Opp.	Arc	Last	Used	Description and notes	Ref
6	2001 PJ	AMO	21.3	200 m	single	57 days	30 Sep 2001	42	Disc.: AMOS	MPC; JPL
1	2001 PH9	AMO	21.3	200 m	multiple	2001–2019	04 Nov 2019	74	Disc.: NEAT	MPC; JPL
1	2001 PU9	AMO	19.43	460 m	multiple	2001–2021	28 May 2021	74	Disc.: AMOS	MPC; JPL
1	2001 PU13	MCA	18.0	750 m	multiple	2001–2020	22 Jan 2020	88	Disc.: NEAT; Alt.: 2015 XU261	MPC; JPL
2	2001 PF14	AMO	19.5	450 m	multiple	2001–2007	25 Apr 2007	77	Disc.: NEAT	MPC; JPL
0	2001 PG14	APO	22.82	110 m	multiple	2001-2026	12 Aug 2026	85	Disc.: NEAT	MPC; JPL
2	2001 PC15	MBA-M	18.1	1.0 km	multiple	2001–2019	03 Jan 2019	108	Disc.: AMOS	MPC; JPL
1	2001 PL24	MBA-M	17.5	1.3 km	multiple	2001–2023	02 May 2023	45	Disc.: AMOS; Alt.: 2019 TR28	MPC; JPL
4	2001 PJ29	APO	23.0	89 m	single	15 days	30 Aug 2001	67	Disc.: AMOS	MPC; JPL
3	2001 PX30	MBA-M	17.8	820 m	multiple	2001-2021	11 Jun 2021	18	Disc.: NEAT	MPC; JPL
1	2001 PR36	MBA-M	17.4	1.4 km	multiple	1997–2014	15 Dec 2014	87	Disc.: NEAT; Alt.: 2010 VV197	MPC; JPL
4	2001 PK47	TNO	7.32	176 km	multiple	2001–2020	09 Dec 2020	34	Disc.: Mauna Kea Obs. LoUTNOs, cubewano (hot)	MPC; JPL
2	2001 PX51	MBA-O	17.1	2.1 km	multiple	2001–2017	23 Oct 2017	35	Disc.: AMOS; Alt.: 2017 NN3	MPC; JPL; }
2	2001 PJ65	MCA	18.8	520 m	multiple	2001–2013	05 May 2013	81	Disc.: NEAT	MPC; JPL
2	2001 PY67	MBA-I	18.7	540 m	multiple	2001–2016	07 May 2016	29	Disc.: NEAT	MPC; JPL
2	2001 PF68	MBA-I	18.6	570 m	multiple	2001–2019	06 Apr 2019	33	Disc.: AMOS; Added on 9 March 2021	MPC; JPL

back to top

== Q ==
U	Designation	Class	Physical		Observations				Description and notes	Ref
U	Designation	Class	H	D	Opp.	Arc	Last	Used	Description and notes	Ref
1	2001 QJ	AMO	21.2	200 m	multiple	2001–2019	05 Nov 2019	51	Disc.: LINEAR	MPC; JPL
1	2001 QP2	MCA	18.1	710 m	multiple	2001–2015	20 Jun 2015	80	Disc.: LINEAR	MPC; JPL
1	2001 QR33	MCA	19.4	390 m	multiple	2001–2019	18 Nov 2019	103	Disc.: NEAT	MPC; JPL
1	2001 QT33	MCA	20.55	310 m	multiple	2001-2026	23 Jun 2026	63	Disc.: NEAT	MPC; JPL
3	2001 QA34	MCA	19.0	670 m	multiple	2001–2018	29 Sep 2018	48	Disc.: NEAT	MPC; JPL
0	2001 QB34	AMO	19.69	410 m	multiple	2001–2014	23 Nov 2014	69	Disc.: NEAT	MPC; JPL
7	2001 QD34	AMO	22.8	98 m	single	10 days	27 Aug 2001	30	Disc.: LINEAR	MPC; JPL
0	2001 QE34	APO	19.0	560 m	multiple	2001–2020	16 Oct 2020	397	Disc.: LINEAR	MPC; JPL
6	2001 QE71	APO	24.4	47 m	single	25 days	13 Sep 2001	68	Disc.: LINEAR	MPC; JPL
5	2001 QO72	MCA	19.1	450 m	single	67 days	15 Oct 2001	55	Disc.: NEAT	MPC; JPL
2	2001 QC88	MBA-I	19.35	410 m	multiple	2001-2022	24 Oct 2022	48	Disc.: Spacewatch; Alt.: 2022 OF50	MPC; JPL
0	2001 QP88	MBA-O	17.7	1.6 km	multiple	2001–2019	14 Jan 2019	50	Disc.: Spacewatch	MPC; JPL
1	2001 QU92	MBA-M	18.15	700 m	multiple	2001–2021	08 Jun 2021	32	Disc.: LINEAR	MPC; JPL
1	2001 QB95	MBA-O	16.9	2.3 km	multiple	2001–2019	24 Dec 2019	38	Disc.: Spacewatch	MPC; JPL
0	2001 QA96	MBA-I	18.98	480 m	multiple	2001–2021	02 Oct 2021	73	Disc.: Spacewatch	MPC; JPL
4	2001 QF96	APO	24.5	45 m	single	26 days	13 Sep 2001	59	Disc.: Spacewatch	MPC; JPL
0	2001 QJ96	APO	22.27	120 m	multiple	2001–2021	03 Sep 2021	76	Disc.: LONEOS; Alt.: 2015 PK229	MPC; JPL
0	2001 QS108	MCA	19.05	460 m	multiple	2001–2021	28 Nov 2021	169	Disc.: LINEAR	MPC; JPL
0	2001 QH112	MBA-M	17.8	1.2 km	multiple	2001–2020	26 Jan 2020	77	Disc.: LINEAR; Alt.: 2014 RG53	MPC; JPL
1	2001 QN112	MCA	18.23	680 m	multiple	2001-2022	30 Dec 2022	85	Disc.: LINEAR	MPC; JPL
2	2001 QO132	MBA-M	17.5	1.3 km	multiple	2001–2018	13 Jul 2018	35	Disc.: LINEAR	MPC; JPL
0	2001 QG142	AMO	18.2	810 m	multiple	2001–2019	29 May 2019	238	Disc.: LINEAR; NEO larger than 1 kilometer	MPC; JPL
0	2001 QJ142	APO	23.99	65 m	multiple	2001–2024	20 Feb 2024	102	Disc.: LINEAR	MPC; JPL
1	2001 QM142	APO	22.54	120 m	multiple	2001–2023	17 Aug 2023	49	Disc.: Spacewatch	MPC; JPL
0	2001 QN142	APO	21.75	160 m	multiple	2001–2023	27 Mar 2023	61	Disc.: LINEAR; Alt.: 2012 HP2	MPC; JPL
2	2001 QO142	APO	19.3	490 m	multiple	2001–2008	07 May 2008	57	Disc.: LINEAR	MPC; JPL
8	2001 QP142	AMO	24.1	54 m	single	26 days	20 Sep 2001	24	Disc.: LINEAR	MPC; JPL
2	2001 QT144	MBA-M	18.0	750 m	multiple	2001–2021	10 Sep 2021	33	Disc.: Spacewatch; Added on 30 September 2021	MPC; JPL
1	2001 QK153	APO	20.69	270 m	multiple	2001-2024	17 Feb 2024	37	Disc.: LINEAR	MPC; JPL
1	2001 QL153	AMO	19.0	560 m	multiple	2001–2008	17 Sep 2008	60	Disc.: NEAT	MPC; JPL
8	2001 QL163	APO	22.6	110 m	single	13 days	07 Sep 2001	19	Disc.: LINEAR	MPC; JPL
0	2001 QM163	APO	19.97	390 m	multiple	2001–2026	28 Feb03 Mar 2026	109	Disc.: NEAT	MPC; JPL
1	2001 QL169	MCA	18.16	950 m	multiple	2001–2023	12 Jul 2023	92	Disc.: NEAT	MPC; JPL
2	2001 QA176	MBA-I	18.8	520 m	multiple	2001–2016	05 Nov 2016	30	Disc.: Spacewatch; Added on 21 August 2021; Alt.: 2005 VE20	MPC; JPL
0	2001 QJ176	MBA-M	18.2	960 m	multiple	2001–2018	13 Aug 2018	33	Disc.: Spacewatch	MPC; JPL
1	2001 QB177	MCA	18.98	480 m	multiple	2001–2021	28 Nov 2021	60	Disc.: Spacewatch	MPC; JPL
0	2001 QN186	MBA-O	17.9	1.5 km	multiple	2001–2017	06 Nov 2017	90	Disc.: Spacewatch	MPC; JPL
3	2001 QL205	MBA-M	17.9	780 m	multiple	2001–2019	11 Jan 2019	26	Disc.: LINEAR	MPC; JPL
1	2001 QB207	MBA-O	17.4	1.8 km	multiple	2001–2018	09 Nov 2018	66	Disc.: LINEAR	MPC; JPL
1	2001 QS209	MBA-M	17.4	980 m	multiple	2001–2014	21 Dec 2014	32	Disc.: LONEOS	MPC; JPL
2	2001 QX224	MBA-I	18.7	540 m	multiple	2001–2013	26 Nov 2013	26	Disc.: Spacewatch; Added on 22 July 2020; Alt.: 2009 UA134	MPC; JPL
2	2001 QA225	MCA	18.3	920 m	multiple	2001–2018	12 Nov 2018	55	Disc.: NEAT	MPC; JPL
0	2001 QB262	MBA-M	17.2	1.5 km	multiple	2001–2020	19 Jan 2020	104	Disc.: LINEAR	MPC; JPL
2	2001 QM268	MBA-M	18.1	1.0 km	multiple	2001–2014	20 Nov 2014	69	Disc.: NEAT	MPC; JPL
0	2001 QG288	MBA-O	16.2	3.2 km	multiple	2001–2018	13 Dec 2018	64	Disc.: NEAT	MPC; JPL
0	2001 QS290	MBA-I	16.5	590 m	multiple	2001-2024	27 Dec 2024	165	Disc.: LINEAR	MPC; JPL
3	2001 QQ297	TNO	7.0	132 km	multiple	2001–2013	05 Oct 2013	18	Disc.: Cerro Tololo; LoUTNOs, cubewano (cold)	MPC; JPL
5	2001 QS297	TNO	6.16	285 km	multiple	2001-2025	14 Sep 2025	17	Disc.: Cerro Tololo; LoUTNOs, cubewano?	MPC; JPL
E	2001 QU297	TNO	6.0	217 km	single	23 days	12 Sep 2001	6	Disc.: Cerro Tololo; LoUTNOs, cubewano?	MPC; JPL
E	2001 QV297	TNO	6.3	189 km	single	1 day	21 Aug 2001	4	Disc.: Cerro Tololo; LoUTNOs, cubewano?	MPC; JPL
3	2001 QX297	TNO	6.3	183 km	multiple	2000–2009	20 Nov 2009	31	Disc.: Cerro Tololo; LoUTNOs, cubewano (cold)	MPC; JPL
3	2001 QZ297	TNO	6.9	139 km	multiple	2000–2019	04 Sep 2019	30	Disc.: Cerro Tololo; LoUTNOs, cubewano (cold)	MPC; JPL
2	2001 QA298	TNO	7.6	126 km	multiple	2000–2014	19 Sep 2014	25	Disc.: Cerro Tololo; LoUTNOs, other TNO	MPC; JPL
0	2001 QU298	MBA-M	18.15	990 m	multiple	2001–2021	18 Jan 2021	36	Disc.: Cerro Tololo; Added on 22 July 2020; Alt.: 2015 VG184	MPC; JPL
3	2001 QZ298	MBA-I	19.1	450 m	multiple	2001–2020	14 Feb 2020	26	Disc.: Cerro Tololo; Added on 22 July 2020	MPC; JPL
0	2001 QV300	MBA-O	17.5	1.8 km	multiple	2001–2021	04 Oct 2021	33	Disc.: Cerro Tololo Obs. Added on 29 January 2022	MPC; JPL
0	2001 QY300	MBA-I	19.0	470 m	multiple	2001–2020	12 Sep 2020	44	Disc.: Cerro Tololo	MPC; JPL
0	2001 QL301	MBA-O	17.88	1.5 km	multiple	2001–2021	10 May 2021	32	Disc.: Cerro Tololo	MPC; JPL
0	2001 QP301	MBA-O	17.96	2.8 km	multiple	2001-1026	18 Jan 2026	47	Disc.: Cerro Tololo	MPC; JPL
0	2001 QX301	MBA-I	19.07	520 m	multiple	2001–2024	03 Jan 2024	38	Disc.: Cerro Tololo; Added on 17 June 2021	MPC; JPL
4	2001 QG302	MBA-I	18.21	680 m	multiple	2001-2022	24 Dec 2022	14	Disc.: Cerro Tololo	MPC; JPL
3	2001 QW302	MBA-I	19.3	410 m	multiple	2001–2020	16 Dec 2020	29	Disc.: Cerro Tololo; Added on 21 August 2021; Alt.: 2020 XS18	MPC; JPL
–	2001 QF303	MBA-I	18.5	590 m	single	2 days	21 Aug 2001	6	Disc.: Cerro Tololo	MPC; JPL
–	2001 QG303	MBA-I	20.0	300 m	single	2 days	21 Aug 2001	6	Disc.: Cerro Tololo	MPC; JPL
0	2001 QB304	MBA-M	18.1	1.0 km	multiple	2001–2020	27 Jan 2020	39	Disc.: Cerro Tololo; Added on 22 July 2020; Alt.: 2016 CC92	MPC; JPL
–	2001 QE306	MBA-I	18.7	540 m	single	2 days	21 Aug 2001	6	Disc.: Cerro Tololo	MPC; JPL
1	2001 QJ306	MBA-I	19.6	360 m	multiple	2001–2019	23 Oct 2019	25	Disc.: Cerro Tololo	MPC; JPL
–	2001 QL306	MBA-M	18.8	730 m	single	2 days	21 Aug 2001	6	Disc.: Cerro Tololo	MPC; JPL
0	2001 QS306	MBA-O	17.37	2.3 km	multiple	2001–2025	09 Dec 2025	57	Disc.: Cerro Tololo	MPC; JPL
–	2001 QA307	MBA-O	17.6	1.7 km	single	2 days	21 Aug 2001	6	Disc.: Cerro Tololo	MPC; JPL
–	2001 QG307	MBA-M	17.9	1.5 km	single	2 days	21 Aug 2001	6	Disc.: Cerro Tololo	MPC; JPL
–	2001 QS307	MBA-O	16.6	2.7 km	single	2 days	21 Aug 2001	6	Disc.: Cerro Tololo	MPC; JPL
4	2001 QU307	MBA-O	17.8	1.6 km	multiple	2001-2013	12 Feb 2013	14	Disc.: Cerro Tololo	MPC; JPL
E	2001 QJ308	MBA-O	18.0	1.4 km	single	2 days	21 Aug 2001	6	Disc.: Cerro Tololo	MPC; JPL
2	2001 QP308	MBA-I	19.4	390 m	multiple	2001–2019	24 Oct 2019	22	Disc.: Cerro Tololo	MPC; JPL
2	2001 QA309	MBA-I	19.4	390 m	multiple	2001–2019	28 Aug 2019	21	Disc.: Cerro Tololo; Added on 21 August 2021; Alt.: 2019 PU64	MPC; JPL
0	2001 QO309	MBA-M	17.9	1.1 km	multiple	2001–2018	11 Aug 2018	31	Disc.: Cerro Tololo; Added on 22 July 2020	MPC; JPL
0	2001 QA311	MBA-I	18.75	530 m	multiple	2001–2021	11 Oct 2021	45	Disc.: Cerro Tololo; Alt.: 2016 GC288	MPC; JPL
1	2001 QB311	MBA-I	18.66	550 m	multiple	2001–2022	07 Jan 2022	51	Disc.: Cerro Tololo	MPC; JPL
0	2001 QN311	MBA-I	19.08	450 m	multiple	2001–2021	29 Oct 2021	58	Disc.: Cerro Tololo; Added on 5 November 2021; Alt.: 2021 PQ105	MPC; JPL
0	2001 QY311	MBA-O	17.95	1.4 km	multiple	2001–2021	08 Sep 2021	50	Disc.: Cerro Tololo; Alt.: 2021 NY17	MPC; JPL
3	2001 QB312	MBA-O	17.2	2.0 km	multiple	2001–2020	27 Jan 2020	25	Disc.: Cerro Tololo; Added on 22 July 2020	MPC; JPL
1	2001 QX312	MBA-O	17.2	2.0 km	multiple	2001–2018	14 Aug 2018	22	Disc.: Cerro Tololo	MPC; JPL
5	2001 QU313	MBA-O	18.0	1.4 km	multiple	2001–2016	01 Apr 2016	32	Disc.: Cerro Tololo	MPC; JPL
0	2001 QO317	MBA-M	17.8	1.5 km	multiple	2001–2019	25 Sep 2019	38	Disc.: Cerro Tololo; Added on 21 August 2021; Alt.: 2006 UZ205	MPC; JPL
0	2001 QP317	MBA-O	17.9	1.5 km	multiple	2001–2020	26 Jan 2020	28	Disc.: Cerro Tololo; Alt.: 2007 TQ284	MPC; JPL
0	2001 QL318	MBA-O	17.3	1.9 km	multiple	2001–2019	03 Dec 2019	26	Disc.: Cerro Tololo	MPC; JPL
0	2001 QJ319	MBA-O	17.2	2.0 km	multiple	2001–2021	07 Jun 2021	38	Disc.: Cerro Tololo; Added on 22 July 2020	MPC; JPL
0	2001 QK319	MBA-O	17.2	2.0 km	multiple	1999–2020	11 Dec 2020	47	Disc.: Cerro Tololo; Alt.: 2010 CP39	MPC; JPL
0	2001 QP319	MBA-O	16.8	2.4 km	multiple	2001–2019	08 Oct 2019	23	Disc.: Cerro Tololo; Added on 22 July 2020	MPC; JPL
5	2001 QT319	MBA-O	18.46	1 km	multiple	2001-2023	06 Dec 2023	19	Disc.: Cerro Tololo; Alt.: 2023 WA20	MPC; JPL
–	2001 QY319	MBA-O	18.1	1.3 km	single	23 days	12 Sep 2001	6	Disc.: Cerro Tololo	MPC; JPL
0	2001 QC321	MBA-O	17.61	1.7 km	multiple	2001-2028	06 Oct 2018	24	Disc.: Cerro Tololo	MPC; JPL
0	2001 QQ321	MBA-I	18.4	620 m	multiple	2001–2016	08 Jun 2016	37	Disc.: Cerro Tololo; Added on 22 July 2020	MPC; JPL
E	2001 QV321	MBA-M	18.3	1.2 km	single	2 days	21 Aug 2001	6	Disc.: Cerro Tololo	MPC; JPL
–	2001 QA322	MBA-I	19.5	370 m	single	2 days	21 Aug 2001	6	Disc.: Cerro Tololo	MPC; JPL
0	2001 QD322	MBA-I	18.7	540 m	multiple	2001–2020	11 Nov 2020	29	Disc.: Cerro Tololo	MPC; JPL
4	2001 QW322	TNO	7.9	128 km	multiple	2001–2019	04 Sep 2019	55	Disc.: Mauna Kea Obs. LoUTNOs, cubewano (cold), albedo: 0.093; binary: 126 km	MPC; JPL
0	2001 QB326	MBA-O	17.16	2.1 km	multiple	2001–2021	15 Apr 2021	64	Disc.: Cerro Tololo; Added on 22 July 2020	MPC; JPL
1	2001 QM326	MBA-I	19.2	430 m	multiple	2001–2020	16 Aug 2020	33	Disc.: Cerro Tololo; Added on 21 August 2021; Alt.: 2017 RN127	MPC; JPL
E	2001 QO326	HIL	16.1	3.4 km	single	2 days	21 Aug 2001	6	Disc.: Cerro Tololo	MPC; JPL
0	2001 QP331	JT	14.82	6.1 km	multiple	2001-2025	15 Sep 2025	48	Disc.: La Palma Obs. Trojan camp (L5); Alt.: 2001 QQ331	MPC; JPL
–	2001 QR331	MBA-M	18.7	760 m	single	2001-2025	15 Oct 2025	21	Disc.: La Palma Obs.	MPC; JPL
1	2001 QS331	JT	15192	5.1 km	multiple	6 days	25 Aug 2001	30	Disc.: La Palma Obs. Trojan camp (L5)	MPC; JPL
1	2001 QT331	HUN	19.1	450 m	multiple	2001–2020	13 Nov 2020	39	Disc.: La Palma Obs. Added on 17 January 2021	MPC; JPL
–	2001 QU331	JT	15.4	4.6 km	single	3 days	26 Aug 2001	9	Disc.: La Palma Obs. Trojan camp (L5)	MPC; JPL
1	2001 QX338	MBA-O	18.29	1.2 km	multiple	2001–2021	08 Sep 2021	37	Disc.: Spacewatch	MPC; JPL
2	2001 QC339	MBA-M	18.2	680 m	multiple	2001–2021	07 Jun 2021	55	Disc.: Spacewatch	MPC; JPL
2	2001 QE339	HIL	16.0	3.5 km	multiple	1993–2017	21 Sep 2017	27	Disc.: Spacewatch; Added on 22 July 2020	MPC; JPL
4	2001 QG339	MBA-I	19.7	340 m	multiple	2001–2015	12 Sep 2015	27	Disc.: Spacewatch; Added on 19 October 2020	MPC; JPL
2	2001 QH339	MBA-M	18.7	540 m	multiple	2001–2018	13 Dec 2018	26	Disc.: Spacewatch; Added on 19 October 2020	MPC; JPL
0	2001 QK339	MBA-I	18.7	540 m	multiple	2001–2020	26 Sep 2020	39	Disc.: Spacewatch; Added on 17 January 2021	MPC; JPL
1	2001 QN339	MBA-O	18.0	1.4 km	multiple	2001–2021	08 May 2021	20	Disc.: Cerro Tololo; Added on 17 June 2021	MPC; JPL
0	2001 QO339	MBA-O	17.64	1.7 km	multiple	2001–2021	31 Aug 2021	42	Disc.: Spacewatch; Added on 21 August 2021	MPC; JPL

back to top

== R ==
U	Designation	Class	Physical		Observations				Description and notes	Ref
U	Designation	Class	H	D	Opp.	Arc	Last	Used	Description and notes	Ref
0	2001 RD2	MCA	17.76	830 m	multiple	2001–2019	08 Feb 2019	71	Disc.: LINEAR	MPC; JPL
0	2001 RG2	MBA-M	17.6	1.3 km	multiple	2001–2020	19 Jan 2020	58	Disc.: LINEAR	MPC; JPL
2	2001 RO3	APO	23.5	71 m	single	34 days	11 Oct 2001	68	Disc.: LINEAR; AMO at MPC	MPC; JPL
4	2001 RP3	AMO	23.4	74 m	single	33 days	11 Oct 2001	61	Disc.: LONEOS	MPC; JPL
1	2001 RR3	MCA	17.9	780 m	multiple	2001–2020	04 Dec 2020	102	Disc.: LINEAR	MPC; JPL
2	2001 RM8	MBA-M	17.7	1.6 km	multiple	2001–2019	31 Oct 2019	101	Disc.: LINEAR; Alt.: 2010 KM51	MPC; JPL
1	2001 RJ10	MCA	19.84	430 m	multiple	2001-2025	22 Jun 2025	45	Disc.: LINEAR	MPC; JPL
0	2001 RF13	MCA	19.38	400 m	multiple	2001–2021	30 Nov 2021	68	Disc.: LINEAR	MPC; JPL
2	2001 RE16	MCA	19.37	530 m	multiple	2001-2023	03 Oct 2023	55	Disc.: LINEAR; MBA at MPC	MPC; JPL
0	2001 RQ17	APO	22.6	110 m	multiple	2001–2018	18 Oct 2018	182	Disc.: LINEAR; AMO at MPC	MPC; JPL
0	2001 RW17	APO	20.3	310 m	multiple	2001–2019	25 Sep 2019	257	Disc.: LONEOS	MPC; JPL
4	2001 RX17	AMO	20.0	360 m	single	119 days	08 Jan 2002	62	Disc.: LONEOS	MPC; JPL
0	2001 RA18	AMO	19.54	440 m	multiple	2001–2019	13 Jan 2019	64	Disc.: LINEAR	MPC; JPL
1	2001 RT21	MBA-O	17.62	1.7 km	multiple	2001-2022	01 Dec 2022	63	Disc.: LINEAR; Alt.: 2022 SD241	MPC; JPL
3	2001 RF33	MBA-M	18.7	540 m	multiple	2001–2005	16 Jun 2005	15	Disc.: LINEAR	MPC; JPL
0	2001 RA40	MBA-I	18.8	520 m	multiple	2001–2019	28 Oct 2019	60	Disc.: LINEAR	MPC; JPL
0	2001 RR40	MCA	17.72	900 m	multiple	2001–2022	24 Dec 2022	286	Disc.: LINEAR	MPC; JPL
0	2001 RG42	MBA-M	18.04	1.0 km	multiple	2001–2019	30 Dec 2019	37	Disc.: LINEAR; Alt.: 2014 SP289	MPC; JPL
5	2001 RN43	MCA	18.4	1.2 km	single	66 days	25 Oct 2001	41	Disc.: LINEAR	MPC; JPL
1	2001 RP46	HUN	18.7	540 m	multiple	2001–2019	07 Apr 2019	51	Disc.: LINEAR; Alt.: 2016 DH1	MPC; JPL
0	2001 RQ46	MCA	18.12	710 m	multiple	2001–2021	09 Nov 2021	70	Disc.: LINEAR	MPC; JPL
2	2001 RH47	MBA-I	18.0	750 m	multiple	2001–2015	15 Oct 2015	47	Disc.: LINEAR	MPC; JPL
1	2001 RX47	AMO	19.89	370 m	multiple	2001–2021	18 Jun 2021	53	Disc.: LINEAR; Alt.: 2021 LO1	MPC; JPL
3	2001 RU55	MBA-I	18.1	710 m	multiple	2001–2021	18 Jan 2021	33	Disc.: LINEAR; Alt.: 2012 TD60	MPC; JPL
2	2001 RV58	MBA-I	18.1	710 m	multiple	2001–2020	20 Jul 2020	37	Disc.: LINEAR; Added on 24 August 2020	MPC; JPL
3	2001 RO97	MBA-O	17.91	1.5 km	multiple	2001–2018	06 Oct 2018	21	Disc.: Spacewatch; Added on 24 December 2021	MPC; JPL
1	2001 RB98	MBA-M	18.97	700 m	multiple	2001-2022	19 Oct 2022	42	Disc.: Spacewatch; Alt.: 2018 VQ57	MPC; JPL
4	2001 RN98	MBA-M	18.8	730 m	multiple	2001–2018	10 Nov 2018	21	Disc.: Spacewatch; Added on 21 August 2021	MPC; JPL
2	2001 RQ107	MBA-I	18.9	490 m	multiple	2001–2019	03 Dec 2019	36	Disc.: LINEAR	MPC; JPL
–	2001 RT107	MBA-O	15.7	4.0 km	single	7 days	19 Sep 2001	9	Disc.: LINEAR	MPC; JPL
0	2001 RE109	MBA-I	18.8	520 m	multiple	2001–2019	29 Nov 2019	82	Disc.: LINEAR	MPC; JPL
0	2001 RF109	MBA-M	18.65	580 m	multiple	2001-2023	05 Nov 2023	85	Disc.: LINEAR; Added on 21 August 2021; Alt.: 2015 HL123, 2023 QP18	MPC; JPL
1	2001 RZ109	MBA-M	17.9	1.1 km	multiple	2001–2023	22 Oct 2023	57	Disc.: LINEAR; Alt.: 2014 QY305	MPC; JPL
2	2001 RS112	MBA-M	18.1	820 m	multiple	2001-2922	26 Nov 2022	31	Disc.: LINEAR	MPC; JPL
0	2001 RZ112	MBA-M	18.0	1.4 km	multiple	2001–2019	02 Jul 2019	53	Disc.: LINEAR	MPC; JPL
1	2001 RM114	MCA	18.7	540 m	multiple	2001–2015	02 Dec 2015	57	Disc.: LINEAR; Alt.: 2008 UK235	MPC; JPL
3	2001 RZ114	MBA-I	18.2	680 m	multiple	2001–2019	24 Aug 2019	41	Disc.: LINEAR	MPC; JPL
1	2001 RJ137	MBA-M	18.57	580 m	multiple	2001-2022	18 Nov 2022	49	Disc.: LINEAR	MPC; JPL
0	2001 RM138	MCA	19.39	390 m	multiple	2001–2018	05 Nov 2018	39	Disc.: LINEAR	MPC; JPL
3	2001 RW143	TNO	7.0	132 km	multiple	2001–2013	06 Oct 2013	20	Disc.: Kitt Peak Obs. LoUTNOs, cubewano (cold)	MPC; JPL
2	2001 RY143	TNO	7.0	137 km	multiple	2001–2017	30 Aug 2017	50	Disc.: Kitt Peak Obs. LoUTNOs, cubewano?	MPC; JPL
E	2001 RL155	TNO	7.8	95 km	single	37 days	19 Oct 2001	4	Disc.: Kitt Peak Obs. LoUTNOs, cubewano?	MPC; JPL
0	2001 RF156	MBA-M	19.02	700 m	multiple	2001-2022	31 Oct 2022	73	Disc.: NEAT; Alt.: 2022 QN142	MPC; JPL
1	2001 RR156	MBA-I	18.3	650 m	multiple	2001–2019	09 May 2019	46	Disc.: Kitt Peak Obs.	MPC; JPL
0	2001 RA157	MBA-I	18.1	710 m	multiple	2001–2020	07 Dec 2020	45	Disc.: Spacewatch	MPC; JPL
0	2001 RC157	MBA-O	17.0	2.2 km	multiple	2001–2018	13 Aug 2018	29	Disc.: Kitt Peak Obs.	MPC; JPL
1	2001 RD157	MBA-I	18.7	540 m	multiple	2001–2021	16 Jan 2021	36	Disc.: Kitt Peak Obs.	MPC; JPL
1	2001 RV157	MBA-I	19.0	470 m	multiple	2001–2016	03 Nov 2016	30	Disc.: Spacewatch	MPC; JPL
0	2001 RW157	MBA-I	18.6	570 m	multiple	2001–2020	23 Oct 2020	41	Disc.: Kitt Peak Obs.	MPC; JPL
0	2001 RZ157	MBA-I	18.7	540 m	multiple	2001–2016	26 Nov 2016	22	Disc.: Kitt Peak Obs.	MPC; JPL
2	2001 RE158	MBA-I	18.7	540 m	multiple	2001–2018	03 Jun 2018	22	Disc.: Kitt Peak Obs.	MPC; JPL
0	2001 RG158	MBA-M	18.6	570 m	multiple	2001–2018	17 Nov 2018	33	Disc.: Spacewatch; Added on 19 October 2020	MPC; JPL
2	2001 RH158	MBA-M	18.5	1.1 km	multiple	2001–2019	30 Jun 2019	23	Disc.: Spacewatch; Added on 19 October 2020	MPC; JPL
1	2001 RJ158	MBA-I	18.5	590 m	multiple	2001–2020	14 Sep 2020	32	Disc.: Kitt Peak Obs. Added on 19 October 2020	MPC; JPL
0	2001 RL158	MBA-O	16.9	2.3 km	multiple	1999–2021	15 Mar 2021	43	Disc.: Kitt Peak Obs. Added on 11 May 2021	MPC; JPL
1	2001 RQ158	MBA-I	18.59	580 m	multiple	2001–2022	05 Mar 2022	37	Disc.: Kitt Peak Obs. Added on 5 November 2021	MPC; JPL

back to top
