= List of unnumbered minor planets: 2001 S =

This is a partial list of unnumbered minor planets for principal provisional designations assigned during 16–30 September 2001. As of March 2026, a total of 170 bodies remain unnumbered for this period. Objects for this year are listed on the following pages: A–E · F_{i} · F_{ii} · G–O · P–R · S · T · U · V–W and X–Y. Also see previous and next year.

Near-Earth obj.	MBA (inner)	MBA (outer)	Centaur
Mars-crosser	MBA (middle)	Jupiter trojan	Trans-Neptunian obj.
Unclassified

== S ==
U	Designation	Class	Physical		Observations				Description and notes	Ref
U	Designation	Class	H	D	Opp.	Arc	Last	Used	Description and notes	Ref
2	2001 SQ3	APO	21.6	170 m	multiple	2001–2014	30 Jan 2014	114	Disc.: LINEAR; Potentially hazardous object	MPC · JPL
5	2001 SE5	MCA	18.4	1.2 km	single	68 days	17 Oct 2001	40	Disc.: LINEAR	MPC · JPL
0	2001 SL7	MBA-I	18.6	570 m	multiple	2001–2019	02 Nov 2019	54	Disc.: LPL/Spacewatch II	MPC · JPL
0	2001 SO8	MBA-M	17.3	1.5 km	multiple	2001–2021	10 Apr 2021	107	Disc.: Spacewatch; Alt.: 2014 SX312	MPC · JPL
0	2001 SV8	MCA	20.43	240 m	multiple	2001–2021	09 Nov 2021	120	Disc.: Spacewatch; Alt.: 2011 SS68	MPC · JPL
2	2001 SJ9	AMO	19.6	430 m	multiple	1998–2004	09 Nov 2004	85	Disc.: LINEAR	MPC · JPL
1	2001 SX72	MBA-M	17.1	2.1 km	multiple	2001–2021	17 Jan 2021	65	Disc.: LINEAR; Alt.: 2010 LL81	MPC · JPL
1	2001 SE73	MCA	18.5	590 m	multiple	2001–2017	09 Dec 2017	102	Disc.: LINEAR	MPC · JPL
2	2001 SX76	MCA	19.1	450 m	multiple	2001–2014	12 Nov 2014	69	Disc.: LINEAR	MPC · JPL
2	2001 SR82	MCA	19.4	390 m	multiple	2001–2021	30 Nov 2021	58	Disc.: LINEAR; Added on 24 December 2021	MPC · JPL
2	2001 SH83	MCA	19.3	410 m	multiple	2001–2020	16 Nov 2020	87	Disc.: LINEAR	MPC · JPL
1	2001 SS86	MBA-M	18.16	1 km	multiple	2001–2023	23 Sep 2023	44	Disc.: LINEAR; Alt.: 2014 QM162	MPC · JPL
2	2001 SC90	MBA-M	18.3	920 m	multiple	2001–2018	12 Nov 2018	65	Disc.: LINEAR	MPC · JPL
2	2001 SJ94	MBA-I	19.1	450 m	multiple	2001–2019	31 Dec 2019	45	Disc.: LINEAR	MPC · JPL
1	2001 SB95	MBA-M	18.2	680 m	multiple	1997–2015	22 Jan 2015	53	Disc.: LINEAR; Alt.: 2011 BW148	MPC · JPL
1	2001 SK98	MBA-M	17.4	980 m	multiple	2001–2019	04 Jan 2019	40	Disc.: LINEAR; Alt.: 2005 QM105	MPC · JPL
1	2001 SU101	MBA-I	18.6	570 m	multiple	2001–2019	27 May 2019	51	Disc.: LINEAR; Alt.: 2005 WU98	MPC · JPL
0	2001 SG102	MBA-M	17.6	900 m	multiple	2001–2020	22 Apr 2020	33	Disc.: LINEAR	MPC · JPL
0	2001 SX102	MBA-I	17.3	1.0 km	multiple	2001–2021	06 Jan 2021	143	Disc.: LINEAR	MPC · JPL
0	2001 SM104	MCA	19.64	350 m	multiple	2001–2020	14 Aug 2020	52	Disc.: LINEAR	MPC · JPL
0	2001 SO115	MCA	18.7	540 m	multiple	2001–2017	26 Jul 2017	149	Disc.: LONEOS	MPC · JPL
1	2001 SP115	MCA	21.28	230 m	multiple	2001-2026	01 Nov 2026	68	Disc.: LINEAR	MPC · JPL
0	2001 SZ125	MBA-M	17.6	1.3 km	multiple	2001–2018	08 Aug 2018	117	Disc.: LINEAR; Alt.: 2010 VJ172, 2010 WJ22	MPC · JPL
1	2001 SL126	MBA-O	17.97	1.2 km	multiple	2001-2022	30 Oct 2022	64	Disc.: LINEAR	MPC · JPL
2	2001 ST126	MBA-M	18.6	800 m	multiple	2001–2018	15 Oct 2018	52	Disc.: LINEAR; Alt.: 2014 WA91	MPC · JPL
1	2001 SA128	MBA-I	17.9	780 m	multiple	2001–2019	14 Nov 2019	192	Disc.: LINEAR	MPC · JPL
0	2001 SN129	MCA	18.75	540 m	multiple	2001-2022	29 Oct 2022	997	Disc.: LINEAR; Alt.: 2022 QQ61	MPC · JPL
1	2001 SR129	MBA-M	17.7	1.2 km	multiple	2001–2018	10 Jul 2018	56	Disc.: LINEAR	MPC · JPL
2	2001 SK133	MBA-M	17.1	1.1 km	multiple	2001–2016	06 Mar 2016	62	Disc.: LINEAR	MPC · JPL
1	2001 SY138	MBA-O	16.8	2.4 km	multiple	2001–2019	31 Dec 2019	58	Disc.: LINEAR	MPC · JPL
0	2001 SR165	MBA-M	18.26	660 m	multiple	2001–2021	18 Apr 2021	45	Disc.: LINEAR; Alt.: 2005 NS68	MPC · JPL
4	2001 SY169	APO	23.1	85 m	multiple	2001–2013	09 Mar 2013	492	Disc.: LINEAR; Alt.: 2013 ET	MPC · JPL
7	2001 SZ169	AMO	25.1	34 m	single	5 days	24 Sep 2001	21	Disc.: LINEAR	MPC · JPL
3	2001 SA170	AMO	22.8	98 m	single	34 days	24 Oct 2001	86	Disc.: LINEAR	MPC · JPL
7	2001 SB170	APO	22.6	110 m	single	23 days	13 Oct 2001	26	Disc.: LINEAR	MPC · JPL
0	2001 SC170	AMO	20.4	300 m	multiple	2001–2018	12 Oct 2018	354	Disc.: LINEAR; Alt.: 2018 HP1	MPC · JPL
3	2001 SR170	MBA-M	18.6	800 m	multiple	2001–2018	05 Nov 2018	35	Disc.: LINEAR	MPC · JPL
3	2001 SC171	MBA-M	18.2	960 m	multiple	2001–2018	29 Oct 2018	28	Disc.: LINEAR	MPC · JPL
1	2001 SM172	MBA-M	18.82	470 m	multiple	2001-2022	19 Dec 2022	54	Disc.: LINEAR; Alt.: 2005 OP35	MPC · JPL
3	2001 SN183	MBA-M	18.2	680 m	multiple	2001–2019	09 Jan 2019	24	Disc.: LINEAR; Alt.: 2018 XD17	MPC · JPL
2	2001 SD187	MBA-M	17.6	900 m	multiple	2001–2019	08 Jan 2019	45	Disc.: LINEAR; Alt.: 2015 BN121	MPC · JPL
3	2001 SP188	MBA-M	18.4	880 m	multiple	2001–2014	30 Sep 2014	22	Disc.: LINEAR	MPC · JPL
3	2001 SE189	MBA-M	17.7	860 m	multiple	2001–2018	29 Nov 2018	29	Disc.: LINEAR	MPC · JPL
1	2001 SL190	MBA-I	18.8	520 m	multiple	1994–2019	20 Dec 2019	36	Disc.: LINEAR; Alt.: 2015 PZ105	MPC · JPL
1	2001 SU193	MCA	20.0	300 m	multiple	2001–2014	18 Sep 2014	47	Disc.: LINEAR	MPC · JPL
1	2001 SF194	MBA-I	18.2	680 m	multiple	2001–2021	04 Jan 2021	118	Disc.: LINEAR	MPC · JPL
4	2001 SG195	MBA-I	18.8	520 m	multiple	2001–2016	05 Dec 2016	22	Disc.: LINEAR	MPC · JPL
1	2001 SZ195	MBA-M	18.2	960 m	multiple	2001–2020	03 Jan 2020	50	Disc.: LINEAR; Alt.: 2014 QB134	MPC · JPL
1	2001 SJ197	MBA-O	18.73	530 m	multiple	2001-2022	02 Dec 2022	47	Disc.: LINEAR; Alt.: 2022 SU85	MPC · JPL
0	2001 ST198	MBA-I	18.90	490 m	multiple	2001–2021	05 Jul 2021	52	Disc.: LINEAR	MPC · JPL
3	2001 SE199	MBA-M	18.2	680 m	multiple	2001–2019	04 Feb 2019	38	Disc.: LINEAR	MPC · JPL
2	2001 SC202	MBA-O	17.58	1.7 km	multiple	2001-2017	29 Sep 2017	45	Disc.: LINEAR; Alt.: 2017 QD60	MPC · JPL
1	2001 SW202	MBA-M	17.7	1.6 km	multiple	2001–2020	08 Dec 2020	68	Disc.: LINEAR; Alt.: 2006 UY386	MPC · JPL
4	2001 SQ204	MBA-O	18.2	1.3 km	multiple	2001–2017	26 Nov 2017	21	Disc.: LINEAR; Added on 19 October 2020	MPC · JPL
0	2001 SC207	MBA-I	18.8	520 m	multiple	2001–2020	24 Jan 2020	70	Disc.: LINEAR; Alt.: 2019 UG17	MPC · JPL
0	2001 SR208	MBA-M	17.8	820 m	multiple	2001–2019	27 Jan 2019	55	Disc.: LINEAR; Alt.: 2007 EZ162	MPC · JPL
2	2001 SJ209	MBA-M	17.7	1.6 km	multiple	1992–2019	29 Oct 2019	65	Disc.: LINEAR; Alt.: 2010 RF82, 2015 XL343	MPC · JPL
2	2001 SQ211	MBA-M	18.69	550 m	multiple	2001-2021	08 Jun 2021	29	Disc.: LINEAR	MPC · JPL
2	2001 SQ215	MCA	19.0	470 m	multiple	2001–2018	15 Sep 2018	46	Disc.: LINEAR	MPC · JPL
1	2001 SD216	MBA-M	18.3	920 m	multiple	2001–2018	10 Nov 2018	59	Disc.: LINEAR; Alt.: 2014 WA36	MPC · JPL
2	2001 SV216	MBA-I	18.3	650 m	multiple	2001–2019	06 Jul 2019	67	Disc.: LINEAR	MPC · JPL
1	2001 SN218	MBA-I	18.38	630 m	multiple	2001–2022	08 Jan 2022	69	Disc.: LINEAR; Alt.: 2005 UO499	MPC · JPL
1	2001 SC221	MBA-O	17.52	1.7 km	multiple	2001-2022	15 Dec 2022	54	Disc.: LINEAR; Alt.: 2022 RM75	MPC · JPL
0	2001 SN221	MBA-I	18.32	640 m	multiple	2001–2020	14 Feb 2020	156	Disc.: LINEAR	MPC · JPL
1	2001 ST223	MBA-M	18.08	720 m	multiple	2001–2021	05 Jul 2021	52	Disc.: LINEAR	MPC · JPL
1	2001 SB239	MBA-M	17.1	1.1 km	multiple	2001–2020	21 Apr 2020	44	Disc.: LINEAR	MPC · JPL
1	2001 SA252	MBA-M	17.7	1.2 km	multiple	2001–2018	04 Nov 2018	74	Disc.: LINEAR; Alt.: 2014 UW168	MPC · JPL
0	2001 SJ262	AMO	19.9	370 m	multiple	2001–2006	28 Sep 2006	115	Disc.: NEAT	MPC · JPL
1	2001 SO262	MCA	17.5	940 m	multiple	2001–2019	09 Feb 2019	45	Disc.: LINEAR; Alt.: 2019 AS18	MPC · JPL
0	2001 SO263	AMO	22.20	130 m	multiple	2001–2021	01 Nov 2021	77	Disc.: LINEAR	MPC · JPL
7	2001 SP263	APO	25.7	26 m	single	5 days	26 Sep 2001	14	Disc.: LINEAR	MPC · JPL
2	2001 SR263	AMO	20.3	310 m	multiple	2001–2018	10 Nov 2018	88	Disc.: NEAT	MPC · JPL
1	2001 SV263	MBA-I	18.4	620 m	multiple	2001–2016	06 Jul 2016	48	Disc.: LINEAR	MPC · JPL
1	2001 SL264	AMO	20.11	450 m	multiple	2001-2023	04 Dec 2023	55	Disc.: LINEAR	MPC · JPL
3	2001 ST269	MBA-M	19.2	430 m	multiple	2001–2005	06 Oct 2005	16	Disc.: Spacewatch	MPC · JPL
2	2001 SX269	AMO	21.7	160 m	multiple	2001–2019	29 Sep 2019	33	Disc.: LINEAR	MPC · JPL
2	2001 SY269	APO	21.5	180 m	multiple	2001–2004	31 Mar 2004	112	Disc.: LINEAR; Potentially hazardous object	MPC · JPL
0	2001 SZ269	APO	19.82	400 m	multiple	2001–2023	24 Feb 2023	150	Disc.: LINEAR; Potentially hazardous object	MPC · JPL
1	2001 SD270	AMO	22.14	190 m	multiple	2001-2023	25 Sep 2023	45	Disc.: LINEAR	MPC · JPL
8	2001 SE270	APO	25.1	34 m	single	2 days	27 Sep 2001	16	Disc.: LINEAR	MPC · JPL
1	2001 SH272	MCA	19.1	450 m	multiple	2001–2019	27 Oct 2019	57	Disc.: LINEAR	MPC · JPL
2	2001 SG275	MBA-M	18.4	880 m	multiple	2001–2018	10 Jul 2018	40	Disc.: Spacewatch; Alt.: 2014 RF26	MPC · JPL
0	2001 SJ275	MCA	18.5	590 m	multiple	2001–2024	18 Apr 2024	62	Disc.: Spacewatch	MPC · JPL
2	2001 SH276	APO	19.6	430 m	multiple	2001–2020	12 Oct 2020	286	Disc.: LINEAR	MPC · JPL
0	2001 SY283	MBA-I	19.32	410 m	multiple	2001-2019	08 Non 2019	36	Disc.: Spacewatch; 9ded on 9 March 2021	MPC · JPL
5	2001 SK284	MBA-I	19.0	470 m	multiple	2001–2019	05 Nov 2019	24	Disc.: LPL/Spacewatch II	MPC · JPL
1	2001 SL284	MBA-I	19.3	410 m	multiple	2001–2020	20 Oct 2020	60	Disc.: LPL/Spacewatch II; Alt.: 2005 UQ339	MPC · JPL
7	2001 SD286	APO	25.3	31 m	single	5 days	29 Sep 2001	18	Disc.: LINEAR	MPC · JPL
0	2001 SG_{286}	APO	21.0	220 m	multiple	2001–2020	14 Nov 2020	217	Disc.: LINEAR; Potentially hazardous object	MPC · JPL
0	2001 SS287	AMO	18.3	780 m	multiple	2001–2007	14 Jun 2007	82	Disc.: LINEAR	MPC · JPL
E	2001 SD291	TNO	8.2	76 km	single	86 days	12 Dec 2001	8	Disc.: Palomar Obs. LoUTNOs, cubewano (cold)	MPC · JPL
7	2001 SE291	TNO	7.2	121 km	multiple	2001–2003	20 Nov 2003	9	Disc.: Palomar Obs. LoUTNOs, cubewano (cold)	MPC · JPL
2	2001 SW293	MBA-M	18.9	700 m	multiple	2001–2018	13 Dec 2018	48	Disc.: LINEAR	MPC · JPL
1	2001 SO296	MBA-M	17.4	980 m	multiple	2001–2019	23 Apr 2019	38	Disc.: LINEAR; Alt.: 2015 DK221	MPC · JPL
0	2001 SC297	MBA-I	18.6	570 m	multiple	2001–2020	21 Jan 2020	66	Disc.: LINEAR	MPC · JPL
1	2001 SP297	MBA-I	18.5	590 m	multiple	2001–2020	16 Oct 2020	64	Disc.: LINEAR; Alt.: 2005 UV362	MPC · JPL
0	2001 SB298	MBA-I	18.21	680 m	multiple	2001–2021	07 Apr 2021	104	Disc.: LINEAR	MPC · JPL
0	2001 SF298	MBA-M	17.8	1.2 km	multiple	2001–2020	05 Jan 2020	83	Disc.: LINEAR; Alt.: 2010 VL32	MPC · JPL
1	2001 SO300	MBA-M	18.16	1.3 km	multiple	1992–2019	22 Oct 2019	51	Disc.: LINEAR; Alt.: 2010 LC77	MPC · JPL
2	2001 SH301	MBA-M	18.4	880 m	multiple	2001–2018	15 Oct 2018	59	Disc.: LINEAR; Alt.: 2014 WZ189	MPC · JPL
0	2001 SM301	MBA-O	16.7	2.5 km	multiple	2001–2020	19 Jan 2020	57	Disc.: LINEAR	MPC · JPL
1	2001 SM303	MBA-M	17.7	1.2 km	multiple	2001–2019	29 Nov 2019	71	Disc.: LINEAR; Alt.: 2014 SV135	MPC · JPL
1	2001 SB304	MCA	18.7	540 m	multiple	2001–2019	08 Nov 2019	47	Disc.: LINEAR; Alt.: 2008 UP56	MPC · JPL
2	2001 SQ304	MBA-M	18.1	1.3 km	multiple	2001–2019	20 Dec 2019	40	Disc.: LINEAR	MPC · JPL
1	2001 SZ307	MCA	19.7	340 m	multiple	2001–2017	30 Jul 2017	47	align=left	
1	2001 SE309	MBA-I	18.7	540 m	multiple	2001–2019	08 Nov 2019	50	Disc.: LINEAR	MPC · JPL
1	2001 SO309	MBA-I	18.1	710 m	multiple	2001–2019	20 Dec 2019	108	Disc.: LINEAR	MPC · JPL
–	2001 SK320	MBA-O	16.2	3.2 km	single	26 days	17 Oct 2001	13	Disc.: LINEAR	MPC · JPL
0	2001 SR321	MBA-O	17.67	1.6 km	multiple	1996–2021	30 Jun 2021	37	Disc.: Spacewatch; Alt.: 1996 VU13	MPC · JPL
2	2001 SA324	MBA-I	18.37	630 m	multiple	2001–2022	25 Jan 2022	53	Disc.: LINEAR	MPC · JPL
0	2001 SZ326	MBA-O	18.73	1.0 km	multiple	2001-2022	16 Nov 2022	49	Disc.: LPL/Spacewatch II	MPC · JPL
2	2001 SJ330	MBA-I	19.1	450 m	multiple	2001–2018	08 Aug 2018	29	Disc.: LINEAR	MPC · JPL
–	2001 SN330	MBA-M	17.9	1.1 km	single	5 days	24 Sep 2001	10	Disc.: LINEAR	MPC · JPL
E	2001 SS330	MBA-O	17.4	1.8 km	single	5 days	24 Sep 2001	14	Disc.: LINEAR	MPC · JPL
0	2001 SR331	MBA-M	18.31	920 m	multiple	2001–2021	11 Apr 2021	43	Disc.: Spacewatch	MPC · JPL
1	2001 SS332	MBA-I	18.6	570 m	multiple	2001–2020	17 Oct 2020	57	Disc.: Spacewatch	MPC · JPL
1	2001 SY333	MBA-O	17.91	1.5 km	multiple	2001–2017	17 Oct 2017	31	Disc.: LPL/Spacewatch II	MPC · JPL
2	2001 SY335	MBA-M	18.3	1.2 km	multiple	2001–2020	14 Nov 2020	44	Disc.: Spacewatch; Added on 17 January 2021	MPC · JPL
1	2001 SJ336	MBA-O	17.48	1.8 km	multiple	2001–2021	14 Jul 2021	40	Disc.: LINEAR	MPC · JPL
0	2001 SB337	MBA-I	19.17	440 m	multiple	2001–2021	09 Nov 2021	63	Disc.: LINEAR; Added on 5 November 2021; Alt.: 2011 SA157	MPC · JPL
1	2001 SJ337	MBA-I	19.43	390 m	multiple	2001–2021	08 Sep 2021	50	Disc.: LINEAR	MPC · JPL
3	2001 SO337	MBA-M	18.8	970 m	multiple	2001–2019	02 Nov 2019	69	Disc.: LPL/Spacewatch II; Added on 22 July 2020; Alt.: 2019 TL11	MPC · JPL
0	2001 SQ337	MCA	19.36	370 m	multiple	2001-2023	08 Nov 2023	59	Disc.: LPL/Spacewatch II	MPC · JPL
0	2001 SE338	MBA-I	18.82	510 m	multiple	2001–2021	24 Oct 2021	56	Disc.: LINEAR; Added on 30 September 2021; Alt.: 2021 OY18	MPC · JPL
0	2001 SF340	MCA	18.59	570 m	multiple	2001–2018	09 Nov 2018	52	Disc.: LONEOS	MPC · JPL
0	2001 SP340	MBA-I	18.6	570 m	multiple	2001–2016	08 Jun 2016	40	Disc.: LINEAR	MPC · JPL
1	2001 SA341	MBA-I	18.8	520 m	multiple	2001–2020	08 Dec 2020	54	Disc.: LINEAR	MPC · JPL
1	2001 SH343	MBA-M	19.3	580 m	multiple	2001–2019	06 Dec 2019	34	Disc.: Spacewatch	MPC · JPL
2	2001 SW343	MBA-M	17.9	1.1 km	multiple	2001–2018	02 Nov 2018	80	Disc.: Spacewatch	MPC · JPL
1	2001 SO347	MBA-M	18.06	730 m	multiple	2001–2021	29 Jul 2021	64	Disc.: LINEAR	MPC · JPL
1	2001 SC350	MBA-M	18.6	520 m	multiple	2001-2022	13 Nov 2022	69	Disc.: LINEAR	MPC · JPL
0	2001 SV351	MBA-M	17.8	820 m	multiple	2001–2020	25 May 2020	36	Disc.: SDSS	MPC · JPL
0	2001 SK354	MBA-O	17.51	1.8 km	multiple	2001-2022	24 Dec 2022	105	Disc.: NEAT; Alt.: 2022 QJ191	MPC · JPL
0	2001 SS355	MBA-M	18.89	700 m	multiple	2001–2019	02 Jan 2019	43	Disc.: NEAT	MPC · JPL
0	2001 SF356	MBA-M	18.0	1.1 km	multiple	2001–2020	03 Jan 2020	43	Disc.: NEAT	MPC · JPL
0	2001 SJ356	MBA-O	17.6	1.7 km	multiple	2001–2017	08 Dec 2017	23	Disc.: SDSS; Added on 22 July 2020	MPC · JPL
1	2001 SV356	MCA	17.9	780 m	multiple	2001–2018	10 Dec 2018	43	Disc.: NEAT; Alt.: 2005 MJ46	MPC · JPL
1	2001 SA357	MBA-M	17.5	940 m	multiple	2001–2014	26 Dec 2014	52	Disc.: LONEOS	MPC · JPL
1	2001 SA359	MBA-M	18.21	680 m	multiple	2001–2021	12 Aug 2021	49	Disc.: SDSS	MPC · JPL
0	2001 SM359	MBA-I	18.4	620 m	multiple	2001–2019	23 May 2019	34	Disc.: SDSS	MPC · JPL
0	2001 SW359	MBA-I	17.9	780 m	multiple	2001–2021	06 Jan 2021	79	Disc.: SDSS	MPC · JPL
1	2001 SY359	MBA-I	19.0	470 m	multiple	2001–2019	13 Jan 2019	30	Disc.: Spacewatch	MPC · JPL
0	2001 SZ359	MCA	19.1	450 m	multiple	2001–2017	26 Jun 2017	31	Disc.: Spacewatch	MPC · JPL
1	2001 SB360	MBA-I	18.9	490 m	multiple	2001–2019	17 Dec 2019	32	Disc.: Spacewatch	MPC · JPL
0	2001 SC360	MBA-M	18.1	1.0 km	multiple	2001–2019	31 Dec 2019	38	Disc.: SDSS	MPC · JPL
0	2001 SE360	MBA-I	18.4	620 m	multiple	2001–2020	14 Jul 2020	33	Disc.: NEAT	MPC · JPL
1	2001 SF360	MBA-M	18.3	920 m	multiple	2001–2018	18 Oct 2018	56	Disc.: LPL/Spacewatch II	MPC · JPL
2	2001 SX360	MBA-M	18.4	880 m	multiple	2001–2018	06 Oct 2018	58	Disc.: SDSS	MPC · JPL
1	2001 SS361	MBA-I	18.6	570 m	multiple	1994–2019	29 Oct 2019	60	Disc.: LPL/Spacewatch II	MPC · JPL
0	2001 SU361	MBA-M	17.83	1.5 km	multiple	2001–2019	23 Oct 2019	45	Disc.: LPL/Spacewatch II	MPC · JPL
0	2001 SE362	MBA-I	18.77	520 m	multiple	2001–2019	25 Sep 2019	48	Disc.: LPL/Spacewatch II	MPC · JPL
0	2001 SM362	MBA-O	17.2	2.0 km	multiple	2001–2018	09 Nov 2018	41	Disc.: SDSS	MPC · JPL
1	2001 SP362	MBA-M	18.4	880 m	multiple	2001–2019	26 Nov 2019	30	Disc.: SDSS	MPC · JPL
1	2001 SQ362	MBA-M	17.7	1.6 km	multiple	2001–2019	24 Aug 2019	29	Disc.: SDSS	MPC · JPL
1	2001 ST362 = (887165)	MBA-M	17.82	810 m	multiple	2001–2021	04 Aug 2021	40	Disc.: SDSS	MPC · JPL
0	2001 SA363	MBA-M	18.71	1.0 km	multiple	2001–2019	24 Sep 2019	66	Disc.: Spacewatch; Alt.: 2010 KS80	MPC · JPL
1	2001 SF363	MBA-I	18.8	520 m	multiple	2001–2019	19 Dec 2019	41	Disc.: NEAT	MPC · JPL
1	2001 SG363	MBA-I	19.0	470 m	multiple	2001–2019	25 Sep 2019	38	Disc.: Spacewatch	MPC · JPL
1	2001 SS363	MBA-M	18.8	970 m	multiple	2001–2019	22 Oct 2019	41	Disc.: SDSS	MPC · JPL
1	2001 ST363 = (887166)	MBA-M	18.5	1.1 km	multiple	2001–2021	16 Jan 2021	55	Disc.: Spacewatch	MPC · JPL
0	2001 SD364	MBA-M	18.2	960 m	multiple	2001–2020	22 Jan 2020	29	Disc.: SDSS	MPC · JPL
1	2001 SE364	MBA-O	17.3	1.9 km	multiple	2001–2017	26 Nov 2017	21	Disc.: SDSS	MPC · JPL
3	2001 SF364	MBA-I	19.2	430 m	single	61 days	21 Nov 2001	20	Disc.: SDSS; Added on 22 July 2020	MPC · JPL
0	2001 SN364	MBA-I	19.31	410 m	multiple	2001–2019	28 Sep 2019	29	Disc.: LPL/Spacewatch II; Added on 17 January 2021	MPC · JPL
0	2001 SR364	MBA-I	18.5	590 m	multiple	2000–2020	16 Sep 2020	48	Disc.: Spacewatch; Added on 9 March 2021	MPC · JPL
0	2001 ST364 = (887167)	MBA-I	18.6	570 m	multiple	2001–2020	10 Nov 2020	38	Disc.: LPL/Spacewatch II; Added on 11 May 2021; Alt.: 2019 JJ33	MPC · JPL
0	2001 SU364 = (887168)	MBA-M	18.3	1.2 km	multiple	2001–2021	17 Jan 2021	29	Disc.: SDSS; Added on 11 May 2021	MPC · JPL
1	2001 SX364	MBA-I	18.9	490 m	multiple	2001–2015	13 Sep 2015	16	Disc.: SDSS; Added on 21 August 2021	MPC · JPL
1	2001 SY364	MBA-I	19.7	340 m	multiple	2001–2019	05 Jul 2019	19	Disc.: Spacewatch; Added on 21 August 2021	MPC · JPL
1	2001 SD365	MBA-I	19.0	470 m	multiple	2001–2015	08 Sep 2015	12	Disc.: SDSS; Added on 29 January 2022	MPC · JPL

back to top
