= List of unnumbered minor planets: 2001 V–W =

This is a partial list of unnumbered minor planets for principal provisional designations assigned during 1–30 November 2001. As of March 2026, a total of 109 bodies remain unnumbered for this period. Objects for this year are listed on the following pages: A–E · F_{i} · F_{ii} · G–O · P–R · S · T · U · V–W and X–Y. Also see previous and next year.

Near-Earth obj.	MBA (inner)	MBA (outer)	Centaur
Mars-crosser	MBA (middle)	Jupiter trojan	Trans-Neptunian obj.
Unclassified

== V ==
U	Designation	Class	Physical		Observations				Description and notes	Ref
U	Designation	Class	H	D	Opp.	Arc	Last	Used	Description and notes	Ref
3	2001 VB	APO	18.4	740 m	single	8 days	11 Nov 2001	53	Disc.: LINEAR; Potentially hazardous object	MPC · JPL
0	2001 VC2	APO	21.30	200 m	multiple	2001–2021	01 Jun 2021	188	Disc.: LINEAR; Potentially hazardous object	MPC · JPL
7	2001 VD2	APO	25.6	27 m	single	3 days	11 Nov 2001	41	Disc.: LINEAR; AMO at MPC	MPC · JPL
6	2001 VE2	APO	25.0	36 m	single	7 days	16 Nov 2001	64	Disc.: LINEAR	MPC · JPL
1	2001 VF2	AMO	20.2	320 m	multiple	2001–2018	07 Sep 2018	100	Disc.: LINEAR	MPC · JPL
0	2001 VH5	AMO	21.18	210 m	multiple	2001–2021	09 May 2021	95	Disc.: NEAT	MPC · JPL
2	2001 VJ5	APO	22.0	140 m	multiple	2001–2018	11 Apr 2018	37	Disc.: LINEAR; Potentially hazardous object	MPC · JPL
7	2001 VM5	AMO	25.1	34 m	single	5 days	16 Nov 2001	13	Disc.: LINEAR	MPC · JPL
7	2001 VG16	APO	25.3	31 m	single	4 days	16 Nov 2001	22	Disc.: LINEAR	MPC · JPL
2	2001 VE27	MCA	18.4	620 m	multiple	2001–2012	22 Oct 2012	41	Disc.: LINEAR	MPC · JPL
0	2001 VE68	MCA	18.0	750 m	multiple	2001–2016	08 Dec 2016	52	Disc.: LINEAR	MPC · JPL
0	2001 VB70	MBA-O	16.7	2.5 km	multiple	2001–2017	25 Dec 2017	44	Disc.: LINEAR	MPC · JPL
3	2001 VN71	TNO	9.1	72 km	multiple	2001–2020	18 Feb 2020	24	Disc.: Mauna Kea Obs. LoUTNOs, plutino	MPC · JPL
0	2001 VL74	MBA-M	18.3	920 m	multiple	2001–2020	29 Jan 2020	30	Disc.: Spacewatch; Alt.: 2014 WM129	MPC · JPL
–	2001 VF75	APO	21.7	160 m	single	9 days	20 Nov 2001	28	Disc.: Spacewatch	MPC · JPL
1	2001 VJ75	AMO	19.9	370 m	multiple	2001–2014	19 Dec 2014	38	Disc.: LINEAR	MPC · JPL
–	2001 VK75	HUN	20.2	270 m	single	31 days	24 Nov 2001	17	Disc.: Spacewatch	MPC · JPL
2	2001 VC76	APO	19.7	410 m	multiple	2001–2015	19 Nov 2015	74	Disc.: LPL/Spacewatch II	MPC · JPL
8	2001 VE76	APO	23.6	68 m	single	6 days	21 Nov 2001	21	Disc.: LINEAR	MPC · JPL
3	2001 VV77	MBA-M	18.8	730 m	multiple	2001–2019	02 Jan 2019	32	Disc.: Spacewatch	MPC · JPL
0	2001 VR87	MBA-I	17.5	940 m	multiple	2001–2019	07 Jul 2019	75	Disc.: LINEAR; Alt.: 2012 VU3	MPC · JPL
0	2001 VT101	MBA-O	16.4	2.9 km	multiple	2001–2018	18 Jan 2018	36	Disc.: LINEAR	MPC · JPL
0	2001 VW101	MBA-I	18.9	490 m	multiple	2001–2020	22 Jan 2020	55	Disc.: LINEAR; Alt.: 2019 UJ24	MPC · JPL
0	2001 VN107	MBA-O	18.13	1.5 km	multiple	2001–2023	25 Jan 2023	50	Disc.: LINEAR	MPC · JPL
0	2001 VH121	HUN	18.9	490 m	multiple	2001–2021	05 Jan 2021	99	Disc.: LPL/Spacewatch II; Alt.: 2011 HG62	MPC · JPL
0	2001 VE123	MBA-O	17.9	1.5 km	multiple	2001–2018	11 Nov 2018	39	Disc.: Spacewatch; Alt.: 2018 RO11	MPC · JPL
0	2001 VY124	MBA-M	17.8	1.5 km	multiple	2001–2019	06 Dec 2019	38	Disc.: LINEAR; Alt.: 2014 QV14	MPC · JPL
0	2001 VB127	MBA-O	17.2	2.0 km	multiple	2001–2017	25 Oct 2017	30	Disc.: SDSS	MPC · JPL
0	2001 VN127	MBA-O	17.3	1.9 km	multiple	2001–2020	26 May 2020	30	Disc.: SDSS; Added on 22 July 2020	MPC · JPL
–	2001 VA129	MBA-M	18.2	680 m	single	10 days	21 Nov 2001	6	Disc.: SDSS	MPC · JPL
2	2001 VH130	MBA-O	18.39	1.2 km	multiple	2001–2021	13 Sep 2021	19	Disc.: SDSS; Added on 29 January 2022	MPC · JPL
2	2001 VQ130	MBA-M	17.6	1.7 km	multiple	2001–2019	29 Nov 2019	56	Disc.: SDSS; Alt.: 2010 OU29	MPC · JPL
0	2001 VO131	MBA-O	17.0	2.2 km	multiple	2001–2020	28 Jan 2020	26	Disc.: SDSS; Added on 21 August 2021	MPC · JPL
0	2001 VU131	MBA-O	17.69	1.6 km	multiple	2001–2020	21 Oct 2020	61	Disc.: SDSS; Added on 17 January 2021; Alt.: 2010 JM204	MPC · JPL
1	2001 VZ131	MBA-O	17.73	1.6 km	multiple	2001–2022	07 Jan 2022	26	Disc.: SDSS; Added on 30 September 2021	MPC · JPL
1	2001 VP133	MBA-M	17.9	1.1 km	multiple	2001–2019	03 Jan 2019	44	Disc.: SDSS; Alt.: 2018 VA79	MPC · JPL
2	2001 VQ133	MBA-M	19.2	430 m	multiple	2001–2017	16 Aug 2017	21	Disc.: SDSS	MPC · JPL
0	2001 VS133	MBA-M	18.47	800 m	multiple	2001-2022	24 Dec 2022	30	Disc.: SDSS	MPC · JPL
0	2001 VR135	MBA-M	18.06	730 m	multiple	2001–2021	17 Jun 2021	41	Disc.: SDSS	MPC · JPL
0	2001 VX135	MBA-I	18.2	680 m	multiple	2001–2021	06 Jan 2021	57	Disc.: SDSS	MPC · JPL
0	2001 VV135	MBA-O	17.9	1.5 km	multiple	2001–2017	17 Oct 2017	30	Disc.: SDSS	MPC · JPL
0	2001 VY135	MBA-O	17.7	1.6 km	multiple	2001–2018	15 Jan 2018	26	Disc.: SDSS	MPC · JPL
1	2001 VC136	MBA-I	18.4	620 m	multiple	2001–2019	30 Nov 2019	89	Disc.: LPL/Spacewatch II	MPC · JPL
0	2001 VQ136	MBA-M	18.2	960 m	multiple	2001–2019	07 Jan 2019	43	Disc.: SDSS	MPC · JPL
2	2001 VU136	MBA-M	18.8	970 m	multiple	2001–2019	02 Nov 2019	36	Disc.: SDSS	MPC · JPL
0	2001 VX136	MBA-M	18.23	1.3 km	multiple	2001–2021	11 Apr 2021	38	Disc.: SDSS	MPC · JPL
0	2001 VA137	MBA-M	18.7	760 m	multiple	2001–2018	13 Dec 2018	31	Disc.: SDSS	MPC · JPL
0	2001 VB137 = (887170)	MBA-I	19.34	400 m	multiple	2001–2021	07 Nov 2021	66	Disc.: Spacewatch	MPC · JPL
0	2001 VH137	MBA-M	17.7	1.2 km	multiple	2001–2019	28 Dec 2019	28	Disc.: SDSS	MPC · JPL
0	2001 VJ137	MBA-M	17.7	860 m	multiple	2001–2019	09 Jan 2019	28	Disc.: SDSS	MPC · JPL
0	2001 VK137	MBA-M	19.0	670 m	multiple	2001–2018	07 Nov 2018	22	Disc.: SDSS	MPC · JPL
0	2001 VE138	MBA-M	18.0	1.1 km	multiple	2001–2020	19 Jan 2020	26	Disc.: Spacewatch	MPC · JPL
0	2001 VF138	MBA-I	19.0	470 m	multiple	2001–2019	06 Oct 2019	24	Disc.: SDSS	MPC · JPL
0	2001 VG138	MBA-M	18.4	880 m	multiple	2001–2020	02 Feb 2020	28	Disc.: SDSS	MPC · JPL
0	2001 VJ138	MBA-M	18.44	870 m	multiple	2001-2021	07 Feb 2021	22	Disc.: SDSS; Added on 19 October 2020	MPC · JPL
1	2001 VK138	MBA-M	18.2	1.3 km	multiple	2001–2019	26 Nov 2019	26	Disc.: SDSS; Added on 19 October 2020	MPC · JPL
2	2001 VL138	MBA-I	19.4	390 m	multiple	2001–2019	20 Dec 2019	16	Disc.: SDSS; Added on 17 January 2021	MPC · JPL
0	2001 VO138	MBA-I	18.51	590 m	multiple	2001–2021	21 Apr 2021	42	Disc.: SDSS; Added on 9 March 2021	MPC · JPL
0	2001 VQ138	HUN	19.31	410 m	multiple	2001–2020	20 Dec 2020	24	Disc.: SDSS; Added on 11 May 2021	MPC · JPL
0	2001 VU138	MBA-I	18.97	480 m	multiple	2001–2022	12 Jan 2022	35	Disc.: SDSS; Added on 21 August 2021	MPC · JPL
0	2001 VW138	MBA-M	18.65	550 m	multiple	2001–2021	11 Sep 2021	64	Disc.: SDSS; Added on 30 September 2021	MPC · JPL
0	2001 VX138	HUN	19.2	430 m	multiple	2001–2021	13 Apr 2021	29	Disc.: Spacewatch; Added on 5 November 2021	MPC · JPL
0	2001 VA139	MBA-I	18.3	650 m	multiple	2001–2021	05 Jan 2021	30	Disc.: No observations Added on 29 January 2022	MPC · JPL

back to top

== W ==
U	Designation	Class	Physical		Observations				Description and notes	Ref
U	Designation	Class	H	D	Opp.	Arc	Last	Used	Description and notes	Ref
7	2001 WH1	APO	20.4	300 m	single	24 days	11 Dec 2001	99	Disc.: LINEAR	MPC · JPL
9	2001 WV1	APO	22.5	110 m	single	3 days	21 Nov 2001	51	Disc.: LINEAR	MPC · JPL
1	2001 WH2	AMO	20.1	340 m	multiple	2001–2005	09 Mar 2005	114	Disc.: LINEAR	MPC · JPL
6	2001 WJ4	APO	27.4	12 m	single	1 day	21 Nov 2001	26	Disc.: LPL/Spacewatch II	MPC · JPL
1	2001 WL4	MCA	18.2	680 m	multiple	2001–2019	02 May 2019	36	Disc.: LINEAR	MPC · JPL
0	2001 WN4	MCA	19.39	450 m	multiple	2001-2024	27 Nov 2024	65	Disc.: LONEOS	MPC · JPL
0	2001 WP4	MCA	19.37	400 m	multiple	2001–2020	24 Jan 2020	165	Disc.: NEAT; Alt.: 2001 TT103	MPC · JPL
2	2001 WQ4	MCA	18.9	920 m	multiple	2001–2020	09 Dec 2020	65	Disc.: LPL/Spacewatch II; Alt.: 2020 WW1	MPC · JPL
1	2001 WZ4	MBA-M	17.89	1.1 km	multiple	2001-2023	13 Apr 2023	55	Disc.: LINEAR	MPC · JPL
0	2001 WR5	AMO	22.8	98 m	multiple	2001–2016	14 Jan 2016	81	Disc.: LINEAR	MPC · JPL
0	2001 WB7	MBA-I	18.4	620 m	multiple	2001–2020	17 Oct 2020	78	Disc.: LINEAR; Alt.: 2020 QF43	MPC · JPL
3	2001 WJ15	APO	23.6	68 m	single	28 days	19 Dec 2001	24	Disc.: LINEAR	MPC · JPL
0	2001 WK15	APO	21.2	200 m	multiple	2001–2018	14 Dec 2018	57	Disc.: LINEAR	MPC · JPL
7	2001 WM15	APO	25.0	36 m	single	4 days	28 Nov 2001	35	Disc.: LINEAR	MPC · JPL
8	2001 WN15	APO	19.4	470 m	single	12 days	06 Dec 2001	27	Disc.: LINEAR	MPC · JPL
2	2001 WO15	APO	22.6	110 m	multiple	2001–2018	12 Dec 2018	112	Disc.: LINEAR	MPC · JPL
1	2001 WP15	AMO	21.4	190 m	multiple	2001–2006	31 Oct 2006	40	Disc.: NEATNEAT	MPC · JPL
0	2001 WV19	MBA-M	17.6	1.7 km	multiple	2001–2019	21 Oct 2019	123	Disc.: LINEAR; Alt.: 2010 NR54, 2010 TG167	MPC · JPL
0	2001 WD22	HUN	19.2	430 m	multiple	2001–2021	18 May 2021	34	Disc.: LINEAR; Added on 21 August 2021; Alt.: 2021 GV16	MPC · JPL
0	2001 WL22	MCA	20.30	260 m	multiple	2001–2021	28 Nov 2021	33	Disc.: Kitt Peak Obs.	MPC · JPL
1	2001 WT23	MBA-O	18.5	1.1 km	multiple	2001–2018	28 Nov 2018	17	Disc.: Spacewatch; Added on 24 December 2021	MPC · JPL
1	2001 WP43	MBA-M	18.27	930 m	multiple	2001–2019	05 Jan 2019	55	Disc.: LINEAR	MPC · JPL
0	2001 WU44	MCA	17.77	2.1 km	multiple	2001–2019	13 Feb 2019	319	Disc.: LINEAR	MPC · JPL
3	2001 WF49	ATE	22.1	140 m	multiple	2001–2018	03 Dec 2018	89	Disc.: LINEAR	MPC · JPL
8	2001 WH49	APO	26.0	22 m	single	1 day	25 Nov 2001	6	Disc.: LPL/Spacewatch II	MPC · JPL
0	2001 WT56	MBA-M	17.9	1.1 km	multiple	2001–2018	03 Dec 2018	52	Disc.: LINEAR	MPC · JPL
1	2001 WL74	MBA-M	18.9	700 m	multiple	2001–2019	04 Jan 2019	26	Disc.: LINEAR	MPC · JPL
2	2001 WE79	MBA-M	18.13	1.1 km	multiple	2001-2023	10 Feb 2023	35	Disc.: LINEAR	MPC · JPL
0	2001 WB82	MBA-O	17.23	2 km	multiple	2001-2022	19 Dec 2022	67	Disc.: LINEAR; Alt.: 2022 RE72	MPC · JPL
0	2001 WV83	MBA-I	18.7	540 m	multiple	2001–2020	22 Apr 2020	45	Disc.: LINEAR	MPC · JPL
0	2001 WJ84	MBA-M	17.93	770 m	multiple	2001–2021	05 Aug 2021	38	Disc.: LINEAR; Added on 22 July 2020	MPC · JPL
1	2001 WZ84	MBA-M	18.23	670 m	multiple	2001–2021	03 Aug 2021	61	Disc.: LINEAR; Alt.: 2005 VO78	MPC · JPL
0	2001 WJ86	MBA-O	16.9	2.3 km	multiple	2001–2020	15 May 2020	38	Disc.: LINEAR; Alt.: 2006 SZ291	MPC · JPL
0	2001 WP88	MBA-O	17.76	1.8 km	multiple	2001-2022	26 Dec 2022	73	Disc.: LINEAR	MPC · JPL
1	2001 WM90	MBA-M	18.1	710 m	multiple	2001–2019	08 Feb 2019	51	Disc.: LINEAR; Alt.: 2005 UQ192	MPC · JPL
2	2001 WT95	MBA-O	17.9	1.5 km	multiple	2001–2017	22 Sep 2017	30	Disc.: Spacewatch	MPC · JPL
0	2001 WP96	MBA-M	18.7	760 m	multiple	2001–2014	29 Dec 2014	25	Disc.: Spacewatch; Alt.: 2014 WF483	MPC · JPL
0	2001 WT98	HUN	18.7	540 m	multiple	2001–2020	07 Dec 2020	43	Disc.: LINEAR	MPC · JPL
0	2001 WP105	MBA-M	17.5	940 m	multiple	2001–2019	08 Apr 2019	32	Disc.: SDSS	MPC · JPL
0	2001 WR105	MBA-M	17.1	1.6 km	multiple	2001–2019	24 Apr 2019	33	Disc.: SDSS	MPC · JPL
0	2001 WK106	MBA-I	18.8	520 m	multiple	2001–2017	28 Sep 2017	41	Disc.: Spacewatch	MPC · JPL
0	2001 WN106	MBA-I	18.9	490 m	multiple	2001–2019	08 Nov 2019	39	Disc.: Spacewatch	MPC · JPL
0	2001 WQ106	MBA-I	18.8	520 m	multiple	2001–2020	19 Jan 2020	40	Disc.: Spacewatch	MPC · JPL
0	2001 WR106	MBA-I	18.88	500 m	multiple	2001–2021	31 Aug 2021	43	Disc.: LPL/Spacewatch II	MPC · JPL
0	2001 WS106	MBA-I	18.7	540 m	multiple	2001–2019	04 Dec 2019	30	Disc.: LPL/Spacewatch II	MPC · JPL
0	2001 WU106	MBA-I	18.5	590 m	multiple	2001–2019	01 Nov 2019	32	Disc.: SDSS	MPC · JPL
0	2001 WD107	MBA-M	18.8	730 m	multiple	2001–2018	06 Oct 2018	39	Disc.: LPL/Spacewatch II	MPC · JPL

back to top
