= Astrovirtel =

Data archive

Astrovirtel (Accessing Astronomical Archives as Virtual Telescopes, obs. code: I03) is a data archive used as virtual astronomical observatory. The project was funded from 2000 until 2003 and supported by the European Commission's Access to Research Infrastructures action of the Improving Human Potential Programme and managed by the Space Telescope European Coordinating Facility (ST-ECF) on behalf of European Space Agency and European Southern Observatory (ESO).

Its aim was to enhance the scientific return of the ST-ECF/ESO Archive, allowing European users to exploit the archive as a virtual telescope, retrieving and analyzing large quantities of data with the assistance of the archive operators and personnel. The Astrovirtel Selection Panel selected up to six proposals per year.

Astrovirtel was an initial step towards a proper virtual observatory, such as the European Virtual Observatory.
