= List of unnumbered trans-Neptunian objects: 2001 =

The following is a partial list of unnumbered trans-Neptunian objects for principal designations assigned within 2001. As of October 2026, it contains a total of 90 bodies. For more information see the description on the main page. Also see list for the previous and next year.

== 2001 ==
Designation	First Observed (discovered)		D (km)	Orbital description						Remarks	Refs
Designation	Date	Observer (Site)	D (km)	Class	a (AU)	e	i (°)	q (AU)	Q (AU)	Remarks	Refs
2001 DB_{106}	28 February 2001	O. R. Hainaut, A. C. Delsanti (809)	153	cubewano (cold)	43.2	0.04	4	41.7	44.7	albedo: 0.152	MPC · JPL
2001 DC_{106}	28 February 2001	O. R. Hainaut, A. C. Delsanti (809)	172	cubewano (cold)	42.3	0.06	2	39.6	45.0	albedo: 0.152	MPC · JPL
2001 DD_{106}	28 February 2001	O. R. Hainaut, A. C. Delsanti (809)	96	cubewano (cold)	44.1	0.10	2	39.8	48.3	albedo: 0.152	MPC · JPL
2001 DM_{108}	22 February 2001	Maunakea (568)	118	cubewano (cold)?	45.4	0.00	3	45.4	45.4	albedo: 0.152	MPC · JPL
2001 DN_{108}	22 February 2001	Maunakea (568)	130	cubewano (hot)?	45.5	0.00	8	45.5	45.5	albedo: 0.079	MPC · JPL
2001 DO_{108}	22 February 2001	Maunakea (568)	71	cubewano (cold)?	43.0	0.00	3	43.0	43.0	albedo: 0.152	MPC · JPL
2001 DP_{108}	22 February 2001	Maunakea (568)	49	plutino?	39.5	0.31	1	27.4	51.6	albedo: 0.074	MPC · JPL
2001 DQ_{108}	22 February 2001	Maunakea (568)	65	cubewano (cold)?	45.4	0.00	3	45.4	45.4	albedo: 0.152	MPC · JPL
2001 DR_{106}	22 February 2001	Maunakea (568)	75	cubewano (cold)?	44.5	0.00	2	44.5	44.5	albedo: 0.152	MPC · JPL
2001 DS_{106}	22 February 2001	D. Kinoshita, J. Watanabe, T. Fuse (568)	101	cubewano (hot)?	43.7	0.12	6	38.4	48.9	albedo: 0.079	MPC · JPL
2001 DS_{108}	22 February 2001	Maunakea (568)	86	cubewano (cold)?	45.9	0.00	3	45.9	45.9	albedo: 0.152	MPC · JPL
2001 DT_{108}	25 February 2001	Maunakea (568)	62	plutino?	39.5	0.19	2	32.1	46.9	albedo: 0.074	MPC · JPL
2001 DU_{108}	22 February 2001	Maunakea (568)	68	cubewano (cold)?	45.0	0.05	3	42.8	47.2	albedo: 0.152	MPC · JPL
2001 DV_{108}	22 February 2001	D. Kinoshita, J. Watanabe, T. Fuse (568)	84	other TNO	46.0	0.26	5	33.9	58.2	albedo: 0.13	MPC · JPL
2001 ES_{24}	1 March 2001	O. R. Hainaut, A. C. Delsanti (809)	119	cubewano (cold)	44.4	0.06	4	41.9	46.9	albedo: 0.152	MPC · JPL
2001 FB_{185}	27 March 2001	Kitt Peak (695)	28	cubewano (cold)?	43.2	0.09	4	39.4	46.9	albedo: 0.152	MPC · JPL
2001 FC_{185}	27 March 2001	Kitt Peak (695)	113	cubewano (hot)?	42.9	0.10	20	38.6	47.3	albedo: 0.079	MPC · JPL
2001 FC_{193}	27 March 2001	Kitt Peak (695)	65	cubewano (cold)?	46.5	0.00	3	46.5	46.5	albedo: 0.152	MPC · JPL
2001 FD_{193}	27 March 2001	Kitt Peak (695)	113	cubewano (hot)?	44.8	0.00	13	44.8	44.8	albedo: 0.079	MPC · JPL
2001 FF_{193}	27 March 2001	Kitt Peak (695)	98	cubewano (cold)?	44.7	0.00	2	44.7	44.7	albedo: 0.152	MPC · JPL
2001 FJ_{193}	27 March 2001	Kitt Peak (695)	67	plutino?	39.3	0.08	1	36.2	42.5	albedo: 0.074	MPC · JPL
2001 FJ_{194}	22 March 2001	Kitt Peak (695)	157	cubewano (hot)?	44.1	0.14	12	38.0	50.3	albedo: 0.079	MPC · JPL
2001 FK_{194}	22 March 2001	Kitt Peak (695)	92	centaur	76.3	0.63	9	28.0	124.6	albedo: 0.058	MPC · JPL
2001 FL_{185}	26 March 2001	M. W. Buie (695)	130	cubewano (cold)	44.2	0.08	4	40.7	47.6	binary]]: 68 km; albedo: 0.152	MPC · JPL
2001 FM_{194}	22 March 2001	Kitt Peak (695)	125	SDO	53.9	0.36	29	34.3	73.5	albedo: 0.124; BRmag: 1.19; taxonomy: BR	MPC · JPL
2001 FN_{194}	22 March 2001	Kitt Peak (695)	91	other TNO	39.3	0.15	9	33.4	45.2	albedo: 0.13	MPC · JPL
2001 FS_{185}	26 March 2001	Kitt Peak (695)	98	cubewano (cold)?	43.3	0.04	5	41.4	45.1	albedo: 0.152	MPC · JPL
2001 FT_{185}	26 March 2001	M. W. Buie (695)	124	cubewano (hot)?	47.1	0.11	20	41.9	52.4	albedo: 0.079	MPC · JPL
2001 FU_{172}	22 March 2001	B. Gladman (695)	102	plutino	39.2	0.27	25	28.7	49.8	albedo: 0.074; BRmag: 3.57	MPC · JPL
2001 FV_{185}	26 March 2001	M. W. Buie (695)	—	—	47.1	0.11	4	42.1	52.1	—	MPC · JPL
2001 HA_{59}	26 April 2001	O. R. Hainaut, A. C. Delsanti (809)	160	cubewano (cold)	43.8	0.07	1	40.9	46.6	albedo: 0.152	MPC · JPL
2001 KA_{77}	24 May 2001	M. W. Buie (807)	634	cubewano (hot)	47.2	0.09	12	42.8	51.6	albedo: 0.025; BRmag: 1.72; taxonomy: RR	MPC · JPL
2001 KE_{77}	24 May 2001	M. W. Buie (807)	172	cubewano (hot)?	45.3	0.18	21	36.9	53.6	albedo: 0.079	MPC · JPL
2001 KF_{76}	22 May 2001	M. W. Buie (807)	124	cubewano (cold)	44.2	0.02	3	43.2	45.2	albedo: 0.152	MPC · JPL
2001 KG_{76}	22 May 2001	M. W. Buie (807)	215	res · 4:9	51.4	0.34	2	33.8	69.0	albedo: 0.126; BRmag: 1.92	MPC · JPL
2001 KG_{77}	23 May 2001	M. W. Buie (807)	91	SDO	61.3	0.45	16	33.9	88.6	albedo: 0.124; BRmag: 1.24	MPC · JPL
2001 KH_{76}	22 May 2001	M. W. Buie (807)	149	cubewano (cold)	46.0	0.12	3	40.4	51.5	albedo: 0.152	MPC · JPL
2001 KL_{76}	22 May 2001	M. W. Buie (807)	179	res · 5:9	44.3	0.10	1	39.9	48.7	albedo: 0.126	MPC · JPL
2001 KM_{76}	22 May 2001	Cerro Tololo Observatory, La Serena (807)	130	cubewano (cold)?	44.9	0.08	1	41.5	48.2	albedo: 0.152	MPC · JPL
2001 KO_{77}	23 May 2001	M. W. Buie (807)	147	cubewano (hot)?	43.7	0.14	21	37.5	49.9	albedo: 0.079	MPC · JPL
2001 KQ_{76}	24 May 2001	M. W. Buie (807)	260	cubewano (hot)	42.6	0.10	6	38.6	46.7	albedo: 0.079	MPC · JPL
2001 KS_{76}	24 May 2001	Cerro Tololo Observatory, La Serena (807)	108	cubewano (cold)?	43.6	0.09	3	39.6	47.7	albedo: 0.152	MPC · JPL
2001 KW_{76}	22 May 2001	M. W. Buie (807)	143	cubewano (hot)?	45.8	0.21	11	36.1	55.5	albedo: 0.079	MPC · JPL
2001 KY_{76}	22 May 2001	M. W. Buie (807)	272	plutino	39.2	0.23	4	30.0	48.3	albedo: 0.074; BRmag: 1.84	MPC · JPL
2001 KZ_{76}	24 May 2001	Cerro Tololo Observatory, La Serena (807)	104	SDO	79.0	0.52	26	38.2	119.8	albedo: 0.124	MPC · JPL
2001 OG_{109}	27 July 2001	R. L. Allen, G. Bernstein, R. Malhotra (568)	82	cubewano (cold)	43.4	0.01	1	42.9	43.9	albedo: 0.152	MPC · JPL
2001 OJ_{108}	24 July 2001	Maunakea (568)	130	cubewano (hot)?	44.9	0.09	9	40.8	49.0	albedo: 0.079	MPC · JPL
2001 OK_{108}	24 July 2001	B. Gladman (568)	110	cubewano (cold)	42.8	0.03	2	41.4	44.3	albedo: 0.152	MPC · JPL
2001 OL_{108}	24 July 2001	Maunakea (568)	71	cubewano (cold)?	45.6	0.11	3	40.7	50.5	albedo: 0.152	MPC · JPL
2001 OM_{108}	25 July 2001	Maunakea (568)	119	cubewano (hot)?	46.1	0.04	12	44.3	47.8	albedo: 0.079	MPC · JPL
2001 OM_{109}	26 July 2001	J.-M. Petit, J. J. Kavelaars, M. J. Holman, B. Gladman (568)	99	SDO	68.2	0.49	4	34.6	101.7	albedo: 0.124	MPC · JPL
2001 ON_{108}	25 July 2001	B. Gladman (568)	96	cubewano (cold)	42.6	0.04	1	40.9	44.4	albedo: 0.152	MPC · JPL
2001 OO_{108}	27 July 2001	B. Gladman (568)	99	SDO	51.2	0.33	1	34.5	67.9	albedo: 0.124	MPC · JPL
2001 OQ_{108}	24 July 2001	B. Gladman (568)	159	cubewano (cold)	45.4	0.01	2	44.8	46.0	albedo: 0.152	MPC · JPL
2001 OR_{108}	24 July 2001	Maunakea (568)	90	cubewano (cold)?	45.7	0.10	3	41.2	50.1	albedo: 0.152	MPC · JPL
2001 OS_{108}	25 July 2001	Maunakea (568)	149	cubewano (cold)?	46.5	0.00	2	46.5	46.5	albedo: 0.152	MPC · JPL
2001 OT_{108}	25 July 2001	Maunakea (568)	55	SDO	67.0	0.52	1	32.4	101.5	albedo: 0.124	MPC · JPL
2001 OU_{108}	27 July 2001	Maunakea (568)	237	cubewano (hot)?	46.8	0.00	28	46.8	46.8	albedo: 0.079	MPC · JPL
2001 OY_{108}	24 July 2001	Maunakea (568)	157	cubewano (hot)?	46.1	0.10	7	41.5	50.6	albedo: 0.079	MPC · JPL
2001 OZ_{108}	24 July 2001	B. Gladman (568)	75	cubewano (cold)	43.2	0.05	2	40.9	45.6	albedo: 0.152	MPC · JPL
2001 PK_{47}	12 August 2001	C. Veillet (568)	162	cubewano (hot)	40.0	0.07	9	37.2	42.7	albedo: 0.079	MPC · JPL
2001 QA_{298}	19 August 2001	M. W. Buie (807)	160	cubewano (hot)?	46.2	0.19	24	37.5	54.8	albedo: 0.079	MPC · JPL
2001 QQ_{297}	19 August 2001	M. W. Buie (807)	143	cubewano (cold)	44.4	0.08	4	40.9	48.0	albedo: 0.152	MPC · JPL
2001 QS_{297}	20 August 2001	M. W. Buie (807)	393	cubewano (hot)?	39.3	0.13	6	34.1	44.6	albedo: 0.079	MPC · JPL
2001 QU_{297}	20 August 2001	Cerro Tololo Observatory, La Serena (807)	215	cubewano (cold)?	43.7	0.00	3	43.7	43.7	albedo: 0.152	MPC · JPL
2001 QV_{297}	20 August 2001	Cerro Tololo Observatory, La Serena (807)	187	cubewano (cold)?	44.0	0.00	2	44.0	44.0	albedo: 0.152	MPC · JPL
2001 QW322	24 August 2001	Maunakea (568)	128	cubewano (cold)	43.9	0.02	5	42.9	45.0	binary: 126 km; albedo: 0.093	MPC · JPL
2001 QX_{297}	20 August 2001	M. W. Buie (807)	186	cubewano (cold)	44.1	0.03	1	42.9	45.4	albedo: 0.152	MPC · JPL
2001 QZ_{297}	19 August 2001	M. W. Buie (807)	150	cubewano (cold)	44.2	0.06	2	41.5	46.9	albedo: 0.152	MPC · JPL
2001 RL_{155}	12 September 2001	Kitt Peak (695)	94	cubewano (cold)?	44.2	0.12	1	38.7	49.7	albedo: 0.152	MPC · JPL
2001 RW_{143}	12 September 2001	M. W. Buie (695)	136	cubewano (cold)	43.2	0.04	3	41.7	44.7	albedo: 0.152	MPC · JPL
2001 RY_{143}	12 September 2001	M. W. Buie (695)	183	cubewano (hot)?	42.2	0.15	7	35.8	48.6	albedo: 0.079	MPC · JPL
2001 SD_{291}	18 September 2001	Palomar Mountain (675)	78	cubewano (cold)	45.8	0.09	3	41.6	50.0	albedo: 0.152	MPC · JPL
2001 SE_{291}	18 September 2001	P. Nicholson, C. Dumas, A. W. Harris, B. Gladman (675)	124	cubewano (cold)	45.5	0.13	2	39.6	51.3	albedo: 0.152	MPC · JPL
2001 UA_{17}	17 October 2001	O. R. Hainaut, D. Kinoshita (809)	182	cubewano (hot)?	43.3	0.10	5	39.0	47.6	albedo: 0.079	MPC · JPL
2001 UB_{17}	17 October 2001	European Southern Observatory, La Silla (809)	123	plutino?	39.6	0.07	5	37.0	42.3	albedo: 0.074	MPC · JPL
2001 UC_{17}	17 October 2001	European Southern Observatory, La Silla (809)	148	plutino?	39.6	0.15	3	33.8	45.4	albedo: 0.074	MPC · JPL
2001 UN_{18}	19 October 2001	M. W. Buie (695)	171	cubewano (cold)	44.4	0.07	4	41.3	47.5	albedo: 0.152	MPC · JPL
2001 UP_{18}	19 October 2001	M. W. Buie (695)	238	twotino	47.9	0.07	1	44.4	51.4	albedo: 0.126; BRmag: 1.49; taxonomy: IR	MPC · JPL
2001 VN_{71}	9 November 2001	B. Gladman, J. J. Kavelaars (568)	91	plutino	39.8	0.25	19	29.8	49.8	albedo: 0.074	MPC · JPL
2001 XB_{255}	9 December 2001	S. S. Sheppard, D. C. Jewitt, J. Kleyna (568)	173	SDO	76.6	0.46	2	41.3	111.9	albedo: 0.124	MPC · JPL
2001 XC_{255}	9 December 2001	Maunakea (568)	113	cubewano (cold)?	43.8	0.05	2	41.7	45.9	albedo: 0.152	MPC · JPL
2001 XE_{255}	9 December 2001	Maunakea (568)	124	cubewano (hot)?	43.5	0.00	10	43.5	43.5	albedo: 0.079	MPC · JPL
2001 XF_{255}	9 December 2001	Maunakea (568)	98	cubewano (cold)?	44.0	0.00	1	44.0	44.0	albedo: 0.152	MPC · JPL
2001 XG_{255}	9 December 2001	Maunakea (568)	75	cubewano (cold)?	43.9	0.07	2	41.0	46.9	albedo: 0.152	MPC · JPL
2001 XJ_{255}	11 December 2001	J. Kleyna, S. S. Sheppard, D. C. Jewitt (568)	114	other TNO	37.7	0.11	11	33.5	41.9	albedo: 0.13	MPC · JPL
2001 XU_{254}	9 December 2001	S. S. Sheppard, J. Kleyna, D. C. Jewitt (568)	217	cubewano (hot)	43.7	0.08	7	40.1	47.2	albedo: 0.079	MPC · JPL
2001 XV_{254}	9 December 2001	J. Kleyna, D. C. Jewitt, S. S. Sheppard (568)	188	cubewano (hot)?	43.7	0.16	6	36.6	50.7	albedo: 0.079	MPC · JPL
2001 XW_{254}	10 December 2001	Maunakea (568)	136	cubewano (hot)?	42.3	0.00	6	42.3	42.3	albedo: 0.079	MPC · JPL
2001 XX_{254}	11 December 2001	J. Kleyna, D. C. Jewitt, S. S. Sheppard (568)	115	cubewano (cold)	44.0	0.03	2	42.7	45.4	albedo: 0.152	MPC · JPL

back to top
