= List of unnumbered minor planets: 1997 =

This is a partial list of unnumbered minor planets for principal provisional designations assigned between 1 January and 31 December 1997. As of May 2026, a total of 73 bodies remain unnumbered for this period. Also see previous and next year.

Near-Earth obj.	MBA (inner)	MBA (outer)	Centaur
Mars-crosser	MBA (middle)	Jupiter trojan	Trans-Neptunian obj.
Unclassified

== A ==
U	Designation	Class	Physical		Observations				Description and notes	Ref
U	Designation	Class	H	D	Opp.	Arc	Last	Used	Description and notes	Ref
0	1997 AC11	ATE	20.67	280 m	multiple	1997–2024	18 Dec 2024	173	Disc.: NEAT/GEODSS	MPC · JPL
0	1997 AB15	MCA	17.65	820 m	multiple	1997–2025	13 Jun 2025	484	Disc.: NEAT/GEODSS	MPC · JPL
0	1997 AD23	MBA-O	17.73	1.5 km	multiple	1997-2025	27 Aug 2025	42	Disc.: Mauna Kea Obs. Alt.: 2018 BZ50	MPC · JPL
E	1997 AT24	MBA-O	16.0	3.5 km	single	5 days	10 Jan 1997	6	Disc.: Cerro Tololo	MPC · JPL
E	1997 AU24	MBA-O	13.5	11 km	single	5 days	10 Jan 1997	6	Disc.: Cerro Tololo	MPC · JPL

back to top

== C ==
U	Designation	Class	Physical		Observations				Description and notes	Ref
U	Designation	Class	H	D	Opp.	Arc	Last	Used	Description and notes	Ref
6	1997 CD17	APO	27.5	11 m	single	2 days	11 Feb 1997	21	Disc.: Spacewatch	MPC · JPL
E	1997 CW29	TNO	6.5	237 km	single	27 days	07 Mar 1997	11	Disc.: Mauna Kea Obs. LoUTNOs, plutino?	MPC · JPL

back to top

== E ==
U	Designation	Class	Physical		Observations				Description and notes	Ref
U	Designation	Class	H	D	Opp.	Arc	Last	Used	Description and notes	Ref
1	1997 EF10	MBA-M	19.83	370 m	multiple	1997-2019	09 Apar 2019	36	Disc.: Spacewatch; Alt.: 2010 GX48, 2019 GG150	MPC · JPL
1	1997 ER12	MBA-I	18.6	570 m	multiple	1997–2020	24 Jun 2020	43	Disc.: Spacewatch; Added on 22 July 2020; Alt.: 2020 JO11	MPC · JPL
0	1997 EL15	MBA-M	18.54	880 m	multiple	1997–2024	01 Sep 2024	34	Disc.: Spacewatch	MPC · JPL
6	1997 EN23	AMO	22.8	98 m	single	21 days	29 Mar 1997	17	Disc.: Spacewatch	MPC · JPL

back to top

== G ==
U	Designation	Class	Physical		Observations				Description and notes	Ref
U	Designation	Class	H	D	Opp.	Arc	Last	Used	Description and notes	Ref
1	1997 GB2	MBA-O	18.7	1.0 km	multiple	1997–2023	18 Mar 2023	99	Disc.: Spacewatch	MPC · JPL
0	1997 GF3	MBA-O	17.16	2.0 km	multiple	1997–2024	09 Jun 2024	139	Disc.: NEAT/GEODSS	MPC · JPL
2	1997 GK3	APO	22.8	98 m	multiple	1997–2014	02 May 2014	64	Disc.: Spacewatch; AMO at MPC	MPC · JPL
0	1997 GQ25	MCA	18.36	630 m	multiple	1997–2021	30 Apr 2021	43	Disc.: Spacewatch; Alt.: 2009 FQ29	MPC · JPL
0	1997 GX27	MCA	18.32	750 m	multiple	1997–2023	14 Oct 2023	83	Disc.: Whipple Obs.	MPC · JPL
6	1997 GD32	APO	21.5	180 m	single	22 days	06 May 1997	90	Disc.: Spacewatch; Potentially hazardous object	MPC · JPL
2	1997 GA45	TNO	8.6	98 km	multiple	1997–2017	24 Jun 2017	38	Disc.: Mauna Kea Obs. LoUTNOs, cubewano (hot); Alt.: 2001 FH193	MPC · JPL

back to top

== H ==
U	Designation	Class	Physical		Observations				Description and notes	Ref
U	Designation	Class	H	D	Opp.	Arc	Last	Used	Description and notes	Ref
1	1997 HB4	MBA-M	18.15	960 m	multiple	1997–2023	19 Jun 2023	35	Disc.: Spacewatch; Alt.: 2010 HY81	MPC · JPL

back to top

== J ==
U	Designation	Class	Physical		Observations				Description and notes	Ref
U	Designation	Class	H	D	Opp.	Arc	Last	Used	Description and notes	Ref
0	1997 JS3	MBA-O	17.42	1.8 km	multiple	1997–2021	28 Nov 2021	54	Disc.: Mauna Kea Obs. Alt.: 2010 RA100	MPC · JPL

back to top

== M ==
U	Designation	Class	Physical		Observations				Description and notes	Ref
U	Designation	Class	H	D	Opp.	Arc	Last	Used	Description and notes	Ref
1	1997 MS	APO	19.41	480 m	multiple	1997-2024	10 May 2024	55	Disc.: LINEAR	MPC · JPL
1	1997 MD10	CEN	16.0	4.0 km	single	137 days	13 Nov 1997	115	Disc.: LINEAR; MCA at MPC	MPC · JPL

back to top

== N ==
U	Designation	Class	Physical		Observations				Description and notes	Ref
U	Designation	Class	H	D	Opp.	Arc	Last	Used	Description and notes	Ref
2	1997 NN4	MCA	21.41	160 m	multiple	1997–2016	30 Aug 2016	37	Disc.: Spacewatch	MPC · JPL
0	1997 NR5	MBA-I	19.0	470 m	multiple	1997–2020	27 Apr 2020	30	Disc.: Spacewatch	MPC · JPL
0	1997 NP9	MBA-I	19.61	360 m	multiple	1997–2021	13 Oct 2021	35	Disc.: Spacewatch; Added on 5 November 2021; Alt.: 2014 OG7	MPC · JPL
0	1997 NP10	MCA	20.36	250 m	multiple	1997–2021	14 Nov 2021	98	Disc.: Spacewatch; Alt.: 2021 RZ101	MPC · JPL

back to top

== O ==
U	Designation	Class	Physical		Observations				Description and notes	Ref
U	Designation	Class	H	D	Opp.	Arc	Last	Used	Description and notes	Ref
1	1997 OH	MCA	19.68	470 m	multiple	1997-2026	10 Jul 2026	53	Disc.: ODAS	MPC · JPL

back to top

== P ==
U	Designation	Class	Physical		Observations				Description and notes	Ref
U	Designation	Class	H	D	Opp.	Arc	Last	Used	Description and notes	Ref
2	1997 PN	AMO	19.7	410 m	multiple	1997–2007	16 Aug 2007	127	Disc.: NEAT/GEODSS	MPC · JPL

back to top

== Q ==
U	Designation	Class	Physical		Observations				Description and notes	Ref
U	Designation	Class	H	D	Opp.	Arc	Last	Used	Description and notes	Ref
0	1997 QK1	APO	20.25	340 m	multiple	1997–2025	15 Oct 2025	639	Disc.: Mauna Kea Obs. Potentially hazardous object	MPC · JPL
2	1997 QH4	TNO	7.0	204 km	multiple	1997–2014	27 Sep 2014	30	Disc.: Mauna Kea Obs. LoUTNOs, cubewano (hot), BR-mag: 1.68; taxonomy: RR	MPC · JPL

back to top

== R ==
U	Designation	Class	Physical		Observations				Description and notes	Ref
U	Designation	Class	H	D	Opp.	Arc	Last	Used	Description and notes	Ref
0	1997 RT	AMO	19.96	390 m	multiple	1997–2024	30 Sep 2024	312	Disc.: Ondřejov Obs.	MPC · JPL
E	1997 RY6	TNO	7.5	162 km	single	52 days	29 Oct 1997	20	Disc.: La Palma Obs. LoUTNOs, cubewano (hot)	MPC · JPL
5	1997 RX9	TNO	8.3	91 km	multiple	1997–2000	08 Aug 2000	22	Disc.: Palomar Obs. LoUTNOs, other TNO	MPC · JPL
0	1997 RC12	MBA-M	18.3	920 m	multiple	1997–2019	02 Oct 2019	43	Disc.: ODAS; Added on 22 July 2020	MPC · JPL
E	1997 RL13	TNO	9.5	43 km	single	1 day	06 Sep 1997	4	Disc.: Palomar Obs. LoUTNOs, cubewano?	MPC · JPL

back to top

== S ==
U	Designation	Class	Physical		Observations				Description and notes	Ref
U	Designation	Class	H	D	Opp.	Arc	Last	Used	Description and notes	Ref
0	1997 ST7	MBA-O	17.3	1.9 km	multiple	1997–2020	15 Oct 2020	49	Disc.: Spacewatch; Added on 17 January 2021	MPC · JPL
0	1997 SY8	MBA-I	19.14	520 m	multiple	1997–2029	19 Jun 2025	69	Disc.: Spacewatch	MPC · JPL
0	1997 SY11	MBA-M	18.91	410 m	multiple	1997-2023	13 Jan 2023	34	Disc.: Spacewatch	MPC · JPL
1	1997 SB12	MBA-I	19.82	320 m	multiple	1997–2021	30 Nov 2021	41	Disc.: Spacewatch; Alt.: 2014 UG164	MPC · JPL
0	1997 SX16	MBA-M	19.2	430 m	multiple	1997–2022	14 Sep 2022	55	Disc.: Spacewatch; Alt.: 2018 VR92	MPC · JPL
–	1997 SS19	MBA-M	18.8	520 m	single	12 days	10 Oct 1997	9	Disc.: Spacewatch	MPC · JPL
0	1997 SK20	MBA-O	18.39	1 km	multiple	1997–2024	29 Nov 2024	35	Disc.: Spacewatch; Added on 11 May 2021; Alt.: 2013 TB128	MPC · JPL
2	1997 SC26	MBA-M	18.93	700 m	multiple	1997-2022	02 Oct 2022	35	Disc.: Spacewatch	MPC · JPL
0	1997 SF26	MBA-O	16.77	2.5 km	multiple	1997–2021	10 Oct 2021	116	Disc.: Spacewatch; Alt.: 2013 RC1	MPC · JPL
0	1997 SB28	MBA-M	18.0	1.1 km	multiple	1997–2019	27 Nov 2019	83	Disc.: Spacewatch; Alt.: 2015 XF307	MPC · JPL
0	1997 SN29	MBA-I	19.1	460 m	multiple	1997–2022	01 Aug 2022	52	Disc.: Spacewatch; Alt.: 2015 OW28	MPC · JPL
1	1997 SV32	MBA-I	19.23	420 m	multiple	1997–2021	08 Dec 2021	44	Disc.: Spacewatch; Alt.: 2014 TN38	MPC · JPL

back to top

== T ==
U	Designation	Class	Physical		Observations				Description and notes	Ref
U	Designation	Class	H	D	Opp.	Arc	Last	Used	Description and notes	Ref
5	1997 TQ	MBA-O	18.57	970 m	multiple	1997-2017	26 Jan 2017	41	Disc.: Mauna Kea Obs. Added on 21 August 2021	MPC · JPL
0	1997 TL8	MBA-I	18.75	530 m	multiple	1997–2021	09 Oct 2021	64	Disc.: Spacewatch; Alt.: 2014 RW32	MPC · JPL
E	1997 TX8	TNO	8.5	94 km	single	24 days	29 Oct 1997	12	Disc.: Palomar Obs. LoUTNOs, plutino?	MPC · JPL
0	1997 TU12	MBA-M	18.28	680 m	multiple	1997–2022	24 Dec 2022	62	Disc.: Spacewatch	MPC · JPL
0	1997 TO15	MCA	18.7	540 m	multiple	1997–2019	07 Apr 2019	55	Disc.: Spacewatch; Alt.: 2010 TN181	MPC · JPL
7	1997 TZ16	APO	24.5	45 m	single	3 days	12 Oct 1997	27	Disc.: Spacewatch	MPC · JPL
7	1997 TC25	APO	24.6	43 m	single	23 days	23 Oct 1997	17	Disc.: Spacewatch	MPC · JPL
0	1997 TT25	AMO	19.39	490 m	multiple	1997–2026	17 Feb 2026	213	Disc.: Xinglong Stn.	MPC · JPL
0	1997 TS30	MBA-I	19.0	490 m	multiple	1997–2022	29 Aug 2022	36	Disc.: Spacewatch	MPC · JPL

back to top

== U ==
U	Designation	Class	Physical		Observations				Description and notes	Ref
U	Designation	Class	H	D	Opp.	Arc	Last	Used	Description and notes	Ref
6	1997 UR	APO	23.2	81 m	single	21 days	12 Nov 1997	143	Disc.: LINEAR; AMO at MPC	MPC · JPL
0	1997 UE7	MBA-O	16.8	2.4 km	multiple	1997–2021	08 Sep 2021	58	Disc.: Mauna Kea Obs. Added on 29 January 2022	MPC · JPL
0	1997 UT9	MCA	19.61	370 m	multiple	1997–2023	04 Oct 2023	150	Disc.: NEAT/GEODSS; Alt.: 2010 TT19	MPC · JPL
8	1997 UZ10	AMO	23.0	89 m	single	14 days	12 Nov 1997	36	Disc.: LINEAR	MPC · JPL
3	1997 UA11	APO	25.2	32 m	single	13 days	08 Nov 1997	29	Disc.: LINEAR	MPC · JPL
1	1997 UR14	MBA-O	16.95	2.3 km	multiple	1997–2023	18 Mar 2023	28	Disc.: Spacewatch; Alt.: 2014 WP303	MPC · JPL
1	1997 UR19	MBA-M	18.5	840 m	multiple	1997–2018	04 Oct 2018	26	Disc.: Spacewatch	MPC · JPL
E	1997 UG25	TNO	8.5	68 km	single	1 day	27 Oct 1997	4	Disc.: La Palma Obs. LoUTNOs, cubewano?	MPC · JPL

back to top

== V ==
U	Designation	Class	Physical		Observations				Description and notes	Ref
U	Designation	Class	H	D	Opp.	Arc	Last	Used	Description and notes	Ref
8	1997 VG	AMO	22.2	130 m	single	10 days	09 Nov 1997	74	Disc.: LINEAR	MPC · JPL
2	1997 VN4	AMO	23.3	78 m	multiple	1997–2016	08 Nov 2016	140	Disc.: LINEAR	MPC · JPL
8	1997 VG6	APO	19.6	430 m	single	15 days	23 Nov 1997	50	Disc.: LINEAR; Potentially hazardous object	MPC · JPL

back to top

== W ==
U	Designation	Class	Physical		Observations				Description and notes	Ref
U	Designation	Class	H	D	Opp.	Arc	Last	Used	Description and notes	Ref
0	1997 WE14	MBA-M	17.78	1.1 km	multiple	1997–2023	16 Dec 2023	51	Disc.: Spacewatch	MPC · JPL
1	1997 WQ23	APO	20.8	250 m	multiple	1997–2020	18 Dec 2020	185	Disc.: LINEAR; Potentially hazardous object	MPC · JPL

back to top

== X ==
U	Designation	Class	Physical		Observations				Description and notes	Ref
U	Designation	Class	H	D	Opp.	Arc	Last	Used	Description and notes	Ref
0	1997 XS2	AMO	19.63	450 m	multiple	1997–2023	20 Sep 2023	129	Disc.: LINEAR	MPC · JPL
0	1997 XE10	APO	24.53	44 m	multiple	1997–2021	02 Jan 2021	68	Disc.: LINEAR	MPC · JPL

back to top

== Y ==
U	Designation	Class	Physical		Observations				Description and notes	Ref
U	Designation	Class	H	D	Opp.	Arc	Last	Used	Description and notes	Ref
0	1997 YM9	APO	24.36	48 m	multiple	1997–2021	09 Sep 2021	70	Disc.: NEAT/GEODSS; Alt.: 2005 YM128	MPC · JPL
8	1997 YR10	AMO	20.1	340 m	single	6 days	03 Jan 1998	34	Disc.: NEAT/GEODSS	MPC · JPL

back to top
