= List of unnumbered minor planets: 1998 =

This is a partial list of unnumbered minor planets for principal provisional designations assigned between 1 January and 31 December 1998. As of May 2026, a total of 180 bodies remain unnumbered for this period. Also see previous and next year.

Near-Earth obj.	MBA (inner)	MBA (outer)	Centaur
Mars-crosser	MBA (middle)	Jupiter trojan	Trans-Neptunian obj.
Unclassified

== A ==
U	Designation	Class	Physical		Observations				Description and notes	Ref
U	Designation	Class	H	D	Opp.	Arc	Last	Used	Description and notes	Ref
6	1998 AK10	MCA	20.9	200 m	single	33 days	02 Feb 1998	26	Disc.: Spacewatch	MPC; JPL
0	1998 AA12	MBA-I	18.72	540 m	multiple	1998–2021	15 Apr 2021	42	Disc.: Spacewatch	MPC; JPL

back to top

== B ==
U	Designation	Class	Physical		Observations				Description and notes	Ref
U	Designation	Class	H	D	Opp.	Arc	Last	Used	Description and notes	Ref
0	1998 BY7	APO	21.47	180 m	multiple	1998–2021	04 Aug 2021	156	Disc.: Spacewatch; Potentially hazardous object	MPC; JPL
7	1998 BT13	APO	26.5	18 m	single	6 days	30 Jan 1998	15	Disc.: Spacewatch	MPC; JPL
2	1998 BZ13	MBA-I	19.39	410 m	multiple	1998–2023	27 Mar 2023	42	Disc.: Spacewatch; Alt.: 2016 EF148	MPC; JPL
7	1998 BR26	APO	26.0	22 m	single	1 day	31 Jan 1998	19	Disc.: Spacewatch	MPC; JPL
7	1998 BC34	MBA-O	20.8	390 m	single	11 days	02 Feb 1998	15	Disc.: Spacewatch; MCA at MPC	MPC; JPL

back to top

== D ==
U	Designation	Class	Physical		Observations				Description and notes	Ref
U	Designation	Class	H	D	Opp.	Arc	Last	Used	Description and notes	Ref
0	1998 DO11	MBA-O	16.6	2.7 km	multiple	1998–2021	10 Jun 2021	203	Disc.: NEAT/GEODSS; Alt.: 2014 YJ47	MPC; JPL
6	1998 DX11	APO	27.0	14 m	single	3 days	26 Feb 1998	13	Disc.: Spacewatch	MPC; JPL
8	1998 DV20	APO	20.3	310 m	single	10 days	06 Mar 1998	11	Disc.: Spacewatch	MPC; JPL
0	1998 DH22	MBA-I	19.9	310 m	multiple	1998–2021	17 Feb 2021	141	Disc.: Spacewatch; Added on 17 June 2021; Alt.: 2011 BR143	MPC; JPL
0	1998 DM25	MBA-I	18.9	490 m	multiple	1998–2021	10 Apr 2021	35	— Added on 29 January 2022	MPC; JPL
0	1998 DF26	MBA-I	18.96	480 m	multiple	1998–2021	08 May 2021	43	Disc.: Spacewatch	MPC; JPL
7	1998 DK36	ATI	25.0	36 m	single	1 day	24 Feb 1998	4	Disc.: Mauna Kea Obs.	MPC; JPL

back to top

== E ==
U	Designation	Class	Physical		Observations				Description and notes	Ref
U	Designation	Class	H	D	Opp.	Arc	Last	Used	Description and notes	Ref
3	1998 EE3	APO	27.2	13 m	single	3 days	04 Mar 1998	11	Disc.: Spacewatch	MPC; JPL
1	1998 EO3	MBA-I	18.7	540 m	multiple	1998–2020	15 May 2020	35	Disc.: Spacewatch; Added on 19 October 2020	MPC; JPL
2	1998 EP4	APO	21.5	180 m	multiple	1996–1998	05 Apr 1998	71	Disc.: Spacewatch	MPC; JPL

back to top

== F ==
U	Designation	Class	Physical		Observations				Description and notes	Ref
U	Designation	Class	H	D	Opp.	Arc	Last	Used	Description and notes	Ref
0	1998 FL5	APO	21.52	170 m	multiple	1998–2022	19 Oct 2022	114	Disc.: LINEAR	MPC; JPL
0	1998 FM9	AMO	19.70	410 m	multiple	1998–2022	22 Jan 2022	121	Disc.: LINEAR	MPC; JPL
1	1998 FS11	MCA	19.69	390 m	multiple	1998–2025	11 Dec 2025	87	Disc.: NEAT/GEODSS	MPC; JPL
6	1998 FG12	APO	21.0	220 m	single	39 days	02 May 1998	42	Disc.: LINEAR	MPC; JPL
4	1998 FS144	TNO	6.7	235 km	multiple	1998–2022	26 Apr 2022	22	Disc.: Cerro Tololo; LoUTNOs, cubewano (hot), BR-mag: 1.53; taxonomy: IR	MPC; JPL

back to top

== G ==
U	Designation	Class	Physical		Observations				Description and notes	Ref
U	Designation	Class	H	D	Opp.	Arc	Last	Used	Description and notes	Ref
0	1998 GC1	AMO	21.27	210 m	multiple	1998–2023	10 Dec 2023	95	Disc.: LINEAR	MPC; JPL
0	1998 GL10	AMO	19.09	560 m	multiple	1998–2025	18 Oct 2025	289	Disc.: LINEAR; Alt.: 22014 UW34	MPC; JPL
1	1998 GM10	MCA	19.3	410 m	multiple	1998–2021	19 Jun 2021	84	Disc.: LINEAR; Alt.: 2021 ES4	MPC; JPL

back to top

== H ==
U	Designation	Class	Physical		Observations				Description and notes	Ref
U	Designation	Class	H	D	Opp.	Arc	Last	Used	Description and notes	Ref
4	1998 HH1	AMO	23.2	81 m	single	32 days	19 May 1998	40	Disc.: Spacewatch	MPC; JPL
3	1998 HM1	APO	24.4	47 m	single	7 days	25 Apr 1998	33	Disc.: Spacewatch	MPC; JPL
2	1998 HZ7	MBA-O	17.2	2.0 km	multiple	1998–2004	18 Jul 2004	102	Disc.: Kleť Obs.	MPC; JPL
2	1998 HT31	APO	20.8	250 m	single	19 days	09 May 1998	133	Disc.: NEAT/GEODSS; Potentially hazardous object	MPC; JPL
1	1998 HD43	MBA-I	19.37	450 m	multiple	1998–2025	26 Mar 2025	53	Disc.: Spacewatch; Added on 24 December 2021	MPC; JPL
9	1998 HP126	ATE	25.77	25 m	single	1 day	25 Apr 1998	15	Disc.: LINEAR; Added on 21 August 2021	MPC; JPL
3	1998 HL151	TNO	8.1	100 km	multiple	1998–2013	08 May 2013	25	Disc.: Mauna Kea Obs. LoUTNOs, other TNO, BR-mag: 1.06	MPC; JPL
2	1998 HN151	TNO	8.3	91 km	multiple	1998–2017	01 Apr 2017	31	Disc.: Mauna Kea Obs. LoUTNOs, other TNO	MPC; JPL
3	1998 HO151	TNO	8.2	95 km	multiple	1998–2017	30 Mar 2017	19	Disc.: Mauna Kea Obs. LoUTNOs, other TNO	MPC; JPL
E	1998 HR151	TNO	8.6	65 km	single	63 days	30 Jun 1998	11	Disc.: Mauna Kea Obs. LoUTNOs, cubewano?	MPC; JPL

back to top

== K ==
U	Designation	Class	Physical		Observations				Description and notes	Ref
U	Designation	Class	H	D	Opp.	Arc	Last	Used	Description and notes	Ref
4	1998 KH	APO	19.2	510 m	multiple	1998–2015	01 Jun 2015	133	Disc.: LINEAR	MPC; JPL
4	1998 KD3	APO	20.6	270 m	single	28 days	21 Jun 1998	172	Disc.: LINEAR; AMO at MPC	MPC; JPL
0	1998 KF3	AMO	19.09	520 m	multiple	1998–2026	14 Jun 2026	104	Disc.: LINEAR	MPC; JPL
1	1998 KO3	APO	19.74	450 m	multiple	1998-2026	08 Nov 2026	76	Disc.: LINEAR	MPC; JPL
0	1998 KF6	MCA	20.44	260 m	multiple	1998–2025	31 Mar 2025	93	Disc.: LINEAR; Alt.: 2013 JT6	MPC; JPL
6	1998 KJ17	AMO	23.5	71 m	single	8 days	05 Jun 1998	59	Disc.: LINEAR	MPC; JPL
0	1998 KY26	APO	25.73	25 m	multiple	1998–2024	01 May 2024	236	Disc.: Spacewatch	MPC; JPL
2	1998 KY61	TNO	7.3	115 km	multiple	1998–2017	22 Aug 2017	58	Disc.: Cerro Tololo; LoUTNOs, cubewano (cold)	MPC; JPL
4	1998 KS65	TNO	7.65	98 km	multiple	1998–2021	12 Sep 2021	57	Disc.: Cerro Tololo; LoUTNOs, cubewano (cold), BR-mag: 1.73; taxonomy: RR-IR	MPC; JPL
E	1998 KD66	TNO	8.9	57 km	single	10 days	30 May 1998	3	Disc.: Cerro Tololo; LoUTNOs, cubewano?	MPC; JPL
E	1998 KE66	TNO	9.0	54 km	single	10 days	30 May 1998	3	Disc.: Cerro Tololo; LoUTNOs, cubewano?	MPC; JPL
E	1998 KF66	TNO	9.8	52 km	single	10 days	30 May 1998	3	Disc.: Cerro Tololo; LoUTNOs, plutino?	MPC; JPL
E	1998 KG66	TNO	8.9	57 km	single	10 days	30 May 1998	3	Disc.: Cerro Tololo; LoUTNOs, cubewano?	MPC; JPL

back to top

== L ==
U	Designation	Class	Physical		Observations				Description and notes	Ref
U	Designation	Class	H	D	Opp.	Arc	Last	Used	Description and notes	Ref
0	1998 LE	APO	20.36	300 m	multiple	1998–2024	19 May 2024	111	Disc.: LINEAR	MPC; JPL

back to top

== M ==
U	Designation	Class	Physical		Observations				Description and notes	Ref
U	Designation	Class	H	D	Opp.	Arc	Last	Used	Description and notes	Ref
0	1998 MS2	AMO	20.4	300 m	multiple	1998–2023	12 Jan 2023	145	Disc.: CSS	MPC; JPL
7	1998 MV5	APO	24.0	56 m	single	9 days	02 Jul 1998	27	Disc.: LINEAR	MPC; JPL

back to top

== O ==
U	Designation	Class	Physical		Observations				Description and notes	Ref
U	Designation	Class	H	D	Opp.	Arc	Last	Used	Description and notes	Ref
7	1998 OP4	AMO	24.0	56 m	single	4 days	31 Jul 1998	21	Disc.: Spacewatch	MPC; JPL

back to top

== Q ==
U	Designation	Class	Physical		Observations				Description and notes	Ref
U	Designation	Class	H	D	Opp.	Arc	Last	Used	Description and notes	Ref
3	1998 QQ	APO	18.7	650 m	multiple	1998–2019	18 Oct 2019	172	Disc.: LINEAR; Alt.: 2015 TV350	MPC; JPL
0	1998 QF1	MCA	18.82	510 m	multiple	1998–2022	06 Jan 2022	111	Disc.: LINEAR	MPC; JPL
1	1998 QH1	AMO	20.7	260 m	multiple	1998–2002	14 Sep 2002	47	Disc.: LINEAR	MPC; JPL
4	1998 QJ1	CEN	16.64	2.9 km	single	62 days	18 Oct 1998	158	Disc.: LINEAR	MPC; JPL
5	1998 QV3	AMO	20.5	280 m	single	58 days	13 Oct 1998	63	Disc.: LINEAR	MPC; JPL
0	1998 QV27	MCA	19.02	500 m	multiple	1998–2023	16 Apr 2023	59	Disc.: Spacewatch	MPC; JPL
0	1998 QF28	MBA-M	17.64	1.7 km	multiple	1998–2021	29 Aug 2021	69	Disc.: Spacewatch; Alt.: 2012 RC7	MPC; JPL
8	1998 QH28	AMO	22.9	93 m	single	7 days	30 Aug 1998	15	Disc.: Spacewatch	MPC; JPL
0	1998 QP52	MCA	18.08	1.3 km	multiple	1998–2022	09 Jan 2022	103	Disc.: LINEAR	MPC; JPL
0	1998 QJ56	MCA	18.0	1.1 km	multiple	1998–2024	30 Jun 2024	122	Disc.: LINEAR	MPC; JPL
3	1998 QX56	MBA-I	18.8	520 m	multiple	1998–2019	03 Oct 2019	42	Disc.: Spacewatch	MPC; JPL
1	1998 QO59	MBA-I	19.51	390 m	multiple	1998–2025	13 Oct 2025	25	Disc.: Spacewatch	MPC; JPL
0	1998 QA62	APO	19.29	500 m	multiple	1998-2025	03 Apr 2025	167	Disc.: LINEAR; Potentially hazardous object	MPC; JPL
1	1998 QQ85	MCA	18.05	1.4 km	multiple	1998–2021	29 Nov 2021	69	Disc.: LINEAR; Alt.: 2007 PN4	MPC; JPL
1	1998 QX104	MCA	19.69	360 m	multiple	1995–2023	11 Oct 2023	31	Disc.: ODAS	MPC; JPL
5	1998 QA105	AMO	21.5	180 m	single	58 days	27 Oct 1998	24	Disc.: Spacewatch	MPC; JPL
3	1998 QA107	MCA	20.2	270 m	multiple	1998–2018	14 Sep 2018	41	Disc.: Spacewatch; Alt.: 2008 RZ75	MPC; JPL
1	1998 QQ110	MBA-M	17.9	1.1 km	multiple	1998–2015	10 Oct 2015	44	Disc.: Spacewatch; Alt.: 2015 TA182	MPC; JPL
1	1998 QM112	MBA-O	18.06	1.3 km	multiple	1998–2023	23 Jul 2023	37	Disc.: Spacewatch	MPC; JPL

back to top

== R ==
U	Designation	Class	Physical		Observations				Description and notes	Ref
U	Designation	Class	H	D	Opp.	Arc	Last	Used	Description and notes	Ref
2	1998 RC	MCA	19.2	610 m	multiple	1998–2020	26 Sep 2020	68	Disc.: Spacewatch; Added on 9 March 2021; Alt.: 2020 OO6	MPC; JPL
2	1998 RS8	MBA-M	18.3	1.2 km	multiple	2007–2016	07 Nov 2016	30	Disc.: Spacewatch	MPC; JPL
0	1998 RJ11	MBA-I	19.21	450 m	multiple	1998–2023	06 Sep 2023	54	Disc.: Spacewatch; Alt.: 2016 TT88	MPC; JPL
0	1998 RL13	MBA-M	17.7	1.6 km	multiple	1998–2017	25 Oct 2017	45	Disc.: Spacewatch; Alt.: 2003 UW394	MPC; JPL
0	1998 RL21	MBA-M	18.86	540 m	multiple	1998–2023	07 Sep 2023	66	Disc.: Spacewatch	MPC; JPL
1	1998 RJ81	MBA-I	19.61	350 m	multiple	1998–2023	06 Aug 2023	24	Disc.: Spacewatch; Alt.: 2009 VG11	MPC; JPL
1	1998 RT81	MBA-I	18.91	490 m	multiple	1998–2022	25 Jan 2022	34	Disc.: Spacewatch	MPC; JPL
0	1998 RV81	MBA-I	19.52	370 m	multiple	1998–2021	28 Sep 2021	28	Disc.: Spacewatch	MPC; JPL
1	1998 RW81	MBA-O	17.5	1.8 km	multiple	1998–2019	19 Dec 2019	31	Disc.: DB Missing; Added on 22 July 2020	MPC; JPL
2	1998 RX81	MBA-I	19.0	470 m	multiple	1998–2020	07 Sep 2020	40	Disc.: DB Missing; Added on 19 October 2020	MPC; JPL
0	1998 RY81	MBA-O	17.08	2.1 km	multiple	1998–2021	28 Oct 2021	55	Disc.: Spacewatch; Added on 5 November 2021	MPC; JPL

back to top

== S ==
U	Designation	Class	Physical		Observations				Description and notes	Ref
U	Designation	Class	H	D	Opp.	Arc	Last	Used	Description and notes	Ref
1	1998 SP4	MBA-M	18.8	730 m	multiple	1998–2021	03 Jan 2021	61	Disc.: Spacewatch; Alt.: 2011 SF2	MPC; JPL
6	1998 SS4	AMO	21.8	160 m	single	24 days	13 Oct 1998	36	Disc.: LINEAR	MPC; JPL
1	1998 SU4	APO	21.42	200 m	multiple	1998–2014	30 Sep 2014	98	Disc.: LINEAR; Potentially hazardous object	MPC; JPL
1	1998 SG7	MBA-O	17.75	1.6 km	multiple	1998–2024	10 Sep 2024	33	Disc.: Spacewatch	MPC; JPL
0	1998 SD9	ATE	24.09	54 m	multiple	2008–2018	15 Sep 2018	115	Disc.: LINEAR	MPC; JPL
5	1998 SY14	APO	20.6	270 m	single	125 days	24 Jan 1999	68	Disc.: LINEAR; Potentially hazardous object	MPC; JPL
2	1998 SZ14	AMO	19.1	540 m	multiple	1998–2014	02 Jan 2014	66	Disc.: LINEAR; Alt.: 2013 WK103	MPC; JPL
1	1998 ST21	MCA	19.45	370 m	multiple	1998-2025	30 Apr 1925	33	Disc.: Spacewatch	MPC; JPL
2	1998 SG28	MBA-O	17.9	1.5 km	multiple	1998–2020	23 Sep 2020	32	Disc.: Spacewatch; Added on 19 October 2020	MPC; JPL
2	1998 SH28	MCA	19.7	340 m	multiple	1998–2018	14 Aug 2018	22	Disc.: Spacewatch; Added on 24 December 2021	MPC; JPL
–	1998 SQ33	MBA-M	18.0	1.4 km	single	11 days	27 Sep 1998	19	Disc.: LINEAR	MPC; JPL
1	1998 SE35	AMO	19.3	490 m	multiple	1998–2020	19 Jan 2020	118	Disc.: LINEAR	MPC; JPL
0	1998 SB39	MBA-O	17.41	1.8 km	multiple	1998–2021	19 Aug 2021	72	Disc.: Spacewatch; Alt.: 2015 VQ79	MPC; JPL
3	1998 SE39	MBA-M	18.6	800 m	multiple	1998–2020	17 Oct 2020	34	Disc.: Spacewatch; Alt.: 2020 QN35	MPC; JPL
0	1998 SM40	MBA-M	18.2	960 m	multiple	1998–2020	12 Nov 2020	51	Disc.: Spacewatch; Alt.: 2007 VX134	MPC; JPL
1	1998 SP40	MBA-I	19.6	360 m	multiple	1998–2020	20 Oct 2020	74	Disc.: Spacewatch	MPC; JPL
2	1998 SE41	MBA-M	18.5	590 m	multiple	1998–2020	20 Feb 2020	35	Disc.: Spacewatch; Alt.: 2016 CP68	MPC; JPL
–	1998 ST41	MBA-I	18.8	520 m	single	9 days	28 Sep 1998	10	Disc.: Spacewatch	MPC; JPL
1	1998 SV41	MBA-I	19.6	360 m	multiple	1998–2020	14 Dec 2020	42	Disc.: Spacewatch; Alt.: 2009 VH9, 2009 WC265, 2009 WN296	MPC; JPL
1	1998 SR44	MBA-O	17.3	1.9 km	multiple	1998–2020	12 Dec 2020	83	Disc.: Spacewatch; Alt.: 2009 RG49	MPC; JPL
0	1998 SM52	MBA-O	17.38	1.9 km	multiple	1998–2021	30 Nov 2021	68	Disc.: Spacewatch; Alt.: 2009 SG196	MPC; JPL
2	1998 SS167	MBA-M	18.4	880 m	multiple	1998–2020	17 Oct 2020	52	Disc.: Spacewatch; Added on 17 January 2021	MPC; JPL
0	1998 SJ172	MBA-I	19.14	440 m	multiple	1998–2021	10 Jan 2021	37	— Added on 29 January 2022	MPC; JPL
0	1998 SF173	MBA-M	18.28	1.2 km	multiple	1998–2021	27 Oct 2021	49	Disc.: SDSS; Added on 5 November 2021	MPC; JPL
1	1998 SX176	MBA-I	19.1	450 m	multiple	1998–2022	01 Sep 2022	30	Disc.: Spacewatch	MPC; JPL
3	1998 SZ176	MBA-I	18.9	490 m	multiple	1998–2016	22 Nov 2016	29	Disc.: SDSS; Alt.: 2016 WP5	MPC; JPL
0	1998 SZ179	MBA-M	18.77	520 m	multiple	1998–2018	14 Sep 2018	66	Disc.: SDSS; Alt.: 2010 KH60	MPC; JPL
1	1998 SA180	MBA-I	19.07	460 m	multiple	1998–2022	27 Jan 2022	51	Disc.: SDSS	MPC; JPL
0	1998 SE180	MBA-I	18.81	520 m	multiple	1998–2023	10 Sep 2023	39	Disc.: Spacewatch	MPC; JPL
2	1998 SM180	MBA-I	18.4	620 m	multiple	1998–2021	01 Dec 2021	33	Disc.: SDSS	MPC; JPL
0	1998 SU180	MBA-I	18.9	490 m	multiple	1998–2017	16 Nov 2017	39	Disc.: Spacewatch	MPC; JPL
0	1998 SX180	MBA-M	17.87	1.4 km	multiple	1998–2024	16 Mar 2024	23	Disc.: SDSS	MPC; JPL
0	1998 SY180	MBA-M	18.1	1.0 km	multiple	1998–2015	09 Sep 2015	30	Disc.: SDSS	MPC; JPL
0	1998 SA181	MBA-I	18.68	550 m	multiple	1998–2021	29 Nov 2021	37	Disc.: Spacewatch	MPC; JPL
0	1998 SD181	MBA-I	18.80	520 m	multiple	1998–2021	02 Dec 2021	55	Disc.: SDSS	MPC; JPL
0	1998 SE181	MBA-I	19.44	380 m	multiple	1998–2021	11 Jun 2021	32	Disc.: SDSS	MPC; JPL
2	1998 SK181	MBA-O	16.9	2.3 km	multiple	1998–2020	16 Oct 2020	34	Disc.: SDSS; Added on 17 January 2021	MPC; JPL
0	1998 SM181	MBA-I	19.59	370 m	multiple	1998–2023	03 Oct 2023	61	Disc.: Spacewatch; Added on 17 January 2021	MPC; JPL
0	1998 SO181	MBA-O	17.6	1.7 km	multiple	1998–2021	15 Jan 2021	52	Disc.: SDSS; Added on 9 March 2021	MPC; JPL
2	1998 SP181	MBA-O	18.0	1.4 km	multiple	1998–2020	20 Oct 2020	22	Disc.: SDSS; Added on 9 March 2021	MPC; JPL
1	1998 SQ181	MBA-I	19.6	360 m	multiple	1998–2017	16 Oct 2017	30	Disc.: SDSS; Added on 9 March 2021	MPC; JPL
1	1998 ST181	MBA-I	20.0	300 m	multiple	1998–2018	13 Aug 2018	24	Disc.: SDSS; Added on 21 August 2021	MPC; JPL
0	1998 SV181	MCA	20.22	270 m	multiple	1998–2021	06 Sep 2021	36	Disc.: SDSS; Added on 21 August 2021	MPC; JPL
0	1998 SX181	MBA-I	19.24	430 m	multiple	1998–2024	12 Jun 2024	49	Disc.: SDSS; Added on 21 August 2021	MPC; JPL
2	1998 SZ181	MBA-O	17.51	1.8 km	multiple	1998–2021	01 Nov 2021	37	Disc.: SDSS; Added on 5 November 2021	MPC; JPL
0	1998 SA182	MBA-O	17.0	2.3 km	multiple	1998–2023	19 Mar 2023	38	Disc.: SDSS; Added on 24 December 2021	MPC; JPL

back to top

== T ==
U	Designation	Class	Physical		Observations				Description and notes	Ref
U	Designation	Class	H	D	Opp.	Arc	Last	Used	Description and notes	Ref
1	1998 TT3	AMO	18.8	620 m	multiple	1998–2017	16 Apr 2017	132	Disc.: LONEOS	MPC; JPL
0	1998 TA5	MBA-M	18.43	620 m	multiple	1994–2023	11 Oct 2023	48	Disc.: Spacewatch; Alt.: 2002 PG123	MPC; JPL
5	1998 TG20	MBA-I	19.6	360 m	multiple	1998–2015	23 Oct 2015	17	Disc.: Spacewatch; Added on 21 August 2021	MPC; JPL
0	1998 TH25	MBA-I	19.0	470 m	multiple	1998–2021	31 Oct 2021	33	— Added on 29 January 2022	MPC; JPL
1	1998 TV25	MBA-I	18.3	650 m	multiple	1998–2017	07 Dec 2017	53	Disc.: Spacewatch	MPC; JPL
1	1998 TE28	MBA-M	18.6	800 m	multiple	1998–2020	15 Dec 2020	79	Disc.: Spacewatch; Added on 17 January 2021; Alt.: 2016 YV19	MPC; JPL

back to top

== U ==
U	Designation	Class	Physical		Observations				Description and notes	Ref
U	Designation	Class	H	D	Opp.	Arc	Last	Used	Description and notes	Ref
8	1998 UR	AMO	22.7	100 m	single	11 days	27 Oct 1998	23	Disc.: LINEAR	MPC; JPL
1	1998 UM1	AMO	23.4	74 m	multiple	1998–2018	19 Nov 2018	65	Disc.: LINEAR; Alt.: 2018 RP4	MPC; JPL
2	1998 UG13	MBA-O	18.02	1.3 km	multiple	1998-2024	23 Dez 2024	49	Disc.: Spacewatch	MPC; JPL
2	1998 US18	APO	20.9	230 m	multiple	1998–2019	28 Nov 2019	68	Disc.: Spacewatch; Potentially hazardous object Alt.: 2019 VC1	MPC; JPL
8	1998 UY24	APO	21.6	170 m	single	10 days	08 Nov 1998	16	Disc.: LINEAR	MPC; JPL
2	1998 UR43	TNO	8.3	103 km	multiple	1998–2017	23 Dec 2017	38	Disc.: Kitt Peak; LoUTNOs, plutino, BR-mag: 1.27; taxonomy: BR	MPC; JPL
0	1998 UB51	MBA-I	18.7	540 m	multiple	1998–2020	24 Nov 2020	77	Disc.: Spacewatch	MPC; JPL
0	1998 UH51	MBA-M	17.84	1.2 km	multiple	1998–2024	07 Dec 2024	41	Disc.: Spacewatch	MPC; JPL
2	1998 UO51	MBA-I	19.36	400 m	multiple	1998–2021	08 Dec 2021	36	Disc.: Spacewatch	MPC; JPL
0	1998 UT51	MBA-M	18.2	960 m	multiple	1998–2021	12 Jan 2021	40	Disc.: Spacewatch; Added on 17 January 2021	MPC; JPL

back to top

== V ==
U	Designation	Class	Physical		Observations				Description and notes	Ref
U	Designation	Class	H	D	Opp.	Arc	Last	Used	Description and notes	Ref
0	1998 VP	AMO	19.14	550 m	multiple	1998–2023	03 Sep 2023	89	Disc.: LINEAR	MPC; JPL
0	1998 VQ	MCA	19.66	430 m	multiple	1998–2024	10 Dec 2024	88	Disc.: LINEAR; Alt.: 2011 VM1	MPC; JPL
1	1998 VS	APO	22.3	120 m	multiple	1998–2019	05 Feb 2019	67	Disc.: LINEAR; AMO at MPC	MPC; JPL
0	1998 VE31	APO	20.09	230 m	multiple	1998–2025	16 Jan 2025	104	Disc.: LINEAR	MPC; JPL
0	1998 VD32	APO	22.65	100 m	multiple	1998–2020	25 Nov 2020	135	Disc.: LINEAR; Alt.: 2020 SS7	MPC; JPL
0	1998 VF57	MBA-M	18.2	960 m	multiple	1998–2019	29 Oct 2019	56	Disc.: Spacewatch; Alt.: 2015 TS391	MPC; JPL

back to top

== W ==
U	Designation	Class	Physical		Observations				Description and notes	Ref
U	Designation	Class	H	D	Opp.	Arc	Last	Used	Description and notes	Ref
7	1998 WY1	AMO	21.9	150 m	single	12 days	28 Nov 1998	30	Disc.: LINEAR	MPC; JPL
0	1998 WA2	AMO	19.8	390 m	multiple	1998–2021	07 Jan 2021	214	Disc.: LINEAR; Alt.: 2020 PE	MPC; JPL
0	1998 WB2	APO	21.86	150 m	multiple	1998–2023	04 Dec 2023	340	Disc.: LINEAR; Potentially hazardous object Alt.: 2010 GJ7	MPC; JPL
2	1998 WL4	APO	19.5	450 m	multiple	1998–2019	30 Nov 2019	83	Disc.: Spacewatch	MPC; JPL
0	1998 WR5	AMO	18.76	540 m	multiple	1998-2023	06 Dec 2023	68	Disc.: LINEAR	MPC; JPL
2	1998 WS5	MCA	18.6	570 m	multiple	1990–2002	23 Nov 2002	76	Disc.: LINEAR	MPC; JPL
3	1998 WU24	CEN	15.0	6.0 km	single	87 days	20 Feb 1999	62	Disc.: LINEAR, BR-mag: 1.31; MCA at MPC	MPC; JPL
3	1998 WV24	TNO	7.4	104 km	multiple	1998–2020	14 Nov 2020	26	Disc.: Kitt Peak; LoUTNOs, other TNO, BR-mag: 1.27; taxonomy: BR; binary: 91 km	MPC; JPL
2	1998 WX24	TNO	6.7	152 km	multiple	1998–2018	09 Dec 2018	35	Disc.: Kitt Peak; LoUTNOs, cubewano (cold), BR-mag: 1.79; taxonomy: RR	MPC; JPL
E	1998 WZ24	TNO	8.1	113 km	single	65 days	22 Jan 1999	6	Disc.: Kitt Peak; LoUTNOs, plutino?	MPC; JPL
0	1998 WY27	MBA-M	18.1	1.0 km	multiple	1998–2021	07 Jan 2021	38	Disc.: Spacewatch; Alt.: 2011 WP60	MPC; JPL
3	1998 WS31	TNO	8.26	105 km	multiple	1998–2021	11 Jan 2021	33	Disc.: Kitt Peak; LoUTNOs, plutino, BR-mag: 1.32; taxonomy: IR-BR	MPC; JPL
2	1998 WV31	TNO	7.5	150 km	multiple	1998–2017	20 Dec 2017	28	Disc.: Kitt Peak; LoUTNOs, plutino, BR-mag: 1.31; taxonomy: BR	MPC; JPL
2	1998 WW31	TNO	6.7	148 km	multiple	1998–2019	26 Oct 2019	38	Disc.: Kitt Peak; LoUTNOs, cubewano (hot), albedo: 0.054; binary: 123 km	MPC; JPL
5	1998 WY31	TNO	6.98	132 km	multiple	1998–2023	29 Feb 2023	29	Disc.: Kitt Peak; LoUTNOs, cubewano (cold)	MPC; JPL
4	1998 WZ31	TNO	8.21	108 km	multiple	1998–2021	01 Dec 2021	29	Disc.: Kitt Peak; LoUTNOs, plutino, BR-mag: 1.26; taxonomy: BB-BR	MPC; JPL
1	1998 WW39	MBA-I	18.7	540 m	multiple	1998–2019	28 Nov 2019	60	Disc.: Spacewatch; Alt.: 2017 BK116	MPC; JPL
0	1998 WC43	MBA-O	17.2	2.0 km	multiple	1998–2020	14 Nov 2020	40	Disc.: Spacewatch; Added on 17 January 2021; Alt.: 2014 SC50	MPC; JPL
2	1998 WJ44	MBA-M	18.95	480 m	multiple	1998–2023	12 Oct 2023	39	Disc.: La Palma Obs. Added on 22 July 2020	MPC; JPL
1	1998 WK44	JT	15.19	5.6 km	multiple	1998-2024	04 Feb 2024	44	Disc.: La Palma Obs. Greek camp (L4)	MPC; JPL
0	1998 WF45	MBA-I	18.5	590 m	multiple	1998–2021	18 Jan 2021	52	Disc.: La Palma Obs. Added on 24 August 2020	MPC; JPL
1	1998 WL45	MBA-I	18.4	620 m	multiple	1998–2021	09 Apr 2021	38	Disc.: La Palma Obs. Added on 30 September 2021	MPC; JPL
2	1998 WH46	MBA-M	18.4	620 m	multiple	1998–2018	08 Aug 2018	23	Disc.: Spacewatch; Added on 17 January 2021	MPC; JPL
0	1998 WO46	MBA-I	18.98	480 m	multiple	1998–2022	06 Jan 2022	58	Disc.: Spacewatch	MPC; JPL
0	1998 WR46	MBA-I	18.9	490 m	multiple	1998–2018	15 Oct 2018	49	Disc.: Spacewatch	MPC; JPL

back to top

== X ==
U	Designation	Class	Physical		Observations				Description and notes	Ref
U	Designation	Class	H	D	Opp.	Arc	Last	Used	Description and notes	Ref
0	1998 XD9	MCA	18.1	820 m	multiple	1998–2024	15 May 2024	219	Disc.: LINEAR	MPC; JPL
9	1998 XD12	APO	20.96	260 m	single	10 days	24 Dec 1998	60	Disc.: LINEAR; Potentially hazardous object	MPC; JPL
4	1998 XN17	ATE	22.8	98 m	multiple	1998–2004	24 Mar 2004	36	Disc.: LINEAR	MPC; JPL

back to top

== Y ==
U	Designation	Class	Physical		Observations				Description and notes	Ref
U	Designation	Class	H	D	Opp.	Arc	Last	Used	Description and notes	Ref
0	1998 YG10	MCA	19.14	430 m	multiple	1998-2024	19 Jan 2024	51	Disc.: Spacewatch	MPC; JPL
1	1998 YV27	MBA-I	19.2	430 m	multiple	1998–2020	11 Oct 2020	43	Disc.: La Palma Obs. Added on 9 March 2021; Alt.: 2020 QU11	MPC; JPL

back to top
