= List of unnumbered minor planets: 1995 =

This is a partial list of unnumbered minor planets for principal provisional designations assigned between 1 January and 31 December 1995. As of May 2026, a total of 181 bodies remain unnumbered for this period. Also see previous and next year.

Near-Earth obj.	MBA (inner)	MBA (outer)	Centaur
Mars-crosser	MBA (middle)	Jupiter trojan	Trans-Neptunian obj.
Unclassified

== B ==
U	Designation	Class	Physical		Observations				Description and notes	Ref
U	Designation	Class	H	D	Opp.	Arc	Last	Used	Description and notes	Ref
7	1995 BK2	AMO	22.6	110 m	single	7 days	07 Feb 1995	32	Disc.: Spacewatch	MPC · JPL

back to top

== C ==
U	Designation	Class	Physical		Observations				Description and notes	Ref
U	Designation	Class	H	D	Opp.	Arc	Last	Used	Description and notes	Ref
0	1995 CR	ATE	21.76	160 m	multiple	1995–2024	18 Jan 2024	252	Disc.: Spacewatch; Potentially hazardous object Alt.: 2014 CL13	MPC · JPL
8	1995 CS	APO	25.5	28 m	single	3 days	07 Feb 1995	11	Disc.: Spacewatch	MPC · JPL
0	1995 CB3	MBA-I	18.62	620 m	multiple	1995–2025	27 Feb 2025	61	Disc.: Spacewatch; Added on 11 May 2021	MPC · JPL

back to top

== D ==
U	Designation	Class	Physical		Observations				Description and notes	Ref
U	Designation	Class	H	D	Opp.	Arc	Last	Used	Description and notes	Ref
8	1995 DV1	AMO	23.0	89 m	single	8 days	05 Mar 1995	13	Disc.: Spacewatch	MPC · JPL
3	1995 DB2	TNO	7.75	100 km	multiple	1995–2024	14 Apr 2024	46	Disc.: Mauna Kea Obs. LoUTNOs, cubewano (cold)	MPC · JPL

back to top

== F ==
U	Designation	Class	Physical		Observations				Description and notes	Ref
U	Designation	Class	H	D	Opp.	Arc	Last	Used	Description and notes	Ref
7	1995 FF	APO	26.5	18 m	single	5 days	02 Apr 1995	16	Disc.: Spacewatch	MPC · JPL
5	1995 FG	AMO	23.0	89 m	single	56 days	22 May 1995	21	Disc.: Spacewatch	MPC · JPL
0	1995 FO	APO	20.78	250 m	multiple	1995–2024	11 Apr 2024	229	Disc.: Spacewatch	MPC · JPL
1	1995 FX	AMO	20.1	340 m	multiple	1995–2012	29 Feb 2012	204	Disc.: CERGA Obs.	MPC · JPL
E	1995 FB21	TNO	7.5	109 km	single	9 days	07 Apr 1995	12	Disc.: Siding Spring; LoUTNOs, cubewano?	MPC · JPL

back to top

== G ==
U	Designation	Class	Physical		Observations				Description and notes	Ref
U	Designation	Class	H	D	Opp.	Arc	Last	Used	Description and notes	Ref
E	1995 GJ	TNO	7.0	166 km	single	1 day	04 Apr 1995	6	Disc.: Mauna Kea Obs. LoUTNOs, other TNO	MPC · JPL
0	1995 GZ3	MBA-M	17.89	810 m	multiple	1995–2024	09 May 2024	44	Disc.: Spacewatch; Added on 13 September 2020	MPC · JPL
E	1995 GA7	TNO	7.5	150 km	single	2 days	05 Apr 1995	7	Disc.: Mauna Kea Obs. LoUTNOs, plutino?	MPC · JPL
E	1995 GY7	TNO	7.5	109 km	single	1 day	07 Apr 1995	7	Disc.: La Silla Obs. LoUTNOs, cubewano?	MPC · JPL

back to top

== H ==
U	Designation	Class	Physical		Observations				Description and notes	Ref
U	Designation	Class	H	D	Opp.	Arc	Last	Used	Description and notes	Ref
1	1995 HM	AMO	22.66	89 m	multiple	1995-2025	28 Jul 2025	73	Disc.: Spacewatch	MPC · JPL

back to top

== K ==
U	Designation	Class	Physical		Observations				Description and notes	Ref
U	Designation	Class	H	D	Opp.	Arc	Last	Used	Description and notes	Ref
0	1995 KE1	MBA-M	18.41	650 m	multiple	1995–2024	02 May 2024	45	Disc.: Spacewatch; Alt.: 2020 JV17	MPC · JPL
3	1995 KG1	MCA	19.8	610 m	multiple	1995–2010	15 Jul 2010	58	Disc.: Spacewatch	MPC · JPL
E	1995 KJ1	TNO	6.5	172 km	single	26 days	25 Jun 1995	7	Disc.: Mauna Kea Obs. LoUTNOs, cubewano?	MPC · JPL
E	1995 KK1	TNO	8.5	94 km	single	1 day	31 May 1995	5	Disc.: Mauna Kea Obs. LoUTNOs, plutino?	MPC · JPL

back to top

== L ==
U	Designation	Class	Physical		Observations				Description and notes	Ref
U	Designation	Class	H	D	Opp.	Arc	Last	Used	Description and notes	Ref
6	1995 LA	APO	24.0	56 m	single	7 days	08 Jun 1995	49	Disc.: Spacewatch; AMO at MPC	MPC · JPL

back to top

== M ==
U	Designation	Class	Physical		Observations				Description and notes	Ref
U	Designation	Class	H	D	Opp.	Arc	Last	Used	Description and notes	Ref
0	1995 MC6	MBA-M	17.64	900 m	multiple	1995–2024	05 Dec 2024	66	Disc.: Spacewatch	MPC · JPL
0	1995 MC8	MBA-M	17.88	1.6 km	multiple	1995–2026	26 Jun 2026	107	Disc.: Spacewatch	MPC · JPL
0	1995 MR8	MBA-M	17.96	1.5 km	multiple	1995–2026	22 Jun 2026	72	Disc.: Spacewatch; Added on 13 September 2020	MPC · JPL
0	1995 MS8	MBA-I	18.89	490 m	multiple	1995–2026	23 Feb 2026	41	Disc.: Spacewatch Added on 17 January 2021	MPC · JPL

back to top

== N ==
U	Designation	Class	Physical		Observations				Description and notes	Ref
U	Designation	Class	H	D	Opp.	Arc	Last	Used	Description and notes	Ref
8	1995 NA	AMO	23.2	81 m	single	1 day	06 Jul 1995	8	Disc.: Spacewatch	MPC · JPL

back to top

== O ==
U	Designation	Class	Physical		Observations				Description and notes	Ref
U	Designation	Class	H	D	Opp.	Arc	Last	Used	Description and notes	Ref
1	1995 OF16	MBA-I	18.66	570 m	multiple	1995–2023	11 Nov 2023	93	Disc.: Spacewatch	MPC · JPL
0	1995 OE17	MBA-O	16.88	2.3 km	multiple	1995–2026	23 Mar 2026	66	Disc.: Spacewatch	MPC · JPL

back to top

== Q ==
U	Designation	Class	Physical		Observations				Description and notes	Ref
U	Designation	Class	H	D	Opp.	Arc	Last	Used	Description and notes	Ref
0	1995 QV5	MBA-M	17.65	1.3 km	multiple	1995-2026	18 Jan 2026	78	Disc.: Spacewatch Alt.: 2022 AQ10	MPC · JPL
1	1995 QK17	MBA-M	18.1	1.3 km	multiple	1995–2019	02 Jan 2019	42	Disc.: DB Missing; Added on 22 July 2020	MPC · JPL

back to top

== R ==
U	Designation	Class	Physical		Observations				Description and notes	Ref
U	Designation	Class	H	D	Opp.	Arc	Last	Used	Description and notes	Ref
0	1995 RE1	MBA-O	17.81	1.5 km	multiple	1995–2023	07 Dec 2023	59	Disc.: Spacewatch; Added on 29 January 2022	MPC · JPL

back to top

== S ==
U	Designation	Class	Physical		Observations				Description and notes	Ref
U	Designation	Class	H	D	Opp.	Arc	Last	Used	Description and notes	Ref
4	1995 SB	AMO	22.3	120 m	multiple	1995–2016	10 Mar 2016	34	Disc.: Spacewatch	MPC · JPL
6	1995 SC1	AMO	22.7	100 m	single	23 days	16 Oct 1995	15	Disc.: Spacewatch	MPC · JPL
0	1995 SD1	AMO	20.6	270 m	multiple	1995–2009	17 Oct 2009	60	Disc.: Spacewatch	MPC · JPL
5	1995 SA4	AMO	22.3	120 m	single	33 days	30 Oct 1995	30	Disc.: Spacewatch	MPC · JPL
0	1995 SE7	MBA-O	17.24	2.1 km	multiple	1995-2023	05 Sep 2023	41	Disc.: Spacewatch Alt.: 2017 MQ27	MPC · JPL
0	1995 SZ8	MBA-I	18.9	490 m	multiple	1995–2020	26 Jan 2020	35	Disc.: Spacewatch; Alt.: 2007 VS99	MPC · JPL
2	1995 SC9	MBA-M	18.7	1.0 km	multiple	1995–2022	16 Sep 2022	26	Disc.: Spacewatch	MPC · JPL
0	1995 SG11	MCA	19.0	470 m	multiple	1995–2019	04 Dec 2019	67	Disc.: Spacewatch	MPC · JPL
0	1995 SH11	MBA-M	17.85	1.6 km	multiple	1995–2025	07 Jan 2025	67	Disc.: Spacewatch	MPC · JPL
0	1995 SW11	MBA-I	18.88	570 m	multiple	1995–2026	26 Mar 2026	48	Disc.: Spacewatch; Added on 17 January 2021	MPC · JPL
0	1995 SA13	MBA-I	19.53	370 m	multiple	1995–2020	11 Dec 2020	70	Disc.: Spacewatch	MPC · JPL
0	1995 SD13	MBA-I	18.8	520 m	multiple	1995–2019	26 Sep 2019	50	Disc.: Spacewatch; Alt.: 2011 CQ102, 2012 PY10, 2015 KL74	MPC · JPL
0	1995 SQ13	MBA-M	18.0	1.1 km	multiple	1995–2020	15 Sep 2020	70	Disc.: Spacewatch	MPC · JPL
3	1995 SN14	MBA-I	19.48	310 m	multiple	1995-2025	14 Jul 2025	24	Disc.: Spacewatch	MPC · JPL
0	1995 SZ15	MBA-I	19.2	450 m	multiple	1995–2022	14 Dec 2022	37	Disc.: Spacewatch; Alt.: 2014 PQ90	MPC · JPL
0	1995 SJ16	MBA-I	19.21	430 m	multiple	1995–2021	30 Nov 2021	64	Disc.: Spacewatch; Added on 5 November 2021	MPC · JPL
–	1995 SG18	MBA-I	19.4	390 m	single	7 days	25 Sep 1995	9	Disc.: Spacewatch	MPC · JPL
0	1995 SZ23	MBA-I	19.5	390 m	multiple	1995–2024	21 Nov 2024	71	Disc.: Spacewatch	MPC · JPL
0	1995 SU24	MBA-M	18.67	760 m	multiple	1995-2024	28 Nov 2024	985	Disc.: Spacewatch; Alt.: 2015 KO337	MPC · JPL
0	1995 SB29	MCA	18.47	800 m	multiple	1995–2026	19 Jul 2026	40	Disc.: Spacewatch; MBA at MPC	MPC · JPL
0	1995 SU31	MBA-M	18.28	930 m	multiple	1995–2021	28 Oct 2021	80	Disc.: Spacewatch; Added on 30 September 2021; Alt.: 2017 UK151	MPC · JPL
0	1995 SC32	MBA-O	17.64	1.7 km	multiple	1995–2021	08 Dec 2021	56	Disc.: Spacewatch; Added on 24 August 2020	MPC · JPL
1	1995 SD34	MBA-O	17.95	1.5 km	multiple	1995–2024	05 Sep 2024	35	Disc.: Spacewatch	MPC · JPL
2	1995 SH34	MBA-M	18.49	1.2 km	multiple	1995–2023	10 Oct 2023	45	Disc.: Spacewatch; Alt.: 2009 SP173	MPC · JPL
0	1995 SZ34	MBA-I	19.36	400 m	multiple	1995–2025	20 Oct 2025	87	Disc.: Spacewatch; Alt.: 2005 SY36	MPC · JPL
0	1995 SG37	MBA-I	18.8	520 m	multiple	1995–2019	27 Nov 2019	67	Disc.: Spacewatch; Alt.: 2012 QY4	MPC · JPL
0	1995 SU39	MCA	19.21	440 m	multiple	1995–2025	25 Apr 2025	76	Disc.: Spacewatch; Added on 5 November 2021	MPC · JPL
3	1995 SU40	MBA-O	18.05	2.1 km	multiple	1995-2010	15 Nov 2010	23	Disc.: Spacewatch	MPC · JPL
0	1995 SO42	MBA-O	17.41	1.8 km	multiple	1995–2021	03 Oct 2021	50	Disc.: Spacewatch; Alt.: 2016 TX14	MPC · JPL
1	1995 SA43	MBA-I	19.33	400 m	multiple	1995–2021	02 Oct 2021	45	Disc.: Spacewatch; Alt.: 2010 TJ49	MPC · JPL
0	1995 SS43	MBA-I	18.6	570 m	multiple	1995–2021	14 Nov 2021	51	Disc.: Spacewatch; Added on 24 December 2021	MPC · JPL
0	1995 SW44	MBA-I	19.1	450 m	multiple	1995–2019	23 Sep 2019	38	Disc.: Spacewatch; Alt.: 2009 WK178	MPC · JPL
2	1995 SD45	MBA-I	18.81	520 m	multiple	1995–2023	12 Oct 2023	51	Disc.: Spacewatch	MPC · JPL
0	1995 SQ46	MBA-I	19.25	430 m	multiple	1995–2022	31 Jul 2022	43	Disc.: Spacewatch; Alt.: 2012 RA19	MPC · JPL
2	1995 SJ47	MBA-O	17.77	1.6 km	multiple	1995–2021	04 Oct 2021	37	Disc.: Spacewatch; Added on 5 November 2021; Alt.: 2016 SX106	MPC · JPL
0	1995 SL47	MBA-I	18.7	540 m	multiple	1995–2021	06 Oct 2021	31	Disc.: Spacewatch; Added on 5 November 2021; Alt.: 2021 QB55	MPC · JPL
0	1995 SJ48	MBA-I	19.33	400 m	multiple	1995–2021	29 Nov 2021	33	Disc.: Spacewatch	MPC · JPL
1	1995 SB50	MCA	18.8	520 m	multiple	1995–2020	24 Dec 2020	31	Disc.: Spacewatch; Alt.: 1998 SM18	MPC · JPL
2	1995 SS55	MBA-O	18.18	1.4 km	multiple	1995–2022	28 Sep 2022	31	Disc.: Spacewatch; Added on 22 July 2020	MPC · JPL
1	1995 ST56	MBA-M	18.4	880 m	multiple	1995–2021	06 Nov 2021	41	Disc.: Spacewatch; Added on 29 January 2022	MPC · JPL
0	1995 ST57	MBA-I	19.81	320 m	multiple	1995–2021	09 May 2021	44	Disc.: Spacewatch; Alt.: 2005 SF224	MPC · JPL
1	1995 SW57	MBA-M	18.7	540 m	multiple	1995–2020	15 Sep 2020	35	Disc.: Spacewatch; Added on 17 January 2021; Alt.: 2016 PO168	MPC · JPL
0	1995 SU58	MBA-O	17.41	1.9 km	multiple	1995-2022	19 Sep 2022	59	Disc.: Spacewatch	MPC · JPL
0	1995 SY58	MBA-O	17.1	2.1 km	multiple	1995-2018	28 Nov 2018	54	Disc.: Spacewatch Alt.: 2009 DH161	MPC · JPL
1	1995 SA62	MBA-M	18.42	640 m	multiple	1995–2024	11 Sep 2024	39	Disc.: Spacewatch; Added on 17 January 2021	MPC · JPL
2	1995 SG62	HIL	16.8	2.4 km	multiple	1995–2019	28 Nov 2019	42	Disc.: Spacewatch; Added on 17 June 2021; Alt.: 2003 SY378	MPC · JPL
0	1995 ST63	MBA-M	17.58	1.3 km	multiple	1995–2021	29 Sep 2021	43	Disc.: Spacewatch; Added on 22 July 2020	MPC · JPL
2	1995 SD65	MBA-I	19.7	340 m	multiple	1995–2020	05 Nov 2020	51	Disc.: Spacewatch; Alt.: 2013 VF60	MPC · JPL
2	1995 SE65	MBA-I	19.1	450 m	multiple	1995–2020	23 Oct 2020	34	Disc.: Spacewatch	MPC · JPL
2	1995 SL66	MBA-I	20.0	300 m	multiple	1995–2022	17 Sep 2022	28	Disc.: Spacewatch	MPC · JPL
0	1995 SG67	MBA-M	18.6	800 m	multiple	1995–2020	17 Sep 2020	57	Disc.: Spacewatch; Added on 19 October 2020	MPC · JPL
1	1995 SS67	MBA-I	19.35	400 m	multiple	1995–2021	06 Oct 2021	133	Disc.: Spacewatch; Alt.: 2008 RU127	MPC · JPL
3	1995 SV67	MBA-O	18.07	1.4 km	multiple	1995–2022	30 Aug 2022	34	Disc.: Spacewatch; Added on 22 July 2020	MPC · JPL
1	1995 SD68	MBA-I	18.7	540 m	multiple	1995–2020	26 Sep 2020	42	Disc.: Spacewatch; Added on 17 January 2021	MPC · JPL
–	1995 SX68	MBA-M	18.7	760 m	single	10 days	27 Sep 1995	9	Disc.: Spacewatch	MPC · JPL
0	1995 SF69	MBA-I	19.76	320 m	multiple	1995–2024	22 Nov 2024	75	Disc.: Spacewatch	MPC · JPL
–	1995 SL69	MBA-M	19.6	670 m	single	11 days	29 Sep 1995	9	Disc.: Spacewatch	MPC · JPL
0	1995 SO69	MBA-O	17.57	1.7 km	multiple	1995–2021	28 Sep 2021	70	Disc.: Spacewatch	MPC · JPL
0	1995 SR69	MBA-I	19.3	410 m	multiple	1995–2021	30 Nov 2021	54	Disc.: Spacewatch; Added on 24 December 2021	MPC · JPL
2	1995 SF70	MBA-O	17.7	1.6 km	multiple	1995–2021	05 Dec 2021	26	Disc.: Spacewatch; Added on 29 January 2022	MPC · JPL
0	1995 SQ70	MBA-O	17.58	1.7 km	multiple	1995–2021	10 Aug 2021	44	Disc.: Spacewatch; Added on 21 August 2021	MPC · JPL
0	1995 SF71	MBA-M	18.31	920 m	multiple	1995–2021	06 Jun 2021	33	Disc.: Spacewatch; Added on 21 August 2021	MPC · JPL
1	1995 SP72	MBA-M	19.0	600 m	multiple	1995-2020	22 Jul 2020	32	Disc.: Spacewatch Alt.: 2012 SP99	MPC · JPL
1	1995 SG73	MBA-I	18.8	520 m	multiple	1995–2018	05 Oct 2018	43	Disc.: Spacewatch	MPC · JPL
1	1995 SH74	MBA-M	18.94	470 m	multiple	1995–2024	29 Sep 2024	45	Disc.: Spacewatch; Added on 17 January 2021	MPC · JPL
–	1995 SK76	MBA-O	18.5	1.1 km	single	10 days	30 Sep 1995	9	Disc.: Spacewatch	MPC · JPL
0	1995 SP77	MBA-M	18.8	520 m	multiple	1995–2024	05 Jul 2024	74	Disc.: Spacewatch; Added on 17 January 2021; Alt.: 2016 TB139	MPC · JPL
0	1995 SZ77	MBA-M	18.56	680 m	multiple	1995–2020	15 Oct 2020	51	Disc.: Spacewatch; Added on 17 January 2021	MPC · JPL
2	1995 SU78	MCA	20.36	260 m	multiple	1995-2024	05 Oct 2024	37	Disc.: Spacewatch; Alt.: 2024 RA18	MPC · JPL
2	1995 SX78	MBA-M	17.86	1.1 km	multiple	1995–2021	29 Oct 2021	30	Disc.: Spacewatch; Added on 5 November 2021	MPC · JPL
1	1995 SH81	MBA-O	18.57	1.1 km	multiple	1995–2021	26 Oct 2021	42	Disc.: Spacewatch; Added on 24 December 2021	MPC · JPL
1	1995 SP81	MBA-M	18.0	1.4 km	multiple	1995–2020	26 Jan 2020	35	Disc.: Spacewatch; Added on 22 July 2020	MPC · JPL
0	1995 SV81	MBA-O	17.6	1.7 km	multiple	1995–2016	27 Aug 2016	27	Disc.: Spacewatch	MPC · JPL
1	1995 SE83	MBA-O	17.70	1.6 km	multiple	1995–2021	10 Oct 2021	60	Disc.: Spacewatch; Added on 5 November 2021; Alt.: 2016 SA96	MPC · JPL
0	1995 SF83	MBA-I	18.5	590 m	multiple	1995–2020	06 Dec 2020	57	Disc.: Spacewatch	MPC · JPL
0	1995 SN83	MBA-I	19.49	370 m	multiple	1995–2022	26 Sep 2022	42	Disc.: Spacewatch; Added on 22 July 2020; Alt.: 2001 FE240	MPC · JPL
2	1995 SE84	MBA-I	19.12	450 m	multiple	1995-2022	17 Sep 2022	40	Disc.: Spacewatch Alt.: 2022 QK38	MPC · JPL
0	1995 SQ86	MBA-I	19.0	470 m	multiple	1995–2020	15 Oct 2020	47	Disc.: Spacewatch; Added on 17 January 2021	MPC · JPL
0	1995 SO88	MBA-O	17.76	1.5 km	multiple	1995–2024	30 Oct 2024	49	Disc.: Spacewatch	MPC · JPL
2	1995 SN90	MBA-I	19.91	310 m	multiple	1995–2022	20 Sep 2022	34	Disc.: Spacewatch	MPC · JPL
0	1995 SU90	MCA	18.33	680 m	multiple	1995–2023	26 Mar 2023	77	Disc.: Spacewatch; Added on 17 January 2021	MPC · JPL
0	1995 SV90	MCA	20.32	250 m	multiple	1995–2026	09 Aug 2026	77	Disc.: Spacewatch; Added on 17 January 2021	MPC · JPL
0	1995 SW90	MBA-M	18.3	680 m	multiple	1995–2026	13 Feb 2026	81	Disc.: DB Missing; Added on 17 January 2021	MPC · JPL
4	1995 SA91	MBA-I	19.7	340 m	multiple	1995–2021	04 Oct 2021	22	Disc.: Spacewatch; Added on 5 November 2021	MPC · JPL
2	1995 SC91	MBA-O	18.1	1.3 km	multiple	1995–2021	30 Nov 2021	30	Disc.: Spacewatch; Added on 24 December 2021	MPC · JPL

back to top

== T ==
U	Designation	Class	Physical		Observations				Description and notes	Ref
U	Designation	Class	H	D	Opp.	Arc	Last	Used	Description and notes	Ref
0	1995 TZ4	MBA-M	18.8	520 m	multiple	1995–2020	05 Nov 2020	72	Disc.: Spacewatch	MPC · JPL
2	1995 TB9	MBA-O	17.6	1.7 km	multiple	1995–2021	28 Nov 2021	43	Disc.: Spacewatch; Added on 24 December 2021	MPC · JPL
0	1995 TL9	MBA-O	17.9	1.5 km	multiple	1995–2020	24 Dec 2020	29	Disc.: Spacewatch; Added on 22 July 2020	MPC · JPL
0	1995 TC11	HUN	19.27	410 m	multiple	1995–2023	18 Aug 2023	56	Disc.: Spacewatch	MPC · JPL
1	1995 TH11	MBA-O	18.0	1.4 km	multiple	1995–2017	15 Nov 2017	32	Disc.: Spacewatch	MPC · JPL
2	1995 TM11	MBA-I	19.2	430 m	multiple	1995–2020	09 Sep 2020	42	Disc.: Spacewatch	MPC · JPL

back to top

== U ==
U	Designation	Class	Physical		Observations				Description and notes	Ref
U	Designation	Class	H	D	Opp.	Arc	Last	Used	Description and notes	Ref
7	1995 UB	APO	27.3	12 m	single	8 days	26 Oct 1995	24	Disc.: Spacewatch	MPC · JPL
0	1995 UC2	AMO	20.89	200 m	multiple	1995-2021	23 Nov 2021	53	Disc.: Spacewatch Alt.: 2021 RV16	MPC · JPL
0	1995 UV12	MBA-I	19.02	460 m	multiple	1995–2024	27 Aug 2024	43	Disc.: Spacewatch; Alt.: 2006 UO257	MPC · JPL
0	1995 UK19	MBA-O	17.5	1.8 km	multiple	1995–2021	14 Jun 2021	37	Disc.: Spacewatch	MPC · JPL
0	1995 UZ19	MBA-M	17.7	1.6 km	multiple	1995–2016	01 Apr 2016	52	Disc.: Spacewatch; Alt.: 2004 TS27	MPC · JPL
0	1995 UG20	MBA-O	17.21	2.0 km	multiple	1995–2023	15 Jun 2023	46	Disc.: Spacewatch; Alt.: 2018 VN24	MPC · JPL
0	1995 UU21	MBA-M	18.68	560 m	multiple	1995-2024	14 Oct 2024	32	Disc.: Spacewatch	MPC · JPL
0	1995 UW22	MBA-M	18.54	820 m	multiple	1995–2022	27 Jan 2022	40	Disc.: Spacewatch	MPC · JPL
0	1995 US33	MBA-M	18.02	1.0 km	multiple	1995–2021	02 Oct 2021	62	Disc.: Spacewatch; Added on 21 August 2021; Alt.: 2008 RY22	MPC · JPL
1	1995 UA35	MBA-I	19.1	450 m	multiple	1995–2016	25 Oct 2016	30	Disc.: Spacewatch; Added on 17 June 2021; Alt.: 2002 TR337	MPC · JPL
0	1995 UL35	MBA-O	18.00	1.4 km	multiple	1995–2021	24 Oct 2021	80	Disc.: Spacewatch	MPC · JPL
2	1995 US38	MBA-O	18.5	1 km	multiple	1995-2023	13 Oct 2023	30	Disc.: Spacewatch	MPC · JPL
0	1995 UT38	MBA-I	19.53	370 m	multiple	1995–2024	16 Aug 2024	42	Disc.: Spacewatch; Added on 29 January 2022	MPC · JPL
E	1995 US41	MBA-I	18.5	590 m	single	5 days	28 Oct 1995	9	Disc.: Spacewatch	MPC · JPL
1	1995 UO43	MBA-I	18.6	570 m	multiple	1995–2020	17 Dec 2020	51	Disc.: Spacewatch; Added on 11 May 2021; Alt.: 2013 VR60	MPC · JPL
2	1995 UB50	MBA-M	18.5	590 m	multiple	1995–2021	16 Jan 2021	52	Disc.: Spacewatch; Added on 17 January 2021	MPC · JPL
3	1995 UE50	MBA-I	19.2	430 m	multiple	1995–2015	02 Nov 2015	34	Disc.: Spacewatch; Added on 17 January 2021; Alt.: 2015 VZ13	MPC · JPL
0	1995 UH50	MBA-I	19.2	430 m	multiple	1995–2015	08 Oct 2015	49	Disc.: Spacewatch; Alt.: 2015 RY6	MPC · JPL
0	1995 UC51	MBA-I	18.7	540 m	multiple	1995–2021	16 Jan 2021	61	Disc.: Spacewatch; Added on 17 January 2021	MPC · JPL
0	1995 US54	MBA-I	19.37	400 m	multiple	1995–2021	26 Nov 2021	51	Disc.: Spacewatch; Added on 24 December 2021	MPC · JPL
1	1995 UM57	MBA-M	18.31	640 m	multiple	1995–2024	19 Dec 2024	93	Disc.: Spacewatch; Added on 9 March 2021	MPC · JPL
1	1995 UJ58	MBA-I	19.17	410 m	multiple	1995-2023	14 Oct 2023	44	Disc.: Spacewatch	MPC · JPL
0	1995 UM59	MCA	19.4	580 m	multiple	1995–2025	24 Dec 2025	48	Disc.: Spacewatch	MPC · JPL
0	1995 UW60	MBA-O	17.81	1.5 km	multiple	1995–2021	30 Nov 2021	38	Disc.: Spacewatch; Added on 29 January 2022	MPC · JPL
0	1995 UG62	MBA-M	18.56	620 m	multiple	1995–2024	27 Aug 2024	142	Disc.: Spacewatch	MPC · JPL
1	1995 UE63	MBA-I	18.99	490 m	multiple	1995–2024	01 Aug 2024	50	Disc.: Spacewatch	MPC · JPL
0	1995 UN67	MBA-I	19.49	380 m	multiple	1995–2021	15 Aug 2021	49	Disc.: Spacewatch; Added on 17 June 2021; Alt.: 2005 UY542	MPC · JPL
0	1995 UW68	MBA-I	19.4	390 m	multiple	1995–2021	07 Oct 2021	36	Disc.: Spacewatch; Added on 29 January 2022	MPC · JPL
0	1995 UO69	MBA-O	18.12	1.3 km	multiple	1995–2021	31 Oct 2021	49	Disc.: Spacewatch; Added on 5 November 2021; Alt.: 2016 TG178	MPC · JPL
2	1995 UH70	MBA-M	18.91	490 m	multiple	1995–2019	18 Sep 2019	36	Disc.: Spacewatch; Added on 5 November 2021	MPC · JPL
1	1995 UZ70	MBA-O	18.0	1.4 km	multiple	1995–2021	01 Nov 2021	34	Disc.: Spacewatch; Added on 29 January 2022	MPC · JPL
2	1995 UF72	MBA-O	18.11	1.3 km	multiple	1995–2021	08 Sep 2021	36	Disc.: Spacewatch	MPC · JPL
0	1995 UW72	MBA-O	17.25	2.0 km	multiple	1995–2021	10 Sep 2021	64	Disc.: Spacewatch	MPC · JPL
2	1995 UJ74	MBA-O	18.2	1.3 km	multiple	1995–2017	13 Nov 2017	33	Disc.: Spacewatch	MPC · JPL
0	1995 UT74	MBA-I	18.5	590 m	multiple	1995–2020	13 Sep 2020	44	Disc.: Spacewatch; Added on 19 October 2020	MPC · JPL
0	1995 UG75	MBA-I	18.5	590 m	multiple	1995–2019	10 Jan 2019	55	Disc.: Spacewatch	MPC · JPL
2	1995 UL75	MBA-O	17.25	2.0 km	multiple	1995–2021	07 Jan 2021	28	Disc.: Spacewatch; Added on 11 May 2021; Alt.: 2020 WR14	MPC · JPL
1	1995 UE76	MBA-M	18.69	620 m	multiple	1995–2024	10 Sep 2024	39	Disc.: Spacewatch; Added on 17 January 2021	MPC · JPL
2	1995 UO77	MBA-O	17.7	1.6 km	multiple	1995–2020	15 Oct 2020	49	Disc.: Spacewatch; Added on 19 October 2020	MPC · JPL
1	1995 UX79	MBA-I	19.2	430 m	multiple	1995–2020	23 Nov 2020	41	Disc.: Spacewatch; Added on 17 January 2021	MPC · JPL
0	1995 UO80	MBA-M	18.5	990 m	multiple	1995–2025	17 Oct 2025	64	Disc.: Spacewatch	MPC · JPL
2	1995 UN84	MBA-O	17.5	1.8 km	multiple	1995–2020	15 Oct 2020	28	Disc.: No observations Added on 9 March 2021	MPC · JPL

back to top

== V ==
U	Designation	Class	Physical		Observations				Description and notes	Ref
U	Designation	Class	H	D	Opp.	Arc	Last	Used	Description and notes	Ref
0	1995 VY3	MBA-M	18.12	1.0 km	multiple	1995–2021	09 Dec 2021	71	Disc.: Spacewatch; Alt.: 2021 RD103	MPC · JPL
1	1995 VW5	MBA-M	19.25	420 m	multiple	1995-2020	14 Nov 2020	40	Disc.: Spacewatch Alt.: 2020 TR49	MPC · JPL
0	1995 VM7	MBA-O	17.79	1.5 km	multiple	1995–2021	13 Jul 2021	34	Disc.: Spacewatch; Alt.: 2011 SL143	MPC · JPL
2	1995 VT7	MBA-M	18.22	700 m	multiple	1995-2022	29 Oct 2022	42	Disc.: Spacewatch Alt.: 2022 SN164	MPC · JPL
1	1995 VZ7	HIL	16.71	2.4 km	multiple	1995–2025	14 Jul 2025	36	Disc.: Spacewatch; Added on 22 July 2020; Alt.: 2010 RD7	MPC · JPL
0	1995 VY15	MCA	19.44	400 m	multiple	1995–2023	06 Sep 2023	77	Disc.: Spacewatch; Added on 17 January 2021; Alt.: 2020 PF28	MPC · JPL

back to top

== W ==
U	Designation	Class	Physical		Observations				Description and notes	Ref
U	Designation	Class	H	D	Opp.	Arc	Last	Used	Description and notes	Ref
1	1995 WK3	MBA-M	19.5	370 m	multiple	1995–2020	17 Oct 2020	34	Disc.: Spacewatch; Added on 17 January 2021	MPC · JPL
2	1995 WL3	MBA-O	18.7	1.0 km	multiple	1995–2015	14 Jan 2015	77	Disc.: Spacewatch	MPC · JPL
0	1995 WF4	MCA	20.31	250 m	multiple	1995–2024	26 Feb 2024	150	Disc.: Spacewatch	MPC · JPL
0	1995 WO6	MBA-M	18.41	590 m	multiple	1995–2024	29 Nov 2024	137	Disc.: Spacewatch	MPC · JPL
0	1995 WS9	MBA-O	17.21	2.1 km	multiple	1995–2023	03 Dec 2023	58	Disc.: Spacewatch; Added on 22 July 2020; Alt.: 2017 QG91	MPC · JPL
0	1995 WB10	MBA-O	17.85	1.5 km	multiple	1995–2021	30 Nov 2021	69	Disc.: Spacewatch; Added on 24 December 2021	MPC · JPL
0	1995 WH11	MBA-M	17.41	1.4 km	multiple	1995–2026	16 Jun 2026	91	Disc.: Spacewatch; Added on 30 September 2021; Alt.: 2021 JY10	MPC · JPL
0	1995 WP18	MBA-M	17.95	1.1 km	multiple	1995–2021	31 Oct 2021	47	Disc.: Spacewatch; Added on 30 September 2021	MPC · JPL
0	1995 WK25	MBA-M	17.81	1.2 km	multiple	1995–2021	08 Sep 2021	55	Disc.: Spacewatch	MPC · JPL
0	1995 WR28	MBA-M	18.53	650 m	multiple	1995–2024	16 Aug 2024	58	Disc.: Spacewatch; Added on 11 May 2021; Alt.: 2020 UF24	MPC · JPL

back to top

== Y ==
U	Designation	Class	Physical		Observations				Description and notes	Ref
U	Designation	Class	H	D	Opp.	Arc	Last	Used	Description and notes	Ref
0	1995 YT1	MCA	20.82	200 m	multiple	1995–2022	06 Jan 2022	83	Disc.: Spacewatch	MPC · JPL
E	1995 YY3	TNO	8.5	83 km	multiple	1995–1996	13 Sep 1996	21	Disc.: Mauna Kea Obs. LoUTNOs, other TNO	MPC · JPL
1	1995 YV14	MBA-I	18.8	520 m	multiple	1995–2020	17 Nov 2020	45	Disc.: Spacewatch; Added on 17 June 2021; Alt.: 2006 YF68	MPC · JPL

back to top
