= List of unnumbered minor planets =

- Breakdown of 1,585,547 small bodies of the Solar System: (Note: The data for this and other partial lists is sourced from the Minor Planet Center's orbit-database file (MPCORB.DAT). The number of entries typically differs from the summary figures published on the JPL and MPC web pages, as they may lag behind days, weeks, or even months. This includes MPC's "Latest Published Data" and "Archive Statistics – Orbits And Names".) 208,594 single-opposition MPs 476,399 multiple-opposition MPs 895,910 numbered MPs 4,644 comets

The following is a list of unnumbered minor planets in chronological order of their principal provisional designation. Contrary to their numbered counterparts, unnumbered minor planets have a poorly determined orbit due to insufficient observational data. This also includes lost minor planets which have not been observed for many years, or even decades. As of November 2026, the Minor Planet Center (MPC) accounts for 684,993 unnumbered minor planets which represent 43% of the overall minor planet population. Unnumbered minor planets can be further divided into 208,594 single-opposition objects with short observation arcs, prone to mismatch and loss, and 476,399 objects that have been observed multiple times during opposition, when astrometric conditions are most favorable. The JPL Small-Body Database gives a running total of 685,039 unnumbered minor planets.

The tables below contain 106 objects with a principal designation assigned between 1942 and 1994. Additional partial lists cover the period from 1995 to 2004. Unnumbered minor planets detected after 2004 are not listed due to their large number. The orbital uncertainty parameter (U) ranges from low ("0") to very high ("9"). For some single-opposition objects no numeric uncertainty is given ("–"), with "E" indicating an estimated, rather than determined orbital eccentricity. Furthermore, a color code is used to indicate a body's basic dynamical classification, with additional information given in columns "class" and "description and notes" (especially for near-Earth objects, Jupiter trojans and distant objects). If available, mean diameters are taken from the latest NEOWISE publication, or, if not available, estimated based on an object's absolute magnitude and displayed in italics.

In the Minor Planet Circular from July 2018, the MPC announced that changes in their data processing pipeline will enable numberings to occur more frequently. It is stated that the new method will clear the backlog of unnumbered minor planets with an already well-established orbit without changing the criteria for numbering. Previously, this was not possible because of the difficulty of determining who was the discoverer. Despite this announcement, however, the total of unnumbered minor planets has since significantly increased rather than decreased.

== Statistics ==
Unnumbered minor planets (uMPs), in thousands, by year of principal designation. As of 16 November 2026 the MPC's orbit database contains 684,993 uMPs. Objects observed on a single opposition (total of 208,594) are displayed with a lighter color than multi-opposition objects (total of 476,399).
Until 2004: 11,019 uMPs (2%) are listed on this and other partial pages
Since 2005: 673,974 uMPs (98%) are not listed
1900–1979 · 1980–1989 · 1990–1992 · 1993 · 1994 · 1995 · 1996 · 1997 · 1998 · 1999 A–R · 1999 S–T · 1999 U–Y · 2000 A–E · 2000 F–O · 2000 P–R · 2000 S–T · 2000 U–Y · 2001 A–E · 2001 F (i) · 2001 F (ii) · 2001 G–O · 2001 P–R · 2001 S · 2001 T · 2001 U · 2001 V–W · 2001 X–Y · 2002 A–B · 2002 C · 2002 D–F · 2002 G–K · 2002 L–O · 2002 P · 2002 Q (i) · 2002 Q (ii) · 2002 R (i) · 2002 R (ii) · 2002 S · 2002 T (i) · 2002 T (ii) · 2002 U–V · 2002 W–Y · 2003 A–E · 2003 F–G · 2003 H–L · 2003 M–R · 2003 S (i) · 2003 S (ii) · 2003 S (iii) · 2003 S (iv) · 2003 T · 2003 U (i) · 2003 U (ii) · 2003 U (iii) · 2003 U (iv) · 2003 V · 2003 W (i) · 2003 W (ii) · 2003 X–Y · 2004 A–B · 2004 C · 2004 D–E · 2004 F · 2004 G–H · 2004 J–O · 2004 P–Q · 2004 R (i) · 2004 R (ii) · 2004 R (iii) · 2004 S · 2004 T (i) · 2004 T (ii) · 2004 T (iii) · 2004 T (iv) · 2004 U–V · 2004 W–X · 2004 Y
Navigation of unnumbered minor planets by year of principal provisional designation until 2004.

== Legend ==
| Near-Earth obj. | MBA (inner) | MBA (outer) | Centaur |
| Mars-crosser | MBA (middle) | Jupiter trojan | Trans-Neptunian obj. |
| Unclassified |

== 1900–1979 ==
| U | Designation | Class | Physical | | Observations | | | | Description and notes | Ref |
| U | Designation | Class | H | D | Opp. | Arc | Last | Used | Description and notes | Ref |
|---|---|---|---|---|---|---|---|---|---|---|
| – | 1942 RH | MBA-I | 13.8 | 5.2 km | single | 10 days | 15 Sep 1942 | 3 | Disc.: Turku Obs. | MPC; JPL |
| 0 | 4847 P-L | MBA-I | 18.18 | 730 m | multiple | 1960-2024 | 06 Oct 2024 | 72 | Disc.: Palomar–Leiden | MPC; JPL |
| 0 | 6331 P-L | MBA-I | 18.61 | 590 m | multiple | 1960–2024 | 16 Jun 2024 | 90 | Disc.: Palomar–Leiden | MPC; JPL |
| 0 | 6344 P-L | APO | 20.52 | 300 m | multiple | 1960–2021 | 04 Aug 2021 | 129 | Disc.: Palomar–Leiden; Potentially hazardous object | MPC; JPL |
| 0 | 1960 SB1 | MCA | 17.92 | 1.5 km | multiple | 1960-2026 | 10 Nov 2026 | 64 | Disc.: Palomar Obs. Alt.: 2017 CT1 | MPC; JPL |
| 9 | 1979 XB | APO | 18.6 | 680 m | single | 4 days | 15 Dec 1979 | 16 | Disc.: Siding Spring; Potentially hazardous object | MPC; JPL |

back to top

== 1980–1989 ==
| U | Designation | Class | Physical | | Observations | | | | Description and notes | Ref |
| U | Designation | Class | H | D | Opp. | Arc | Last | Used | Description and notes | Ref |
|---|---|---|---|---|---|---|---|---|---|---|
| 0 | 1982 YA | AMO | 18.09 | 1 km | multiple | 1982–2025 | 07 Jan 2025 | 88 | Disc.: Haute-Provence; NEO larger than 1 kilometer Alt.: 2003 WE42 | MPC; JPL |
| 0 | 1983 QC | MCA | 18.65 | 600 m | multiple | 1983–2025 | 22 Dec 2025 | 105 | Disc.: Palomar Obs. | MPC; JPL |
| 0 | 1986 NA | AMO | 19.85 | 380 m | multiple | 1986–2021 | 31 Oct 2021 | 88 | Disc.: Palomar Obs. Alt.: 2013 UU3 | MPC; JPL |
| 0 | 1988 NE | AMO | 19.06 | 500 m | multiple | 1988–2025 | 13 Aug 2025 | 201 | Disc.: Palomar Obs. | MPC; JPL |
| 0 | 1988 PF1 | MCA | 16.76 | 2.5 km | multiple | 1988–2026 | 19 Jan 2026 | 339 | Disc.: Palomar Obs. Alt.: 2009 WD77 | MPC; JPL |
| – | 1988 RH9 | MBA-M | 11.1 | 25 km | single | 11 days | 12 Sep 1988 | 15 | Disc.: La Silla Obs. | MPC; JPL |
| E | 1989 FR | MBA-O | 13.5 | 11 km | single | 2 days | 28 Mar 1989 | 6 | Disc.: Kleť Obs. | MPC; JPL |

back to top

== 1990–1992 ==
| U | Designation | Class | Physical | | Observations | | | | Description and notes | Ref |
| U | Designation | Class | H | D | Opp. | Arc | Last | Used | Description and notes | Ref |
|---|---|---|---|---|---|---|---|---|---|---|
| 2 | 1990 HY6 | MBA-O | 17.75 | 1.6 km | multiple | 1990–2022 | 19 Nov 2022 | 42 | Disc.: Siding Spring; Alt.: 2012 XV90 | MPC; JPL |
| 8 | 1990 UN | APO | 23.5 | 71 m | single | 15 days | 06 Nov 1990 | 22 | Disc.: Spacewatch | MPC; JPL |
| 3 | 1991 BA | APO | 28.6 | 7 m | single | 0 day | 18 Jan 1991 | 7 | Disc.: Spacewatch | MPC; JPL |
| 0 | 1991 GK | MCA | 19.43 | 390 m | multiple | 1991–2020 | 27 May 2020 | 128 | Disc.: Spacewatch; Alt.: 2020 BE6 | MPC; JPL |
| 0 | 1991 GO | APO | 20.14 | 340 m | multiple | 1991–2025 | 03 Oct 2025 | 98 | Disc.: Kitami Obs. Potentially hazardous object Alt.: 1999 HC | MPC; JPL |
| 7 | 1991 JR | AMO | 23.4 | 71 m | single | 11 days | 19 May 1991 | 20 | Disc.: Spacewatch | MPC; JPL |
| 0 | 1991 RN28 | MBA-I | 19.29 | 430 m | multiple | 1991–2025 | 26 Nov 2025 | 39 | Disc.: Spacewatch | MPC; JPL |
| 7 | 1991 TT | APO | 26.0 | 22 m | single | 3 days | 09 Oct 1991 | 8 | Disc.: Spacewatch; AMO at MPC | MPC; JPL |
| 6 | 1991 TU | APO | 28.4 | 7 m | single | 0 day | 07 Oct 1991 | 4 | Disc.: Spacewatch | MPC; JPL |
| – | 1991 VA | APO | 26.5 | 18 m | single | 8 days | 09 Nov 1991 | 13 | Disc.: Spacewatch | MPC; JPL |
| E | 1991 VD | HUN | 19.5 | 370 m | single | 2 days | 06 Nov 1991 | 9 | Disc.: Spacewatch; MCA at MPC | MPC; JPL |
| 0 | 1991 VG | APO | 28.3 | 8 m | multiple | 1991–2017 | 01 Jun 2017 | 66 | Disc.: Spacewatch | MPC; JPL |
| 8 | 1991 XA | APO | 23.7 | 65 m | single | 12 days | 15 Dec 1991 | 7 | Disc.: Spacewatch | MPC; JPL |
| 1 | 1991 XB | AMO | 18.8 | 620 m | multiple | 1991–2011 | 24 Jul 2011 | 38 | Disc.: Palomar Obs. | MPC; JPL |
| 7 | 1992 DU | APO | 25.3 | 31 m | single | 3 days | 29 Feb 1992 | 11 | Disc.: Spacewatch | MPC; JPL |
| 5 | 1992 JD | APO | 25.0 | 36 m | single | 6 days | 09 May 1992 | 23 | Disc.: Spacewatch; AMO at MPC | MPC; JPL |
| 0 | 1992 SW | MCA | 19.93 | 300 m | multiple | 1992–2024 | 09 Aug 2024 | 55 | Disc.: Spacewatch | MPC; JPL |
| 0 | 1992 SX | MCA | 20.33 | 300 m | multiple | 1992-2025 | 11 Nov 2025 | 39 | Disc.: Spacewatch | MPC; JPL |
| 0 | 1992 SZ | AMO | 19.97 | 350 m | multiple | 1992–2024 | 02 Jun 2024 | 70 | Disc.: Spacewatch | MPC; JPL |
| 0 | 1992 SW11 | MBA-I | 17.28 | 1.0 km | multiple | 1992–2025 | 25 Mar 2025 | 30 | Disc.: Spacewatch | MPC; JPL |
| 0 | 1992 SB12 | MBA-I | 19.09 | 600 m | multiple | 1992–2024 | 20 Nov 2024 | 90 | Disc.: Spacewatch; Alt.: 2017 SW186 | MPC; JPL |
| E | 1992 SZ17 | MBA-M | 13.8 | 7.3 km | single | 4 days | 03 Oct 1992 | 6 | Disc.: Palomar Obs. | MPC; JPL |
| E | 1992 TY1 | MBA-O | 12.8 | 15 km | single | 3 days | 05 Oct 1992 | 5 | Disc.: Kitt Peak Obs. | MPC; JPL |
| – | 1992 TZ1 | MBA-I | 15.5 | 2.4 km | single | 4 days | 05 Oct 1992 | 5 | Disc.: Kitt Peak Obs. | MPC; JPL |
| 0 | 1992 XA | MBA-O | 17.56 | 1.8 km | multiple | 1992–2026 | 09 Mar 2026 | 161 | Disc.: Spacewatch; Alt.: 2005 UG242 | MPC; JPL |
| 4 | 1992 YD3 | APO | 26.4 | 19 m | single | 0 day | 27 Dec 1992 | 12 | Disc.: Spacewatch; AMO at MPC | MPC; JPL |

back to top

== 1993 ==
| U | Designation | Class | Physical | | Observations | | | | Description and notes | Ref |
| U | Designation | Class | H | D | Opp. | Arc | Last | Used | Description and notes | Ref |
|---|---|---|---|---|---|---|---|---|---|---|
| 7 | 1993 BD3 | AMO | 26.2 | 20 m | single | 5 days | 31 Jan 1993 | 14 | Disc.: Spacewatch | MPC; JPL |
| 7 | 1993 BU3 | AMO | 21.17 | 210 m | single | 33 days | 03 Mar 1993 | 18 | Disc.: Spacewatch | MPC; JPL |
| 1 | 1993 BC10 | MBA-M | 18.58 | 800 m | multiple | 1993–2024 | 12 Aug 2024 | 58 | Disc.: Spacewatch | MPC; JPL |
| 6 | 1993 DA | ATE | 26.4 | 19 m | single | 5 days | 22 Feb 1993 | 18 | Disc.: Spacewatch | MPC; JPL |
| 7 | 1993 FA1 | APO | 25.9 | 23 m | single | 3 days | 31 Mar 1993 | 17 | Disc.: Spacewatch; AMO at MPC | MPC; JPL |
| 0 | 1993 HC | APO | 20.77 | 250 m | multiple | 1993–2021 | 07 May 2021 | 58 | Disc.: Spacewatch | MPC; JPL |
| 3 | 1993 HP1 | APO | 27.1 | 14 m | single | 0 day | 27 Apr 1993 | 27 | Disc.: Spacewatch | MPC; JPL |
| 6 | 1993 KA | APO | 26.1 | 22 m | single | 12 days | 29 May 1993 | 38 | Disc.: Spacewatch; AMO at MPC | MPC; JPL |
| 9 | 1993 KA2 | APO | 29.0 | 6 m | single | 1 day | 22 May 1993 | 14 | Disc.: Spacewatch | MPC; JPL |
| 1 | 1993 OT | MCA | 18.64 | 470 m | multiple | 1993-2021 | 03 Jul 2021 | 23 | Disc.: Spacewatch | MPC; JPL |
| 1 | 1993 OY13 | MBA-I | 18.84 | 510 m | multiple | 1993–2022 | 19 Nov 2022 | 35 | Disc.: Spacewatch | MPC; JPL |
| 0 | 1993 PK1 | MBA-I | 18.88 | 510 m | multiple | 1993–2026 | 19 Jun 2026 | 83 | Disc.: Spacewatch | MPC; JPL |
| 3 | 1993 RP | TNO | 9.37 | 59 km | multiple | 1993-2016 | 02 Nov 2016 | 37 | Disc.: Mauna Kea Obs. LoUTNOs, res · 4:5; Alt.: 2015 VR202 | MPC; JPL |
| 1 | 1993 TZ | APO | 26.0 | 22 m | multiple | 1993–2016 | 14 Oct 2016 | 34 | Disc.: Spacewatch | MPC; JPL |
| – | 1993 TR2 | MCA | 20.4 | 350 m | single | 12 days | 24 Oct 1993 | 15 | Disc.: Spacewatch | MPC; JPL |
| 0 | 1993 TK4 | MBA-M | 18.75 | 740 m | multiple | 1993–2023 | 18 Oct 2023 | 60 | Disc.: Spacewatch; Alt.: 2019 SY43 | MPC; JPL |
| 6 | 1993 UA | APO | 25.4 | 30 m | single | 3 days | 24 Oct 1993 | 15 | Disc.: Spacewatch | MPC; JPL |
| 0 | 1993 UD | AMO | 20.38 | 300 m | multiple | 1993–2025 | 17 Dec 2025 | 69 | Disc.: Spacewatch | MPC; JPL |
| 0 | 1993 UY7 | MCA | 18.75 | 530 m | multiple | 1993-2022 | 23 Oct 2022 | 52 | Disc.: Spacewatch; Alt.: 2015 XV465 | MPC; JPL |
| 1 | 1993 VC | MCA | 20.5 | 330 m | multiple | 1993–2007 | 11 Nov 2007 | 34 | Disc.: Spacewatch | MPC; JPL |

back to top

== 1994 ==
| U | Designation | Class | Physical | | Observations | | | | Description and notes | Ref |
| U | Designation | Class | H | D | Opp. | Arc | Last | Used | Description and notes | Ref |
|---|---|---|---|---|---|---|---|---|---|---|
| 0 | 1994 AD17 | MBA-M | 18.64 | 790 m | multiple | 1994–2024 | 08 Feb 2024 | 33 | Disc.: Spacewatch | MPC; JPL |
| 2 | 1994 BB | AMO | 23.5 | 71 m | multiple | 1994–2017 | 18 Feb 2017 | 58 | Disc.: Spacewatch | MPC; JPL |
| 1 | 1994 BW2 | MBA-M | 18.41 | 870 m | multiple | 1994–2024 | 30 Jan 2024 | 30 | Disc.: Spacewatch | MPC; JPL |
| 0 | 1994 BA6 | MBA-M | 18.92 | 690 m | multiple | 1994–2022 | 16 Oct 2022 | 44 | Disc.: Spacewatch; Alt.: 2018 QG9 | MPC; JPL |
| 3 | 1994 EJ | MCA | 19.1 | 450 m | multiple | 1994–2020 | 28 Apr 2020 | 56 | Disc.: Spacewatch | MPC; JPL |
| 1 | 1994 EK | APO | 20.3 | 310 m | multiple | 1994–2013 | 14 Feb 2013 | 99 | Disc.: Spacewatch; Potentially hazardous object | MPC; JPL |
| 7 | 1994 EU | APO | 25.9 | 23 m | single | 12 days | 22 Mar 1994 | 16 | Disc.: Spacewatch | MPC; JPL |
| – | 1994 ES1 | APO | 28.5 | 7 m | single | 1 day | 15 Mar 1994 | 13 | Disc.: Spacewatch | MPC; JPL |
| 3 | 1994 ES2 | TNO | 7.6 | 100 km | multiple | 1994–2015 | 18 Feb 2015 | 36 | Disc.: Mauna Kea Obs. LoUTNOs, cubewano (cold), BR-mag: 1.65 | MPC; JPL |
| 7 | 1994 FA | APO | 25.2 | 32 m | single | 4 days | 20 Mar 1994 | 15 | Disc.: Spacewatch; AMO at MPC | MPC; JPL |
| 8 | 1994 GK | APO | 24.2 | 51 m | single | 3 days | 10 Apr 1994 | 10 | Disc.: Spacewatch | MPC; JPL |
| 3 | 1994 GL | ATE | 25.5 | 28 m | multiple | 1994–2020 | 06 Apr 2020 | 88 | Disc.: Spacewatch | MPC; JPL |
| 7 | 1994 GV | APO | 27.4 | 12 m | single | 2 days | 15 Apr 1994 | 11 | Disc.: Spacewatch | MPC; JPL |
| 0 | 1994 JB6 | MBA-M | 18.38 | 700 m | multiple | 1994–2023 | 22 Jun 2023 | 63 | Disc.: Spacewatch; Alt.: 2019 KC16 | MPC; JPL |
| 0 | 1994 JO8 | MBA-O | 17.92 | 1.4 km | multiple | 1994-2021 | 07 Feb 2021 | 26 | Disc.: Mauna Kea Obs. Alt.: 2016 FR28 | MPC; JPL |
| 8 | 1994 NE | APO | 19.8 | 390 m | single | 26 days | 08 Jul 1994 | 48 | Disc.: Palomar Obs. Potentially hazardous object | MPC; JPL |
| 0 | 1994 NK | AMO | 20.0 | 360 m | multiple | 1994–2019 | 04 Feb 2019 | 300 | Disc.: Spacewatch | MPC; JPL |
| 0 | 1994 PC3 | MBA-M | 17.88 | 820 m | multiple | 1994–2025 | 03 Mar 2025 | 193 | Disc.: La Silla Obs. Alt.: 2016 AW90 | MPC; JPL |
| 7 | 1994 RB | APO | 23.4 | 74 m | single | 2 days | 03 Sep 1994 | 21 | Disc.: Spacewatch | MPC; JPL |
| – | 1994 RV1 | MCA | 19.9 | 310 m | single | 23 days | 28 Sep 1994 | 9 | Disc.: Spacewatch | MPC; JPL |
| 0 | 1994 RW1 | MCA | 19.03 | 490 m | multiple | 1994–2025 | 31 Oct 2025 | 70 | Disc.: Spacewatch | MPC; JPL |
| 1 | 1994 RT14 | MCA | 19.3 | 410 m | multiple | 1994–2024 | 07 May 2024 | 34 | Disc.: La Silla Obs. Alt.: 2018 LO4 | MPC; JPL |
| 0 | 1994 SP1 | MBA-I | 19.01 | 470 m | multiple | 1994–2019 | 01 Jul 2019 | 59 | Disc.: Spacewatch; Alt.: 2010 UB20 | MPC; JPL |
| 1 | 1994 SD3 | MBA-M | 18.3 | 920 m | multiple | 1994–2021 | 14 Aug 2021 | 30 | Disc.: Spacewatch; Alt.: 2012 QR74 | MPC; JPL |
| 1 | 1994 SM6 | MBA-M | 18.77 | 730 m | multiple | 1994–2020 | 19 Nov 2020 | 59 | Disc.: Spacewatch; Alt.: 2020 UT31 | MPC; JPL |
| 1 | 1994 SP8 | MBA-O | 17.88 | 1.5 km | multiple | 1994–2022 | 29 Nov 2022 | 44 | Disc.: Spacewatch; Alt.: 2005 SQ199 | MPC; JPL |
| 2 | 1994 SZ10 | MBA-O | 17.88 | 2.0 km | multiple | 1994–2022 | 18 Oct 2022 | 29 | Disc.: Spacewatch | MPC; JPL |
| 3 | 1994 TA | CEN | 11.16 | 28 km | multiple | 1994–2021 | 16 Feb 2021 | 35 | Disc.: Mauna Kea Obs., BR-mag: 1.98; taxonomy: RR | MPC; JPL |
| E | 1994 TG | TNO | 7.0 | 204 km | single | 3 days | 06 Oct 1994 | 8 | Disc.: Mauna Kea Obs. LoUTNOs, cubewano (hot) | MPC; JPL |
| E | 1994 TH | TNO | 7.0 | 166 km | single | 3 days | 06 Oct 1994 | 6 | Disc.: Mauna Kea Obs. LoUTNOs, other TNO | MPC; JPL |
| 1 | 1994 TA2 | AMO | 20.39 | 310 m | multiple | 1994-2024 | 29 Nov 2024 | 50 | Disc.: Spacewatch | MPC; JPL |
| 7 | 1994 TE2 | AMO | 22.7 | 100 m | single | 2 days | 13 Oct 1994 | 15 | Disc.: Spacewatch | MPC; JPL |
| – | 1994 TG2 | TNO | 7.0 | 137 km | single | 32 days | 09 Nov 1994 | 8 | Disc.: La Silla Obs. LoUTNOs, cubewano? | MPC; JPL |
| 0 | 1994 TN12 | MBA-M | 18.7 | 760 m | multiple | 1994–2020 | 15 Oct 2020 | 39 | Disc.: Spacewatch | MPC; JPL |
| 1 | 1994 TP12 | MBA-I | 18.87 | 520 m | multiple | 1994–2024 | 01 Sep 2024 | 33 | Disc.: Spacewatch | MPC; JPL |
| 0 | 1994 TR13 | MBA-I | 19.76 | 330 m | multiple | 1994–2019 | 29 Jun 2019 | 35 | Disc.: Spacewatch | MPC; JPL |
| 0 | 1994 TC18 | MBA-O | 17.03 | 2.2 km | multiple | 1994–2021 | 03 May 2021 | 43 | Disc.: Spacewatch | MPC; JPL |
| 6 | 1994 US | AMO | 21.0 | 220 m | single | 13 days | 11 Nov 1994 | 18 | Disc.: Spacewatch | MPC; JPL |
| 1 | 1994 UE5 | MBA-O | 17.62 | 1.6 km | multiple | 1994–2022 | 16 Nov 2022 | 33 | Disc.: Spacewatch | MPC; JPL |
| 0 | 1994 UF10 | MBA-M | 17.97 | 1.4 km | multiple | 1994–2021 | 10 Sep 2021 | 46 | Disc.: Spacewatch | MPC; JPL |
| 1 | 1994 UJ10 | MCA | 19.77 | 700 m | multiple | 1994-2024 | 18 Dec 2024 | 53 | Disc.: Spacewatch; Alt.: 2024 TM39 | MPC; JPL |
| 5 | 1994 VH8 | APO | 27.7 | 10 m | single | 0 day | 01 Nov 1994 | 5 | Disc.: Spacewatch | MPC; JPL |
| 1 | 1994 WY1 | MCA | 18.8 | 730 m | multiple | 1994–2019 | 29 Sep 2019 | 114 | Disc.: Spacewatch; Alt.: 2015 RY30 | MPC; JPL |
| 0 | 1994 WZ2 | MCA | 17.85 | 1.5 km | multiple | 1990–2026 | 17 Feb 2026 | 72 | Disc.: Siding Spring | MPC; JPL |
| 0 | 1994 WR12 | ATE | 22.41 | 120 m | multiple | 1994–2025 | 18 Dec 2025 | 133 | Disc.: Palomar Obs. | MPC; JPL |
| 3 | 1994 XG | APO | 18.68 | 680 m | multiple | 1994–2024 | 21 Dec 2024 | 70 | Disc.: Spacewatch | MPC; JPL |
| 3 | 1994 XM1 | APO | 28.2 | 8 m | single | 0 day | 09 Dec 1994 | 10 | Disc.: Spacewatch | MPC; JPL |

back to top

== 1995–2004 ==
- List of unnumbered minor planets: 1995
- List of unnumbered minor planets: 1996
- List of unnumbered minor planets: 1997
- List of unnumbered minor planets: 1998
- List of unnumbered minor planets: 1999 A–R
- List of unnumbered minor planets: 1999 S–T
- List of unnumbered minor planets: 1999 U–Y
- List of unnumbered minor planets: 2000 A–E
- List of unnumbered minor planets: 2000 F–O
- List of unnumbered minor planets: 2000 P–R
- List of unnumbered minor planets: 2000 S–T
- List of unnumbered minor planets: 2000 U–Y

2001

- List of unnumbered minor planets: 2001 A–E
- List of unnumbered minor planets: 2001 F (0–216)
- List of unnumbered minor planets: 2001 F (217–619)
- List of unnumbered minor planets: 2001 G–O
- List of unnumbered minor planets: 2001 P–R
- List of unnumbered minor planets: 2001 S
- List of unnumbered minor planets: 2001 T
- List of unnumbered minor planets: 2001 U
- List of unnumbered minor planets: 2001 V–W
- List of unnumbered minor planets: 2001 X–Y

2002

- List of unnumbered minor planets: 2002 A–B
- List of unnumbered minor planets: 2002 C
- List of unnumbered minor planets: 2002 D–F
- List of unnumbered minor planets: 2002 G–K
- List of unnumbered minor planets: 2002 L–O
- List of unnumbered minor planets: 2002 P
- List of unnumbered minor planets: 2002 Q (0–119)
- List of unnumbered minor planets: 2002 Q (120–619)
- List of unnumbered minor planets: 2002 R (0–262)
- List of unnumbered minor planets: 2002 R (263–619)
- List of unnumbered minor planets: 2002 S
- List of unnumbered minor planets: 2002 T (0–319)
- List of unnumbered minor planets: 2002 T (320–619)
- List of unnumbered minor planets: 2002 U–V
- List of unnumbered minor planets: 2002 W–Y

2003

- List of unnumbered minor planets: 2003 A–E
- List of unnumbered minor planets: 2003 F–G
- List of unnumbered minor planets: 2003 H–L
- List of unnumbered minor planets: 2003 M–R
- List of unnumbered minor planets: 2003 S (0–269)
- List of unnumbered minor planets: 2003 S (270–389)
- List of unnumbered minor planets: 2003 S (390–442)
- List of unnumbered minor planets: 2003 S (443–619)
- List of unnumbered minor planets: 2003 T
- List of unnumbered minor planets: 2003 U (0–289)
- List of unnumbered minor planets: 2003 U (290–379)
- List of unnumbered minor planets: 2003 U (380–429)
- List of unnumbered minor planets: 2003 U (430–619)
- List of unnumbered minor planets: 2003 V
- List of unnumbered minor planets: 2003 W (0–199)
- List of unnumbered minor planets: 2003 W (200–619)
- List of unnumbered minor planets: 2003 X–Y

2004

- List of unnumbered minor planets: 2004 A–B
- List of unnumbered minor planets: 2004 C
- List of unnumbered minor planets: 2004 D–E
- List of unnumbered minor planets: 2004 F
- List of unnumbered minor planets: 2004 G–H
- List of unnumbered minor planets: 2004 J–O
- List of unnumbered minor planets: 2004 P–Q
- List of unnumbered minor planets: 2004 R (0–199)
- List of unnumbered minor planets: 2004 R (200–299)
- List of unnumbered minor planets: 2004 R (300–619)
- List of unnumbered minor planets: 2004 S
- List of unnumbered minor planets: 2004 T (0–99)
- List of unnumbered minor planets: 2004 T (100–199)
- List of unnumbered minor planets: 2004 T (200–299)
- List of unnumbered minor planets: 2004 T (300–619)
- List of unnumbered minor planets: 2004 U–V
- List of unnumbered minor planets: 2004 W–X
- List of unnumbered minor planets: 2004 Y

== 2005–present ==
The year of principal provisional designation for most unnumbered minor planets listed on Wikipedia is 2004 or earlier (see § Statistics). Later discoveries are not listed in any of the partial lists (§ 1995–2004) due to their large number and frequent changes. New partial lists may be created in the future, as additional observations ultimately lead to new numberings and to fewer unnumbered bodies.

== See also ==
- Lists of astronomical objects
- List of unnumbered trans-Neptunian objects
