= List of unnumbered minor planets: 1996 =

This is a partial list of unnumbered minor planets for principal provisional designations assigned between 1 January and 31 December 1996. As of May 2026, a total of 58 bodies remain unnumbered for this period. Also see previous and next year.

Near-Earth obj.	MBA (inner)	MBA (outer)	Centaur
Mars-crosser	MBA (middle)	Jupiter trojan	Trans-Neptunian obj.
Unclassified

== A ==
U	Designation	Class	Physical		Observations				Description and notes	Ref
U	Designation	Class	H	D	Opp.	Arc	Last	Used	Description and notes	Ref
7	1996 AP1	APO	24.7	41 m	single	10 days	24 Jan 1996	13	Disc.: Spacewatch	MPC · JPL
1	1996 AE2	APO	20.3	310 m	multiple	1996–2020	03 Feb 2020	329	Disc.: Spacewatch; AMO at MPC	MPC · JPL
1	1996 AR20	CEN	13.38	9.0 km	multiple	1996-2026	26 Jul 2026	50	Disc.: Spacewatch	MPC · JPL
–	1996 AS20	TNO	9.3	77 km	single	13 days	27 Jan 1996	12	Disc.: Spacewatch; LoUTNOs, centaur	MPC · JPL

back to top

== B ==
U	Designation	Class	Physical		Observations				Description and notes	Ref
U	Designation	Class	H	D	Opp.	Arc	Last	Used	Description and notes	Ref
9	1996 BT	APO	23.0	89 m	single	10 days	29 Jan 1996	20	Disc.: Spacewatch	MPC · JPL
0	1996 BA1	AMO	20.55	280 m	multiple	1996–2023	18 Nov 2023	127	Disc.: Spacewatch	MPC · JPL
0	1996 BG1	ATE	23.72	62 m	multiple	1996–2023	17 Dec 2023	48	Disc.: Spacewatch	MPC · JPL

back to top

== F ==
U	Designation	Class	Physical		Observations				Description and notes	Ref
U	Designation	Class	H	D	Opp.	Arc	Last	Used	Description and notes	Ref
9	1996 FT1	APO	24.4	47 m	single	9 days	28 Mar 1996	17	Disc.: Spacewatch	MPC · JPL

back to top

== G ==
U	Designation	Class	Physical		Observations				Description and notes	Ref
U	Designation	Class	H	D	Opp.	Arc	Last	Used	Description and notes	Ref
0	1996 GQ	APO	23.19	211 m	multiple	1996–2023	18 Dec 2023	105	Disc.: Spacewatch; AMO at MPC	MPC · JPL

back to top

== H ==
U	Designation	Class	Physical		Observations				Description and notes	Ref
U	Designation	Class	H	D	Opp.	Arc	Last	Used	Description and notes	Ref
5	1996 HN	AMO	21.5	180 m	single	63 days	21 Jun 1996	34	Disc.: Spacewatch	MPC · JPL
0	1996 HM6	MBA-I	19.46	380 m	multiple	1996–2020	14 Jul 2020	43	Disc.: Spacewatch; Added on 24 August 2020	MPC · JPL

back to top

== J ==
U	Designation	Class	Physical		Observations				Description and notes	Ref
U	Designation	Class	H	D	Opp.	Arc	Last	Used	Description and notes	Ref
4	1996 JA1	APO	21.0	220 m	single	5 days	19 May 1996	344	Disc.: Catalina Station; Potentially hazardous object	MPC · JPL

back to top

== K ==
U	Designation	Class	Physical		Observations				Description and notes	Ref
U	Designation	Class	H	D	Opp.	Arc	Last	Used	Description and notes	Ref
5	1996 KE	AMO	19.2	510 m	single	66 days	18 Jul 1996	80	Disc.: NEAT/GEODSS	MPC · JPL
2	1996 KV1	TNO	7.3	178 km	multiple	1996–2016	29 May 2016	27	Disc.: Mauna Kea Obs. LoUTNOs, cubewano (hot)	MPC · JPL
E	1996 KX1	TNO	8.5	94 km	single	2 days	24 May 1996	8	Disc.: Mauna Kea Obs. LoUTNOs, plutino?	MPC · JPL
E	1996 KY1	TNO	8.0	119 km	single	8 days	24 May 1996	8	Disc.: Mauna Kea Obs. LoUTNOs, plutino?	MPC · JPL
0	1996 KF3	MBA-I	18.25	650 m	multiple	1996–2025	25 Nov 2025	63	Disc.: LINEAR; Added on 17 January 2021; Alt.: 2020 DQ5	MPC · JPL

back to top

== M ==
U	Designation	Class	Physical		Observations				Description and notes	Ref
U	Designation	Class	H	D	Opp.	Arc	Last	Used	Description and notes	Ref
5	1996 MQ	APO	24.5	45 m	single	23 days	17 Jul 1996	72	Disc.: LINEAR; AMO at MPC	MPC · JPL

back to top

== P ==
U	Designation	Class	Physical		Observations				Description and notes	Ref
U	Designation	Class	H	D	Opp.	Arc	Last	Used	Description and notes	Ref
–	1996 PW	TNO	13.9	10 km	multiple	1996–1997	28 Dec 1997	268	Disc.: NEAT/GEODSS; LoUTNOs, damocloid	MPC · JPL
–	1996 PH2	MCA	20.0	300 m	single	25 days	07 Sep 1996	32	Disc.: NEAT/GEODSS	MPC · JPL

back to top

== R ==
U	Designation	Class	Physical		Observations				Description and notes	Ref
U	Designation	Class	H	D	Opp.	Arc	Last	Used	Description and notes	Ref
1	1996 RQ7	MBA-I	19.3	410 m	multiple	1996–2020	11 Oct 2020	49	Disc.: Spacewatch	MPC · JPL
2	1996 RE15	MBA-M	19.55	530 m	multiple	1996-2022	23 Oct 2022	23	Disc.: Spacewatch	MPC · JPL
2	1996 RO15	MBA-M	18.6	1.1 km	multiple	1996–2019	19 Nov 2019	31	Disc.: Spacewatch; Added on 22 July 2020; Alt.: 2014 OW277	MPC · JPL
0	1996 RC17	MBA-I	19.1	500 m	multiple	1996–2023	06 Sep 2023	169	Disc.: Spacewatch; Alt.: 2019 NZ7	MPC · JPL
0	1996 RQ17	MBA-M	18.0	1.4 km	multiple	1996–2018	07 Sep 2018	41	Disc.: Spacewatch; Alt.: 2014 WY599	MPC · JPL
2	1996 RQ20	TNO	6.9	173 km	multiple	1996–2013	07 Oct 2013	53	Disc.: Palomar Obs. LoUTNOs, other TNO, BR-mag: 1.56; taxonomy: IR	MPC · JPL
–	1996 RT20	MCA	19.3	410 m	single	15 days	20 Sep 1996	12	Disc.: Spacewatch	MPC · JPL
1	1996 RU20	MBA-I	19.4	390 m	multiple	1996–2020	15 Oct 2020	35	Disc.: Spacewatch	MPC · JPL
2	1996 RX21	MBA-I	19.2	430 m	multiple	1996–2020	19 Apr 2020	42	Disc.: Spacewatch; Added on 22 July 2020	MPC · JPL
E	1996 RX33	CEN	9.3	77 km	single	13 days	21 Sep 1996	9	Disc.: Spacewatch	MPC · JPL
0	1996 RJ34	MCA	19.59	360 m	multiple	1996–2021	30 Jun 2021	37	Disc.: No observations Added on 19 October 2020	MPC · JPL

back to top

== S ==
U	Designation	Class	Physical		Observations				Description and notes	Ref
U	Designation	Class	H	D	Opp.	Arc	Last	Used	Description and notes	Ref
1	1996 SU5	MBA-I	19.0	470 m	multiple	1996–2017	21 Sep 2017	29	Disc.: Spacewatch; Added on 24 December 2021	MPC · JPL

back to top

== T ==
U	Designation	Class	Physical		Observations				Description and notes	Ref
U	Designation	Class	H	D	Opp.	Arc	Last	Used	Description and notes	Ref
8	1996 TC1	APO	23.9	59 m	single	7 days	11 Oct 1996	14	Disc.: Spacewatch	MPC · JPL
0	1996 TP6	APO	19.98	360 m	multiple	1996–2026	19 Apr 2026	66	Disc.: Spacewatch	MPC · JPL
2	1996 TA9	MCA	19.65	610 m	multiple	1996-2023	18 Dec 2023	58	Disc.: NEAT/GEODSS	MPC · JPL
4	1996 TD9	APO	23.7	65 m	multiple	1996–2016	23 Oct 2016	66	Disc.: NEAT/GEODSS	MPC · JPL
0	1996 TO11	MCA	18.27	710 m	multiple	1996–2026	26 Feb 2026	939	Disc.: Nihondaira Obs.	MPC · JPL6
2	1996 TV27	MBA-M	18.62	1.1 km	multiple	1996-2023	05 Nov 2023	48	Disc.: Spacewatch	MPC · JPL
0	1996 TF28	MBA-M	18.93	490 m	multiple	1996–2021	27 Nov 2021	109	Disc.: Spacewatch	MPC · JPL
2	1996 TJ28	MBA-M	19.08	370 m	multiple	1996-2025	26 Oct 2025	47	Disc.: Spacewatch	MPC · JPL
2	1996 TK28	MBA-M	17.8	1.5 km	multiple	1996–2018	08 Aug 2018	49	Disc.: Spacewatch; Alt.: 2005 UC124	MPC · JPL
0	1996 TU43	MBA-M	18.34	640 m	multiple	1996–2021	31 Oct 2021	25	Disc.: Spacewatch; Added on 24 August 2020	MPC · JPL
1	1996 TG44	MBA-I	18.6	570 m	multiple	1996–2020	12 Nov 2020	66	Disc.: Spacewatch; Alt.: 2010 UJ123	MPC · JPL
1	1996 TY44	MBA-M	18.02	1.1 km	multiple	1996–2023	18 Aug 2023	44	Disc.: Spacewatch; Alt.: 2014 WK169	MPC · JPL
1	1996 TH45	MBA-O	18.27	1.1 km	multiple	1996–2023	18 Aug 2023	39	Disc.: Spacewatch; Added on 24 December 2021	MPC · JPL
0	1996 TM45	MBA-I	19.17	440 m	multiple	1996–2021	10 Nov 2021	61	Disc.: Spacewatch; Added on 5 November 2021	MPC · JPL
1	1996 TE46	MBA-I	18.1	710 m	multiple	1996–2019	02 Nov 2019	50	Disc.: Spacewatch	MPC · JPL
3	1996 TD67	MBA-I	19.2	430 m	multiple	1996–2021	08 Dec 2021	36	Disc.: Spacewatch; Added on 24 December 2021	MPC · JPL

back to top

== V ==
U	Designation	Class	Physical		Observations				Description and notes	Ref
U	Designation	Class	H	D	Opp.	Arc	Last	Used	Description and notes	Ref
0	1996 VB3	APO	22.09	140 m	multiple	1996–2021	02 Dec 2021	200	Disc.: Spacewatch	MPC · JPL
7	1996 VZ4	AMO	24.2	51 m	single	1 day	14 Nov 1996	5	Disc.: Spacewatch	MPC · JPL
0	1996 VE16	MBA-I	18.7	540 m	multiple	1996–2020	02 Feb 2020	42	Disc.: Spacewatch; Added on 22 July 2020; Alt.: 2011 UO74	MPC · JPL
–	1996 VP19	MBA-M	18.5	590 m	single	11 days	18 Nov 1996	9	Disc.: Spacewatch	MPC · JPL
0	1996 VL22	MBA-O	17.80	1.5 km	multiple	1996–2018	04 Dec 2018	49	Disc.: Spacewatch; Added on 11 May 2021; Alt.: 2018 SL18	MPC · JPL
1	1996 VP37	MBA-I	19.08	450 m	multiple	1996–2021	30 Nov 2021	57	Disc.: Spacewatch; Added on 24 December 2021	MPC · JPL

back to top

== X ==
U	Designation	Class	Physical		Observations				Description and notes	Ref
U	Designation	Class	H	D	Opp.	Arc	Last	Used	Description and notes	Ref
1	1996 XR2	MCA	19.2	430 m	multiple	1996–2021	12 Jan 2021	147	Disc.: Spacewatch; Alt.: 2020 QD6	MPC · JPL
0	1996 XZ3	MCA	18.95	450 m	multiple	1996–2025	05 May 2025	365	Disc.: Spacewatch; Alt.: 2013 SO104	MPC · JPL}
9	1996 XZ12	ATE	25.4	30 m	single	3 days	11 Dec 1996	12	Disc.: Spacewatch	MPC · JPL
3	1996 XX14	APO	19.2	510 m	multiple	1996–2005	10 Feb 2005	65	Disc.: Siding Spring	MPC · JPL

back to top
