= Observations of small Solar System bodies =

Subsect of Astronomy

Cumulative number of astrometric observations (in millions) stored in the Minor Planet Center's database per last reported month of each year since 1995. As of December 2019, the database contains 246,034,463 records, 99.5% of which are observations of minor planets.

Observations of minor planets as well as comets and natural satellites of the Solar System are made by astronomical observatories all over the world and reported to the Minor Planet Center (MPC), a service of the International Astronomical Union. The MPC maintains a data base that stores all observations submitted by these registered observatories. An astrometric record consists of the position, brightness and timestamp of an observed object, besides additional information. The database contains more than 200 million records gathered over the past two centuries.

The MPC assigns a 3 digit observatory code for each observatory, also known as 'MPC-' or 'IAU codes'. The code is in the range 000 to Z99 and serves as a unique identifier for the reported observations. The MPC periodically published a revised "List Of Observatory Codes" with newly registered observatories in their Minor Planet Circulars. Over time, the number of astronomical observatories worldwide has been growing constantly and contains 2468 observatory codes as of November 2023.

On numbering, often years later, the MPC determines the discovery among all the reported observations for an object. This does not need to be the earliest dated observation, also see precovery. The date of the selected observation will become the object's discovery date, and the corresponding observing astronomer or facility will become its discoverer. The discovery circumstances are given in the catalog of numbered minor planets.

== Observational record ==
An astrometric observational record includes the position, timestamp, and absolute brightness of an observed object. Typically, an observatory observes an objects at least three times within a short timespan during the same night. The records are then reported together with the individual code of the observatory to the Minor Planet Center. These are then compared to MPC's internal database and a new provisional designation is assigned if no match is found. The observational records are published by the MPC on a weekly basis. Summaries are published in the Minor Planet Circulars several times a year.

=== Examples ===
| Date (UT) | J2000 RA | J2000 Dec | Magn | Location | Ref |
|---|---|---|---|---|---|
| 1980‑03‑21.59633 | 13^{h} 51^{m} 40.18^{s} | −02° 46′ 38.6″ | - | 260 - Siding Spring Observatory-DSS | MPS #15065 |

The example shows the first observational record for the Jupiter trojan (21271) 1996 RF_{33} as found in the lower section of the MPC's corresponding object page. The observation was taken on 21 March 1980 at 14 hours 18 minutes and 43 seconds (1980 03 21.59633). The position of the object is given in the celestial coordinate system as declination (DEC) and right ascension (RA). The observation was taken by the Siding Spring Observatory in Australia and later released by the Digitized Sky Survey (DSS) using the observatory's archived photographic plates with a dedicated IAU code (260). The observation was published in the Minor Planets and Comets Supplement (MPS) on the continual page number 15065 on 21 June 2000.

== Astrometric database ==
MPC's astrometric database contains more than 200 millions entries, split up into 199.9 million minor-planet observations as well as 0.4 million comet- and 0.6 million satellite-observations.

The ceremonial first entry, by date, is the discovery observation of Ceres made by G. Piazzi on 1 January 1801.

Before the end of the 1950s, records were published in a variety of (non-MPC) journals:

Journals formerly publishing observations
| APO | Annales de l'Observatoire de Paris: Observations |
| AN | Astronomische Nachrichten |
| RM | Memoirs of the Royal Astronomical Society |
| HD | Mitteilungen der Landessternwarte Heidelberg |

== Discovery ==
Among the observations of an object, one will be determined by the MPC as the discovering observation and its timestamp as the discovery date. This typically happens years after the first observations when an object is numbered and additional observation have secured the object's orbit sufficiently. While the discovery date is typically defined by the object's first obtained observation, there are many exceptions, as the rules for discovery are intricate and have changed over time. For example, an object needs to be observed several times over (at least) two consecutive nights. As nowadays most discoveries are made by dedicated surveys and observing facilities, and the MPC typically does not give credit to more than three individual astronomers, most discoveries of minor planets are credited to a facility (identified by its observatory code) rather than to individual astronomers.

== See also ==
- List of observatory codes
- List of astronomical observatories
- Space telescope
- Timeline of telescopes, observatories, and observing technology
- Volcano observatory
