= Opposition (astronomy) =

Two objects on opposite sides of the celestial sphere

Diagram of positional astronomy

In positional astronomy, two astronomical objects are said to be in opposition when they are on opposite sides of the celestial sphere, as observed from a given body (usually Earth).

A planet (or asteroid or comet) is said to be "in opposition" or "at opposition" when it is in opposition to the Sun. Because most orbits in the Solar System are nearly coplanar to the ecliptic, this occurs when the Sun, Earth, and the body are configured in an approximately straight line, or syzygy; that is, Earth and the body are in the same direction as seen from the Sun. Opposition occurs only for superior planets (see the diagram).

The instant of opposition is defined as that when the apparent geocentric celestial longitude of the body differs by 180° from the apparent geocentric longitude of the Sun. At that time, a body is:

- in apparent retrograde motion
- visible almost all night – rising around sunset, culminating around midnight, and setting around sunrise
- at the point in its orbit where it is roughly closest to Earth, making it appear larger and brighter
- nearly completely sunlit; the planet shows a full phase, analogous to a full moon
- at the place where the opposition effect increases the reflected light from bodies with unobscured rough surfaces

The Moon, which orbits Earth rather than the Sun, is in approximate opposition to the Sun at full moon. A more exact opposition occasionally occurs with mathematical regularity if the Moon is at its usual sun and Earth-aligning point so that it appears full and happens to be aligning with the ecliptic (Earth's orbital plane) during the descending or ascending phase of its 5° inclined (tilted) orbit, which is more concisely termed at a node of its orbit, in which case, a lunar eclipse occurs. A more exact, shaded form is when a central area of the earth aligns more precisely: a central lunar eclipse, of which there were 14 in the 50 years to 2000, others being penumbral.

The astronomical symbol for opposition is ☍ (U+260D).

Seen from a superior planet, an inferior planet on the opposite side of the Sun is in superior conjunction with the Sun. An inferior conjunction occurs when the two planets align on the same side of the Sun. At inferior conjunction, the superior planet is "in opposition" to the Sun as seen from the inferior planet (see the diagram).

== Average interval between oppositions ==
When two planets are on the same side of the Sun then from the point of view of the interior planet the other planet is in opposition with the Sun. When two planets are on opposite sides of the Sun, there is an opposition from the point of view of the Sun. In either case, the interval between two such occurrences involving the same two planets is not constant because the orbits are not circular and because the planets perturb one another. But the average interval between them can be calculated from the periods of the two planets. The "speed" at which a planet goes around the Sun, in terms of revolutions per time, is given by the inverse of its period, and the speed difference between two planets is the difference between these. Since the time interval between two oppositions is the time it takes for 360° to be covered by that speed difference, the average interval is:

$$\frac 1{|1/p_1-1/p_2|}$$

The following table gives these average intervals, in Julian years (of 365.25 days), for combinations of the nine traditional planets. Since Pluto is in resonance with Neptune the period used is 1.5 times that of Neptune, slightly different from the current value. The interval is then exactly thrice the period of Neptune.

Average interval between oppositions
Planet		Mercury	Venus	Earth	Mars	Jupiter	Saturn	Uranus	Neptune	Pluto
	Period	0.241	0.615	1.000	1.881	11.863	29.447	84.017	164.791	247.187
Mercury	0.241		0.396	0.317	0.276	0.246	0.243	0.242	0.241	0.241
Venus	0.615	0.396		1.599	0.914	0.649	0.628	0.620	0.618	0.617
Earth	1.000	0.317	1.599		2.135	1.092	1.035	1.012	1.006	1.004
Mars	1.881	0.276	0.914	2.135		2.235	2.009	1.924	1.903	1.895
Jupiter	11.863	0.246	0.649	1.092	2.235		19.865	13.813	12.783	12.461
Saturn	29.447	0.243	0.628	1.035	2.009	19.865		45.338	35.855	33.430
Uranus	84.017	0.242	0.620	1.012	1.924	13.813	45.338		171.406	127.277
Neptune	164.791	0.241	0.618	1.006	1.903	12.763	35.855	171.406		494.374
Pluto	247.187	0.241	0.617	1.004	1.895	12.461	33.420	127.277	494.374	

== See also ==
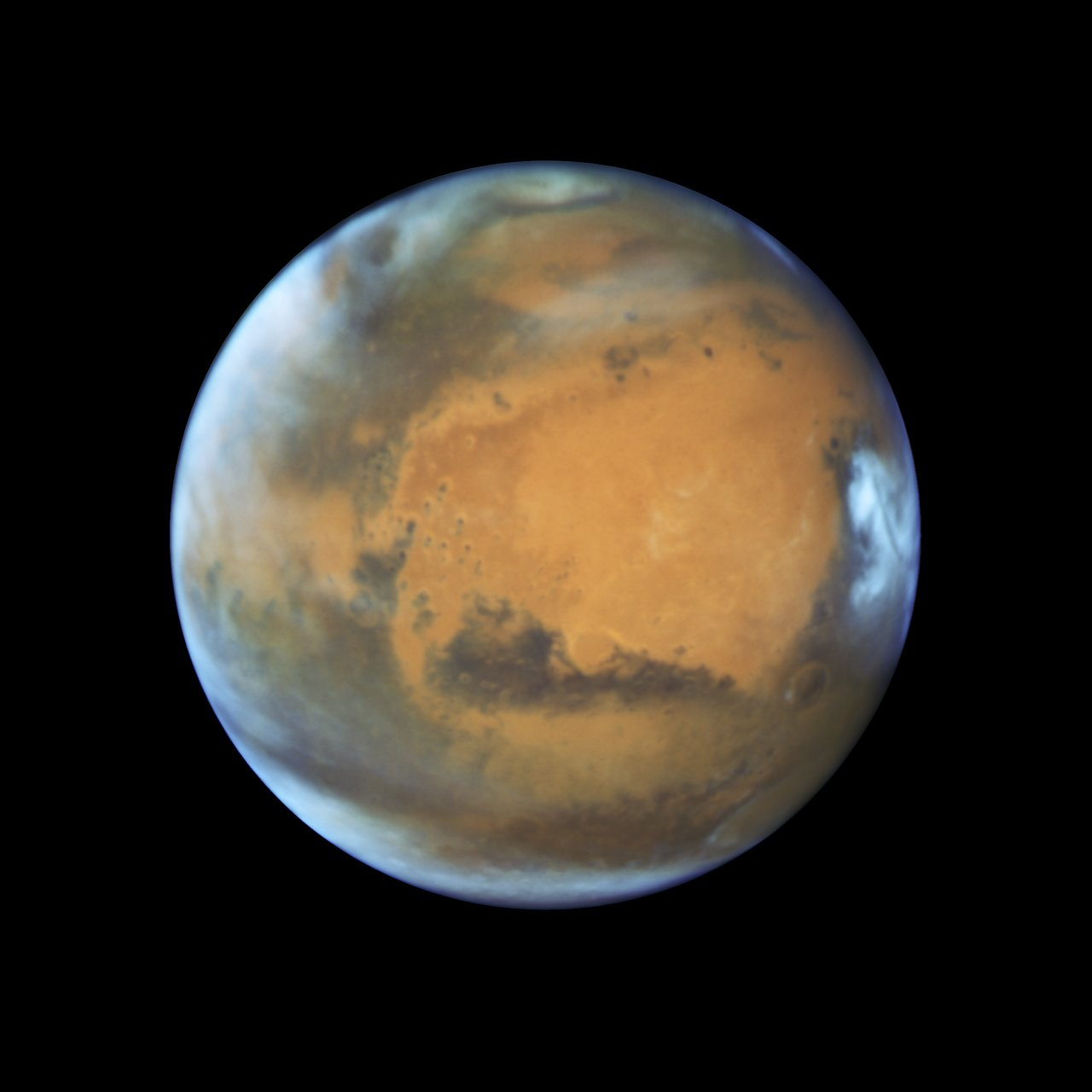
Mars in opposition 2016.

- Astronomical transit
- Conjunction
- Phase angle
- Spherical astronomy
- Syzygy
