= 2016 WF9 =

Near-Earth object

2016 WF_{9}
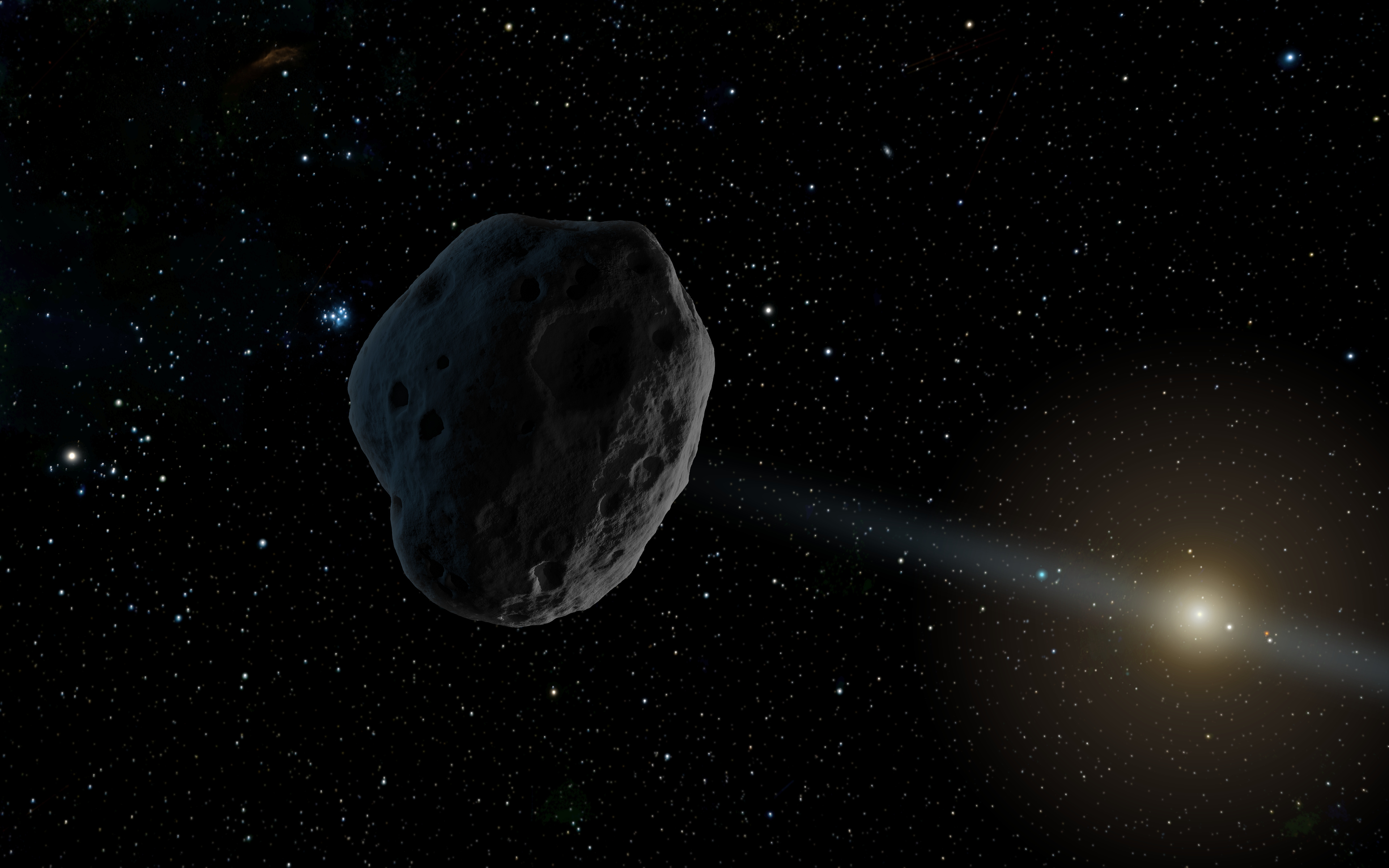
- Artist's rendition of 2016 WF_{9}

Discovery
- Discovered by: NEOWISE
- Discovery site: Earth orbit
- Discovery date: 27 November 2016 (discovery: first observed)

Designations
- Minor planet category: NEO · PHA · Apollo

Orbital characteristics
- Epoch 4 September 2017 (JD 2458000.5)
- Uncertainty parameter 4
- Observation arc: (192 days)
- Aphelion: 4.7614 AU
- Perihelion: 0.9816 AU
- Semi-major axis: 2.8715 AU
- Eccentricity: 0.6582
- Orbital period (sidereal): 4.87 yr (1,777 days)
- Mean anomaly: 43.511°
- Mean motion: 0° 12^{m} 9.36^{s} / day
- Inclination: 14.995°
- Longitude of ascending node: 125.41°
- Argument of perihelion: 342.45°
- Earth MOID: 0.0156 AU (6.1 LD)
- Jupiter MOID: 0.5211 AU
- T_{Jupiter}: 2.893 (comet-like)

Physical characteristics
- Mean diameter: 0.5–1.0 km
- Geometric albedo: <0.05 (dark)
- Absolute magnitude (H): 20.2

2016 WF_{9} is a dark, sub-kilometer asteroid and suspected extinct comet, classified as a near-Earth object and potentially hazardous asteroid of the Apollo group.

== Description ==
2016 WF_{9} is unusually dark for a near-Earth asteroid. It is possibly an extinct comet, but without the comet-like dust and gas cloud. It was first observed on 27 November 2016 by NEOWISE, the asteroid-and-comet-hunting portion of the Wide-Field Infrared Survey Explorer (WISE) mission. According to NEOWISE, this object could have cometary origins, which illustrates the blurry boundary between asteroids and comets. It is speculated that over time, this object has lost the majority of the volatiles on its surface.

2016 WF_{9} is about 0.5–1.0 km (0.3–0.6 mi) across so is one of the larger potentially hazardous asteroid near-Earth object (also see list of largest PHAs).

=== 2017 approach ===
2016 WF_{9} passed Earth on 25 February 2017 at a distance of 0.3407 AU (50,970,000 km; 31,670,000 mi) and is not considered a threat for the foreseeable future. The 2017 approach did not bring it particularly close to Earth. In December 1944 it passed about 0.19 AU (28,000,000 km; 18,000,000 mi) from Earth and in February 2149 it will pass about 0.06 AU (9,000,000 km; 5,600,000 mi) from Earth.

=== Discovery ===
When 2016 WF_{9} was first announced and had a short insignificant 3 day observation arc, it was estimated to have a 7.6 year orbital period. The preliminary orbit was also listed on the JPL Sentry Risk Table, but none of the virtual impact dates were before 2029. As the observation arc became longer and the orbital parameters better constrained, it was removed from the Sentry Risk Table on 20 December 2016. With a 111-day observation arc, it is now known that it has a 4.86 year orbital period and currently stays inside the orbit of Jupiter.

A simulation of 2016 WF_{9}'s dynamics over a period of 100 million days (~274,000 years) found that it had roughly a 60% chance of originating from the outer Solar System as a long-period comet.

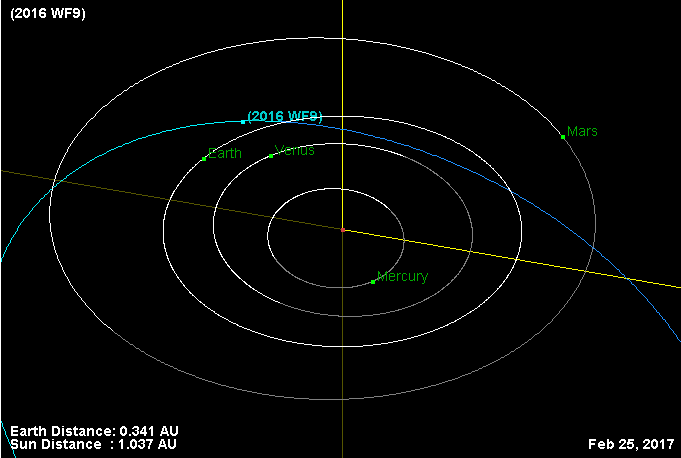
Orbit of 2016 WF_{9} on 25 February 2017, closest approach to Earth.
