= Wide-field Infrared Survey Explorer =

NASA satellite of the Explorer program

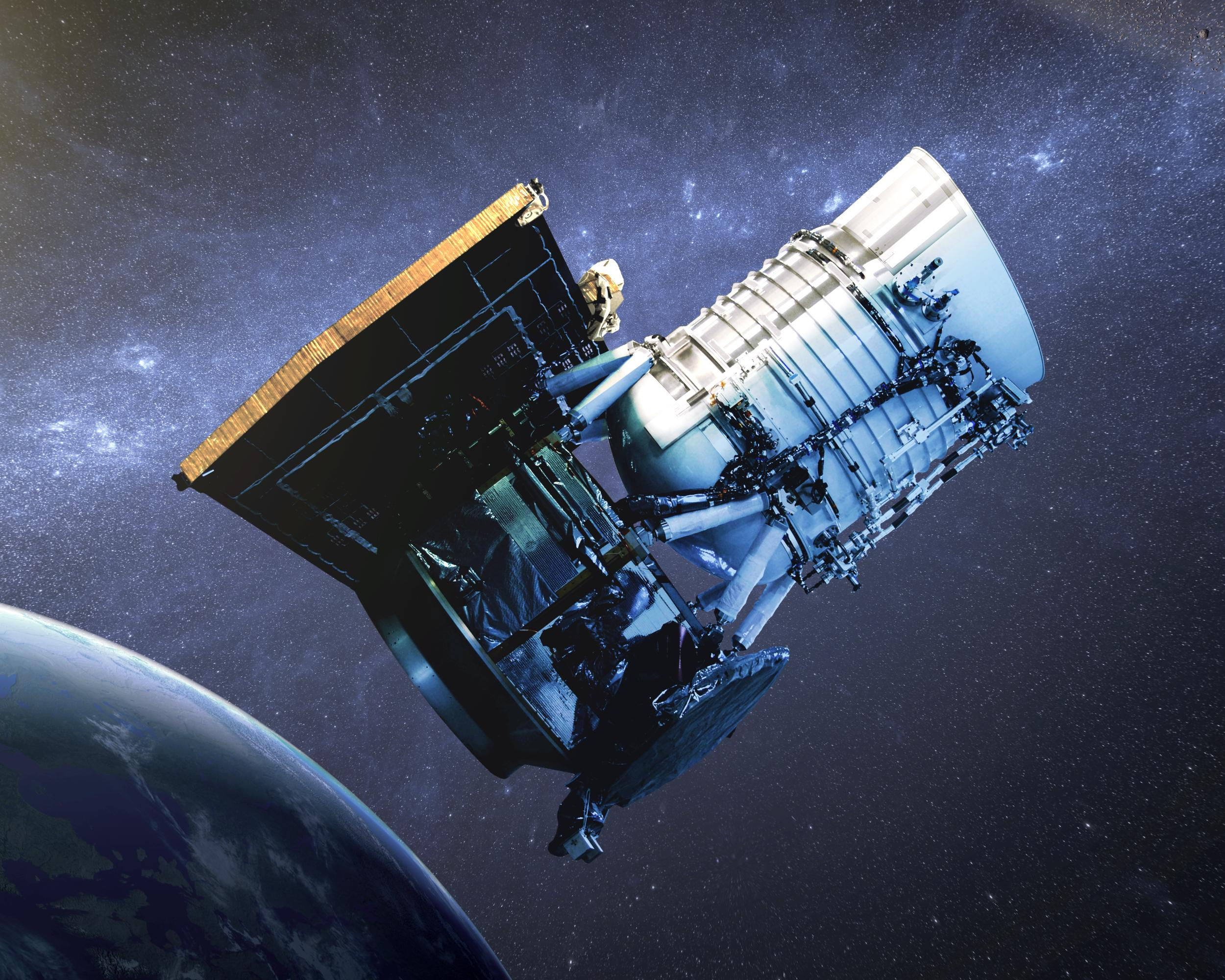
- WISE spacecraft
- Names: Explorer 92; SMEX-6; NEOWISE; Near-Earth Object WISE
- Mission type: Infrared telescope
- Operator: NASA / JPL
- COSPAR ID: 2009-071A
- SATCAT no.: 36119
- Website: www.nasa.gov/wise
- Mission duration: 10 months (planned); 14 years, 10 months and 19 days (achieved)

Spacecraft properties
- Spacecraft: Explorer XCII
- Spacecraft type: Wide-field Infrared Survey Explorer
- Bus: RS-300
- Manufacturer: Ball Aerospace & Technologies
- Launch mass: 661 kg (1,457 lb)
- Payload mass: 347 kg (765 lb)
- Dimensions: 2.85 × 2 × 1.73 m (9 ft 4 in × 6 ft 7 in × 5 ft 8 in)
- Power: 551 watts

Start of mission
- Launch date: 14 December 2009, 14:09:33 UTC
- Rocket: Delta II 7320-10C (Delta 347)
- Launch site: Vandenberg, SLC-2W
- Contractor: United Launch Alliance
- Entered service: 2010

End of mission
- Deactivated: 8 August 2024
- Last contact: 31 July 2024
- Decay date: 2 November 2024, 00:49 UTC

Orbital parameters
- Reference system: Geocentric orbit
- Regime: Sun-synchronous orbit
- Perigee altitude: 488.3 km (303.4 mi)
- Apogee altitude: 494.8 km (307.5 mi)
- Inclination: 97.50°
- Period: 94.45 minutes

Main telescope
- Diameter: 40 cm (16 in)
- Wavelengths: 3.4, 4.6, 12 and 22 μm

Instruments
- Four infrared detectors

Wide-field Infrared Survey Explorer (WISE, observatory code C51, Explorer 92 and MIDEX-6) was a NASA infrared astronomy space telescope in the Explorers Program launched in December 2009. WISE discovered thousands of minor planets and numerous star clusters. Its observations also supported the discovery of the first Y-type brown dwarf and Earth trojan asteroid. WISE performed an all-sky astronomical survey with images in 3.4, 4.6, 12 and 22 μm wavelength range bands, over ten months using a 40 cm (16 in) diameter infrared telescope in Earth orbit.

After its solid hydrogen coolant depleted, it was placed in hibernation mode in February 2011. In 2013, NASA reactivated the WISE telescope to search for near-Earth objects (NEO), such as comets and asteroids, that could collide with Earth.

The reactivation mission was called Near-Earth Object Wide-field Infrared Survey Explorer (NEOWISE). As of August 2023, NEOWISE was 40% through the 20th coverage of the full sky.

Science operations and data processing for WISE and NEOWISE take place at the Infrared Processing and Analysis Center at the California Institute of Technology in Pasadena, California. The WISE All-Sky (WISEA) data, including processed images, source catalogs and raw data, was released to the public on 14 March 2012, and is available at the Infrared Science Archive.

The NEOWISE mission was originally expected to end in early 2025 with the satellite reentering the atmosphere some time after. However, the NEOWISE mission concluded its science survey on 31 July 2024 with the satellite expected to reenter Earth's atmosphere later the same year (2 November 2024). This decision was made due to increased solar activity hastening the decay of its orbit and the lack of an onboard propulsion system for orbital maintenance. The onboard transmitter was turned off on 8 August, marking the formal decommissioning of the spacecraft.

== Mission goals ==
The mission was planned to create infrared images of 99% of the sky, with at least eight images made of each position on the sky in order to increase accuracy. The spacecraft was placed in a 525 km (326 mi), circular, polar, Sun-synchronous orbit for its ten-month mission, during which it has taken 1.5 million images, one every 11 seconds. The satellite orbited above the terminator, its telescope pointing always to the opposite direction to the Earth, except for pointing towards the Moon, which was avoided, and its solar cells towards the Sun. Each image covers a 47 arcminute field of view (FoV), which means a 6 arcsecond resolution. Each area of the sky was scanned at least 10 times at the equator; the poles were scanned at theoretically every revolution due to the overlapping of the images. The produced image library contains data on the local Solar System, the Milky Way, and the more distant Universe. Among the objects WISE studied are asteroids, cool and dim stars such as brown dwarfs, and the most luminous infrared galaxies.

=== Targets within the Solar System ===
WISE was not able to detect Kuiper belt objects, because their temperatures are too low. Pluto is the only Kuiper belt object that was detected. It was able to detect any objects warmer than 70–100 K. A Neptune-sized object would be detectable out to 700 Astronomical unit (AU), a Jupiter mass object out to 1 light year (63,000 AU), where it would still be within the Sun's zone of gravitational control. A larger object of 2–3 Jupiter masses would be visible at a distance of up to 7–10 light years.

At the time of planning, it was estimated that WISE would detect about 300,000 main-belt asteroids, of which approximately 100,000 will be new, and some 700 Near-Earth objects (NEO) including about 300 undiscovered. That translates to about 1000 new main-belt asteroids per day, and 1–3 NEOs per day. The peak of magnitude distribution for NEOs will be about 21–22 V. WISE would detect each typical Solar System object 10–12 times over about 36 hours in intervals of 3 hours.

=== Targets outside the Solar System ===
Star formation, a process where visible light is normally obscured by interstellar dust, is detectable in infrared, since at this wavelength electromagnetic radiation can penetrate the dust. Infrared measurements from the WISE astronomical survey have been particularly effective at unveiling previously undiscovered star clusters. Examples of such embedded star clusters are Camargo 18, Camargo 440, Majaess 101, and Majaess 116. In addition, galaxies of the young Universe and interacting galaxies, where star formation is intensive, are bright in infrared. At infrared wavelengths, interstellar gas clouds are also detectable, as well as proto-planetary discs. The WISE satellite was expected to find at least 1,000 proto-planetary discs.

== Spacecraft ==
The WISE satellite bus was built by Ball Aerospace & Technologies in Boulder, Colorado. The spacecraft was derived from the Ball Aerospace & Technologies RS-300 spacecraft architecture, particularly the NEXTSat spacecraft built for the successful Orbital Express mission launched on 9 March 2007. The flight system had an estimated mass of 560 kg (1,230 lb). The spacecraft was three-axis stabilized, with body-fixed solar arrays. It used a high-gain antenna in the Ku-band to transmit to the ground through the Tracking and Data Relay Satellite System (TDRSS) geostationary system. Ball also performed the testing and flight system integration.

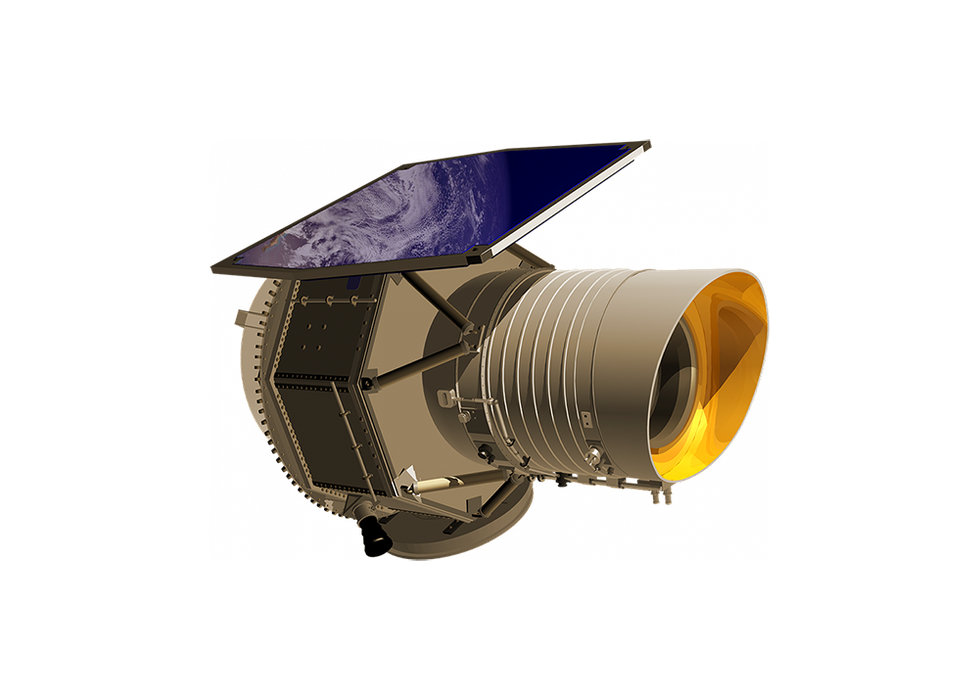
WISE spacecraft

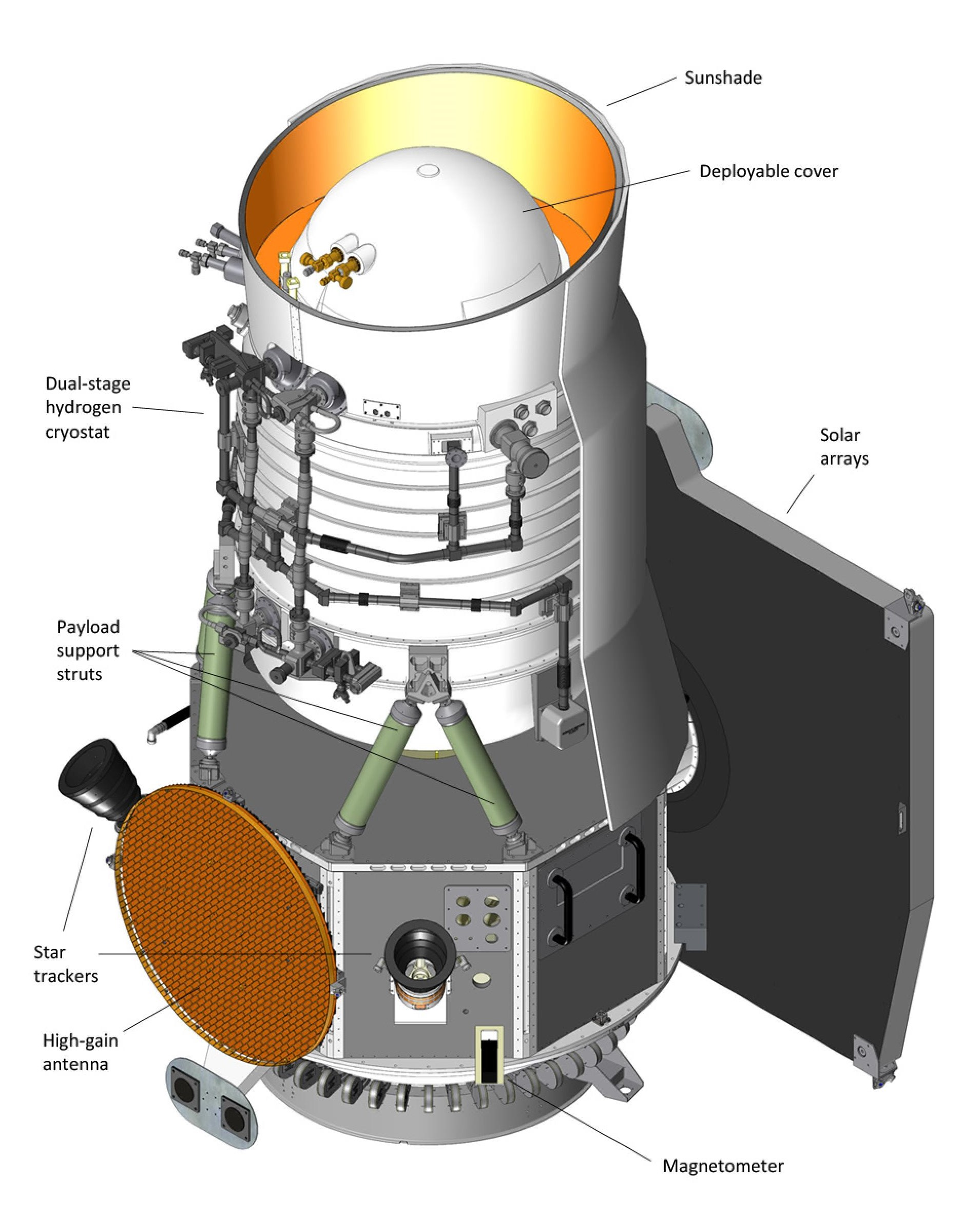
Scheme of the spacecraft

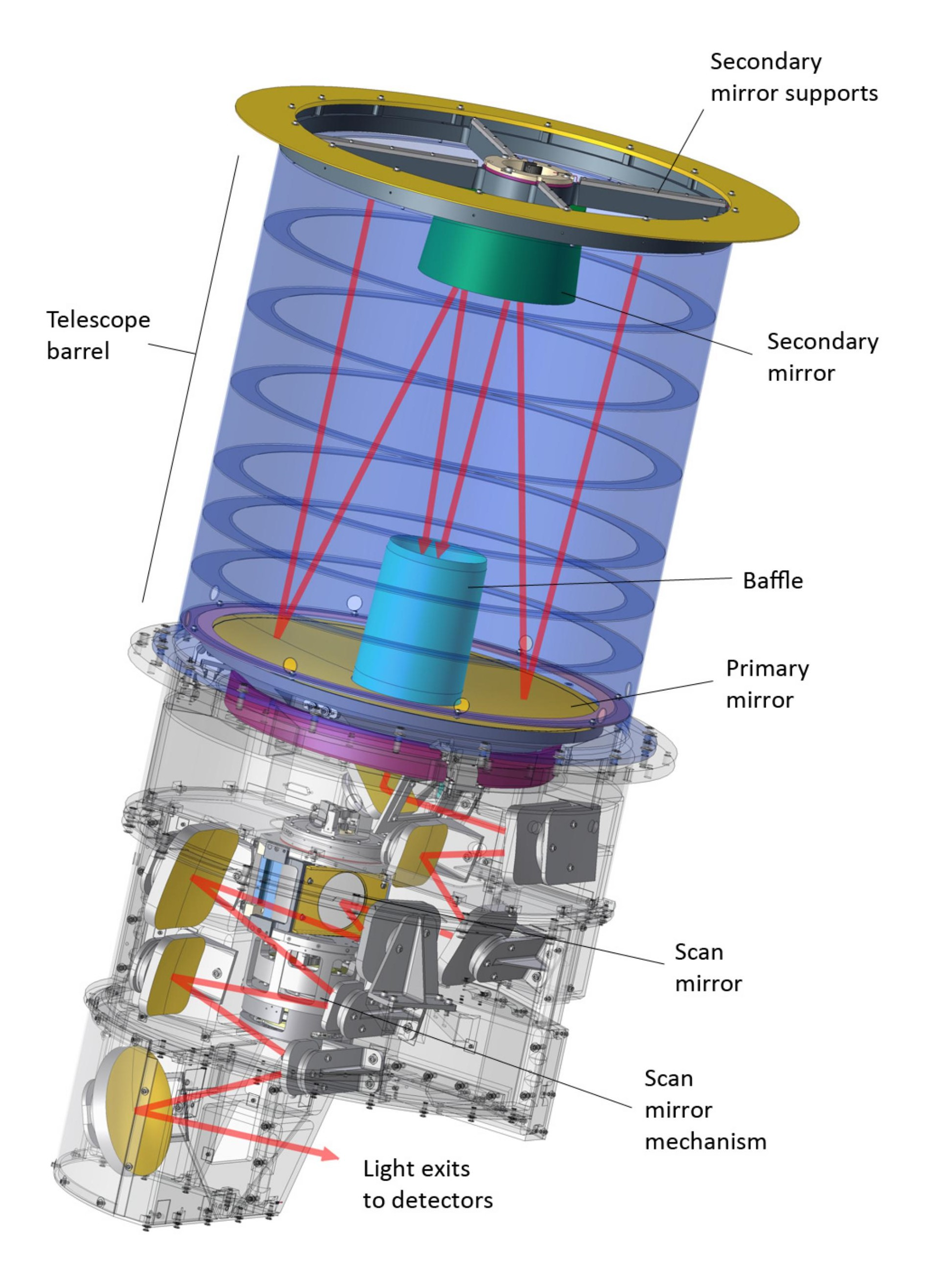
Scheme of the telescope

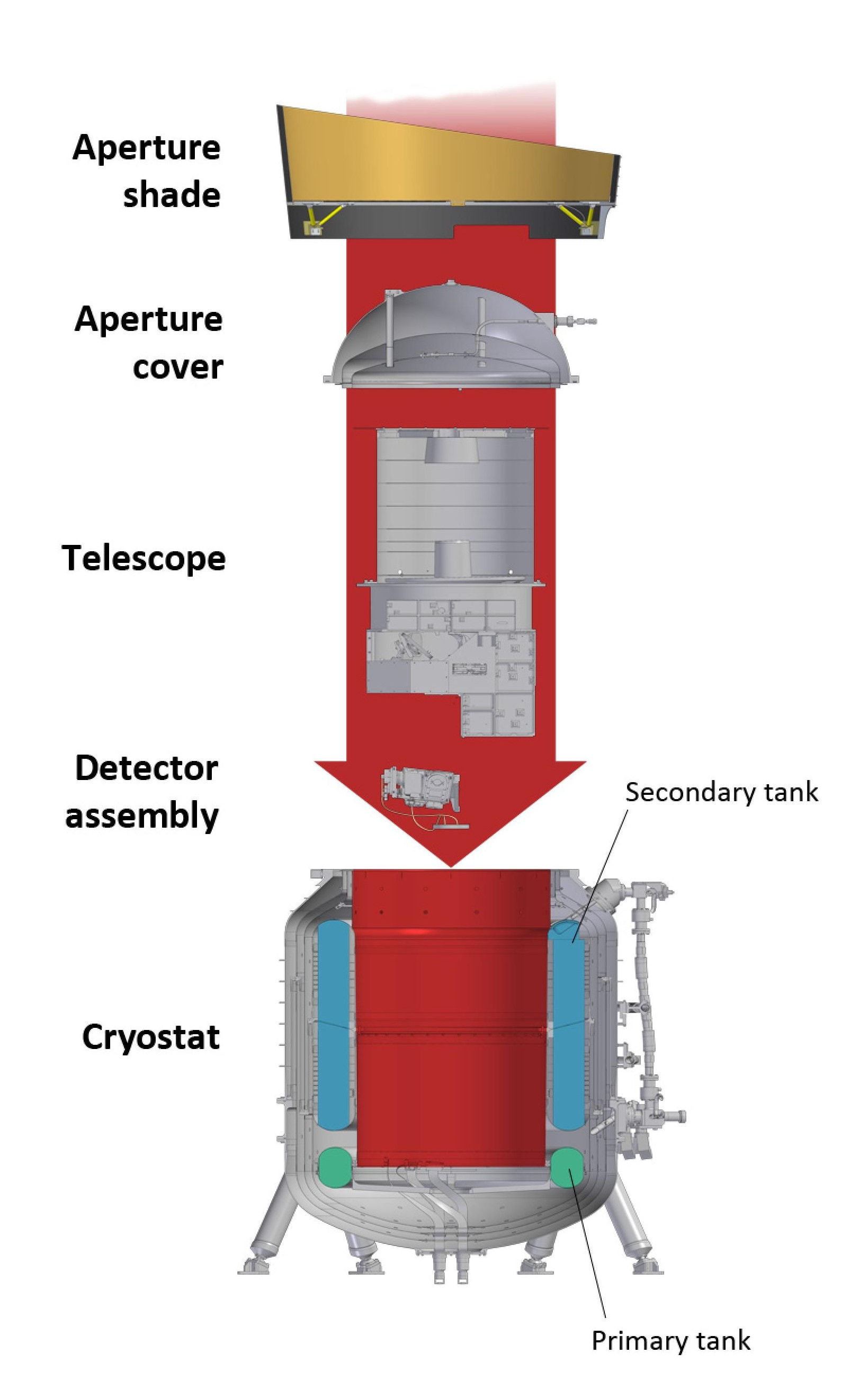
Scheme of the instruments

== Telescope ==
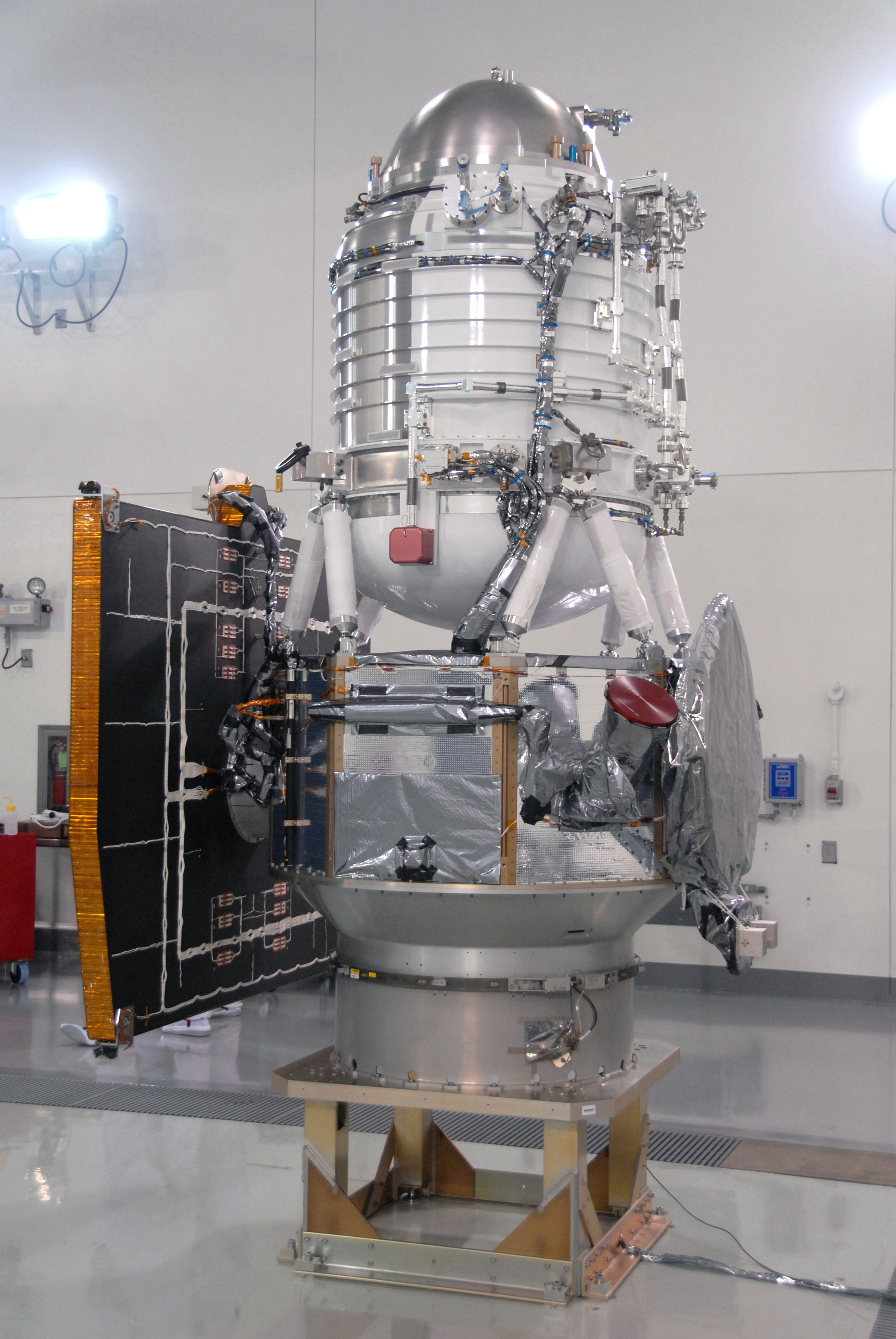
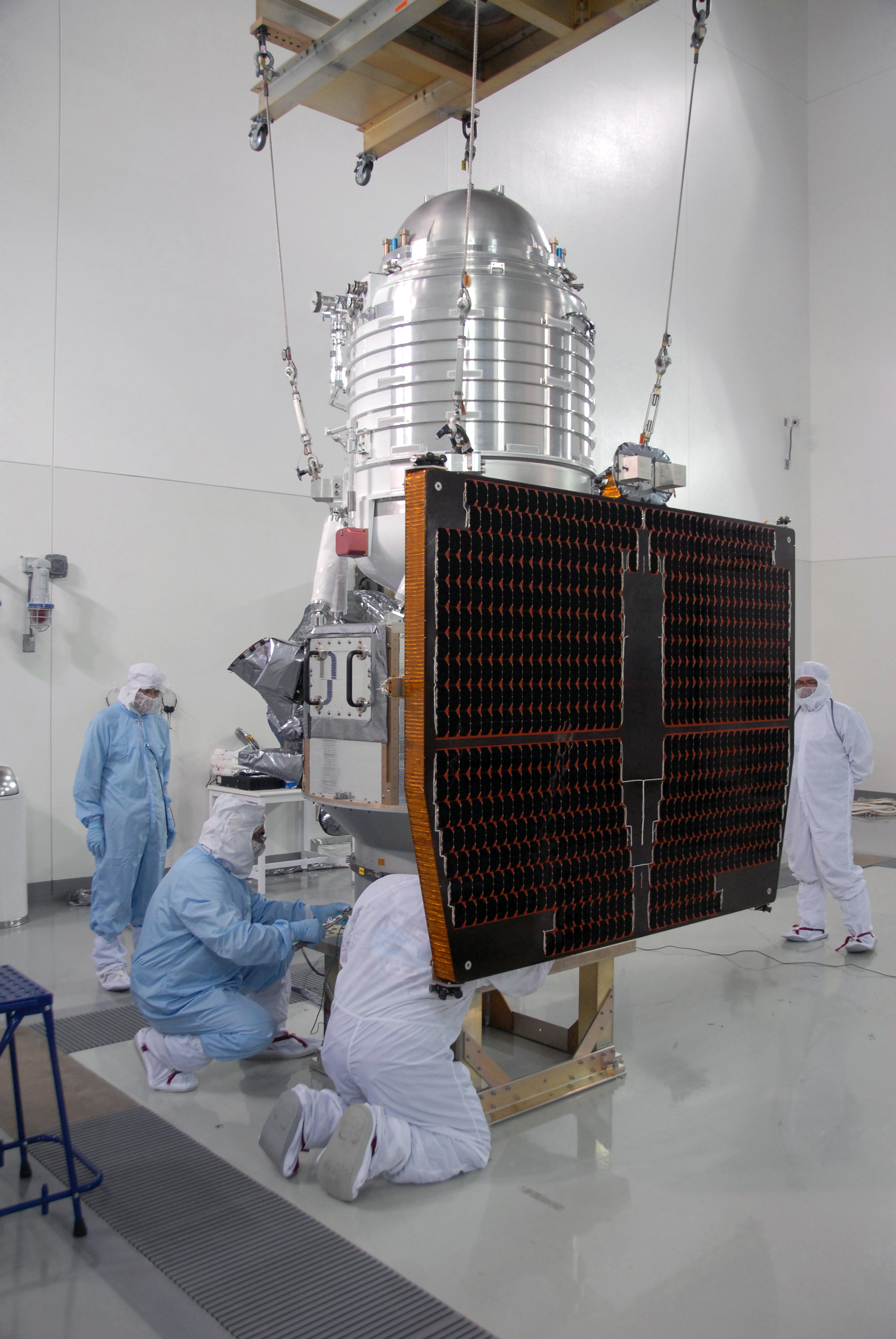
WISE prior to its mission into orbit

Construction of the WISE telescope was divided between Ball Aerospace & Technologies (spacecraft, operations support), SSG Precision Optronics, Inc. (telescope, optics, scan mirror), DRS Technologies and Rockwell International (focal planes), Lockheed Martin (cryostat, cooling for the telescope), and Space Dynamics Laboratory (instruments, electronics, and testing). The program was managed through the Jet Propulsion Laboratory.

The WISE instrument was built by the Space Dynamics Laboratory in Logan, Utah.

== Mission ==
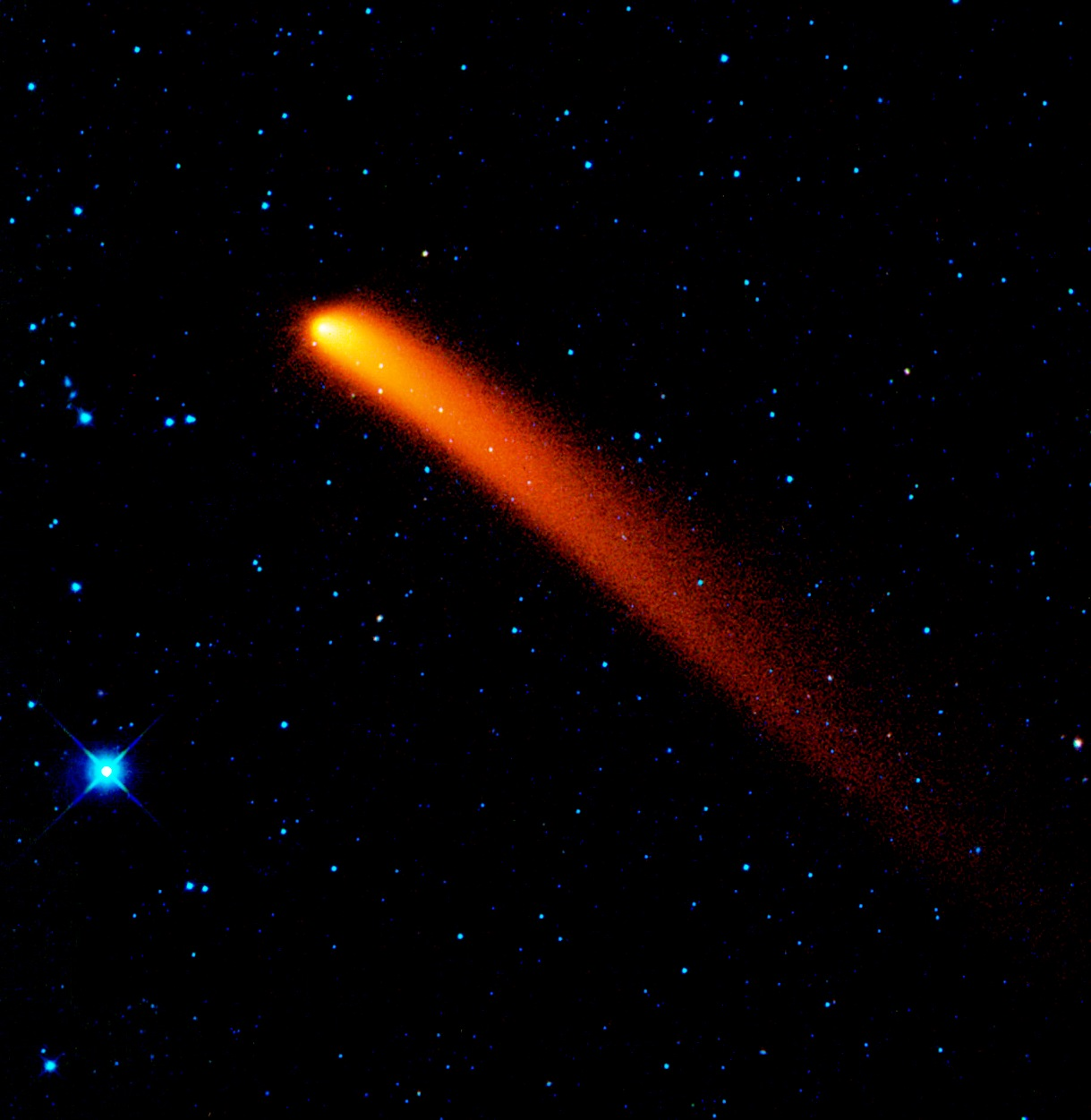
Comet C/2007 Q3 (Siding Spring) in infrared by WISE

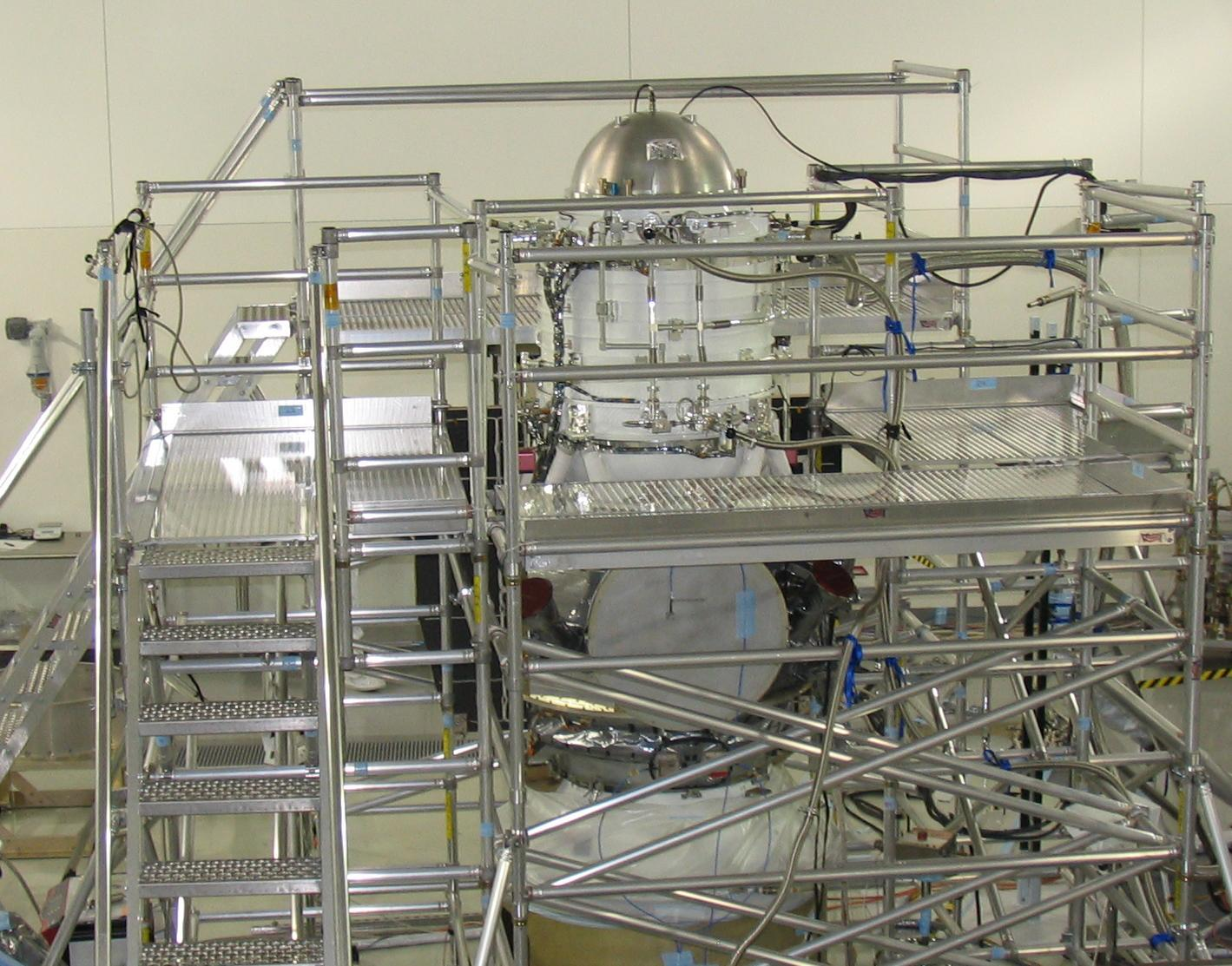
A scaffolding structure built around WISE allows engineers access while its hydrogen coolant is being frozen.

WISE surveyed the sky in four wavelengths of the infrared band, at a very high sensitivity. Its design specified as goals that the full sky atlas of stacked images it produced have 5-sigma sensitivity limits of 120, 160, 650, and 2600 microjanskies (μJy) at 3.3, 4.7, 12, and 23 μm (aka microns). WISE achieved at least 68, 98, 860, and 5400 μJy; 5 sigma sensitivity at 3.4, 4.6, 12, and 22 μm for the WISE All-Sky data release. This is a factor of 1,000 times better sensitivity than the survey completed in 1983 by the IRAS satellite in the 12 and 23 μm bands, and a factor of 500,000 times better than the 1990s survey by the Cosmic Background Explorer (COBE) satellite at 3.3 and 4.7 μm. On the other hand, IRAS could also observe 60 and 100 μm wavelengths.

- Band 1 – 3.4 μm (micrometre) – broad-band sensitivity to stars and galaxies
- Band 2 – 4.6 μm – detect thermal radiation from the internal heat sources of sub-stellar objects like brown dwarfs
- Band 3 – 12 μm – detect thermal radiation from asteroids
- Band 4 – 22 μm – sensitivity to dust in star-forming regions (material with temperatures of 70–100 Kelvin)

The primary mission lasted 10 months: one month for checkout, six months for a full-sky survey, then an additional three months of survey until the cryogenic coolant (which kept the instruments at 17 K) ran out. The partial second survey pass facilitated the study of changes (e.g. orbital movement) in observed objects.

=== Congressional hearing – November 2007 ===
On 8 November 2007, the House Committee on Science and Technology's Subcommittee on Space and Aeronautics held a hearing to examine the status of NASA's Near-Earth Object (NEO) survey program. The prospect of using WISE was proposed by NASA officials.

NASA officials told Committee staff that NASA planned to use WISE to detect near-Earth objects in addition to performing its science goals. It was projected that WISE could detect 400 NEOs (or roughly 2% of the estimated NEO population of interest) within its one-year mission.

=== Results ===
By October 2010, over 33,500 new asteroids and comets were discovered, and nearly 154,000 Solar System objects had been observed by WISE.

Discovery of an ultra-cool brown dwarf, WISEPC J045853.90+643451.9, about 10~30 light years away from Earth, was announced in late 2010 based on early data. In July 2011, it was announced that WISE had discovered the first Earth trojan asteroid, 2010 TK7. Also, the third-closest star system, Luhman 16.

As of May 2018, WISE / NEOWISE had also discovered 290 near-Earth objects and comets (see section below).

== Project milestones ==
The WISE mission is led by Edward L. Wright of the University of California, Los Angeles. The mission has a long history under Wright's efforts and was first funded by NASA in 1999 as a candidate for a NASA Medium-class Explorer (MIDEX) mission under the name Next Generation Sky Survey (NGSS). The history of the program from 1999 to date is briefly summarized as follows:

- January 1999 – NGSS is one of five missions selected for a Phase A study, with an expected selection in late 1999 of two of these five missions for construction and launch, one in 2003 and another in 2004. Mission cost is estimated at US$139 million at this time.
- March 1999 – WIRE infrared telescope spacecraft fails within hours of reaching orbit.
- October 1999 – Winners of MIDEX study are awarded, and NGSS is not selected.
- October 2001 – NGSS proposal is re-submitted to NASA as a MIDEX mission.
- April 2002 – NGSS proposal is accepted by the NASA Explorer office to proceed as one of four MIDEX programs for a Pre-Phase A study.
- December 2002 – NGSS changes its name to Wide-field Infrared Survey Explorer (WISE).
- March 2003 – NASA releases a press release announcing WISE has been selected for an Extended Phase-A study, leading to a decision in 2004 on whether to proceed with the development of the mission.
- April 2003 – Ball Aerospace & Technologies is selected as the spacecraft provider for the WISE mission.
- April 2004 – WISE is selected as NASA's next MIDEX mission. WISE's cost is estimated at US$208 million at this time.
- November 2004 – NASA selects the Space Dynamics Laboratory at Utah State University to build the telescope for WISE.
- October 2006 – WISE is confirmed for development by NASA and authorized to proceed with development. Mission cost at this time is estimated to be US$300 million.
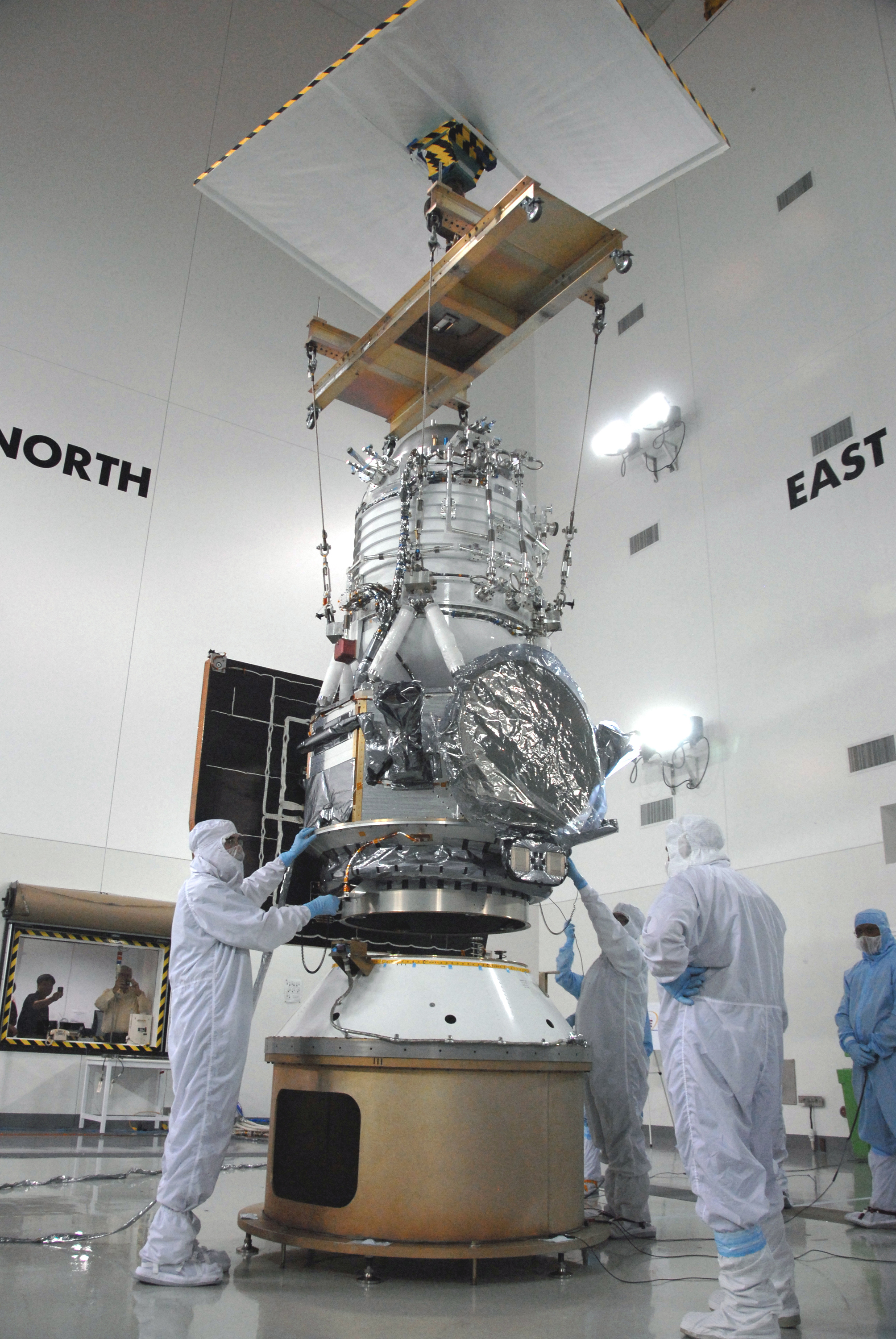
WISE being connected to its adapter for launch

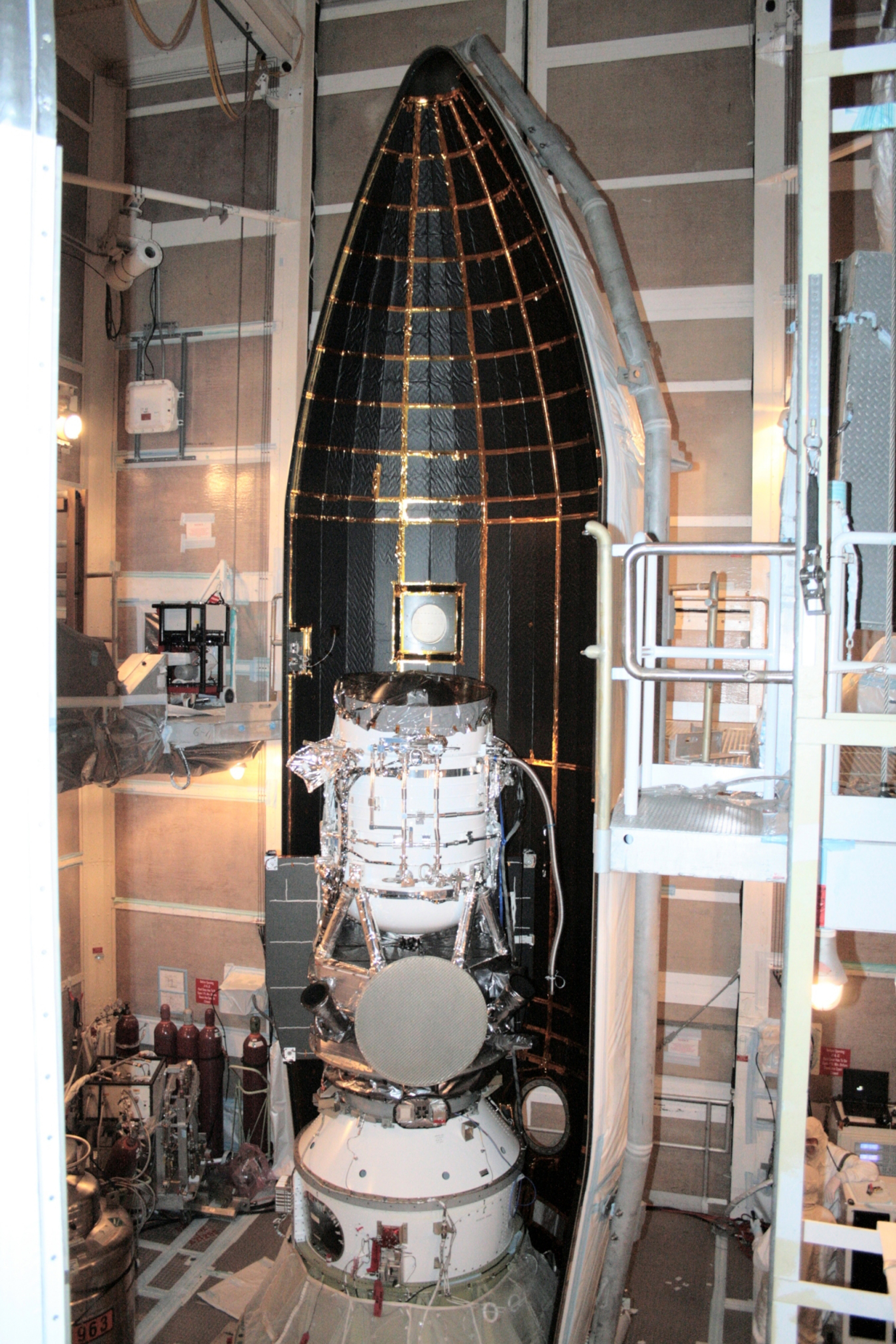
WISE during the payload fairing installation

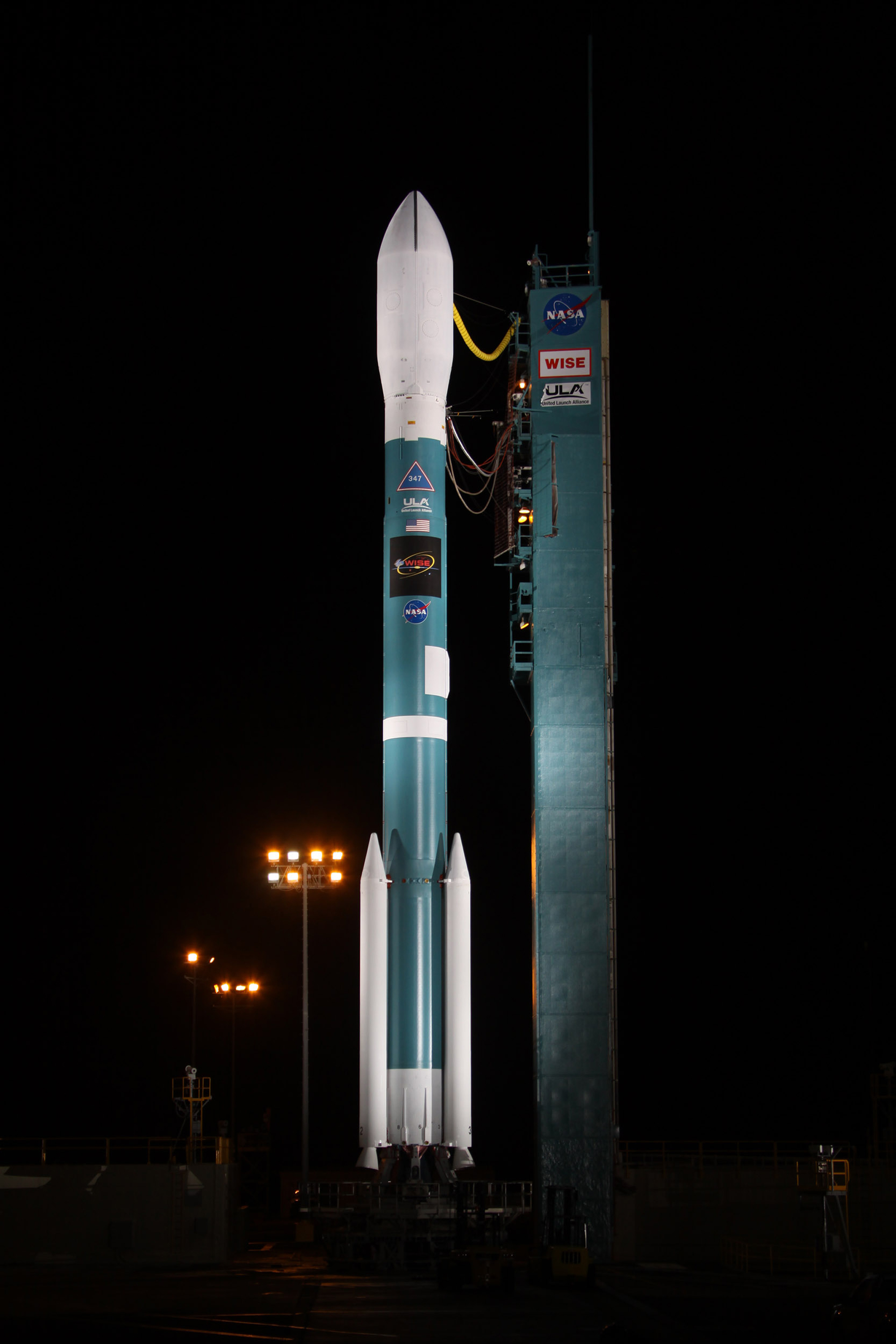
Delta II launch vehicle with WISE aboard

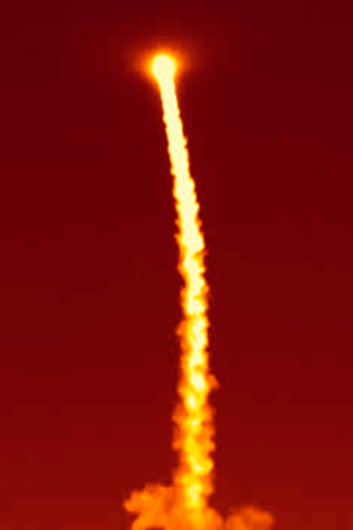
Infrared image of WISE's launch from Vandenberg AFB

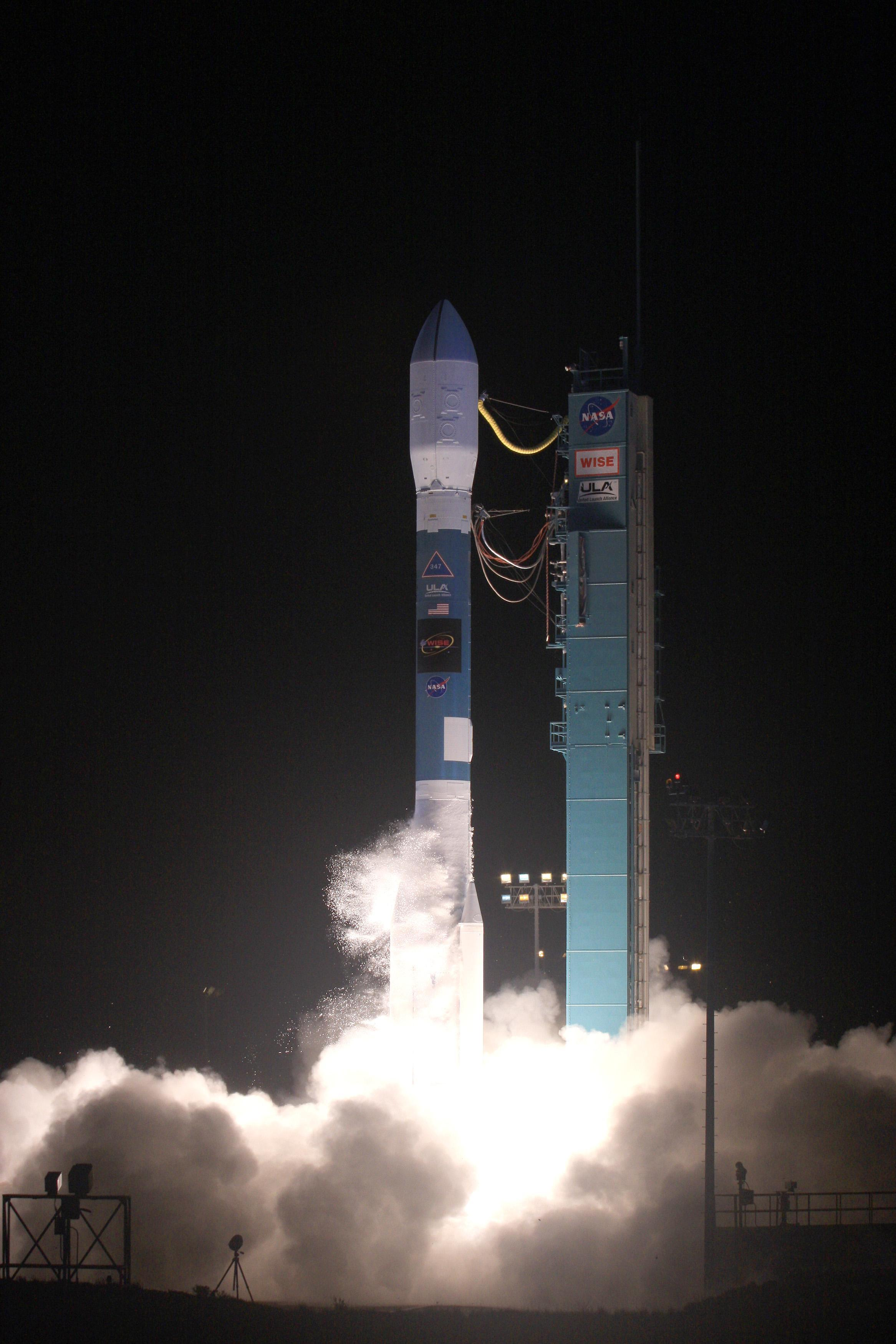
Launch of WISE
- 14 December 2009 – WISE successfully launched from Vandenberg Air Force Base, California.
- 29 December 2009 – WISE successfully jettisoned instrument cover.
- 6 January 2010 – WISE first light image released.
- 14 January 2010 – WISE begins its regular four wavelength survey scheduled for nine months duration. It is expected to cover 99% of the sky with overlapping images in the first 6 months and continuing with a second pass until the hydrogen coolant is exhausted about three months later.
- 25 January 2010 – WISE detects a never-before-seen near Earth asteroid, designated 2010 AB78.
- 11 February 2010 – WISE detects a previously unknown comet, designated P/2010 B2 (WISE).
- 25 February 2010 – WISE website reports it has surveyed over 25% of the sky to a depth of 7 overlapping image frames.
- 10 April 2010 – WISE website reports it has surveyed over 50% of the sky to a depth of 7 overlapping image frames.
- 26 May 2010 – WISE website reports it has surveyed over 75% of the sky to a depth of 7 overlapping image frames.
- 16 July 2010 – Press release announces that 100% sky coverage will be completed on 17 July 2010. About half of the sky will be mapped again before the instrument's block of solid hydrogen coolant sublimes and is exhausted.
- October 2010 – WISE hydrogen coolant runs out. Start of NASA Planetary Division funded NEOWISE mission.
- January 2011 – Entire sky surveyed to an image density of at least 16+ frames (i.e. second scan of sky completed).

Hibernation

- 17 February 2011 – WISE Spacecraft transmitter turned off at 20:00 UTC by principal investigator Ned Wright. The spacecraft will remain in hibernation without ground contacts awaiting possible future use.

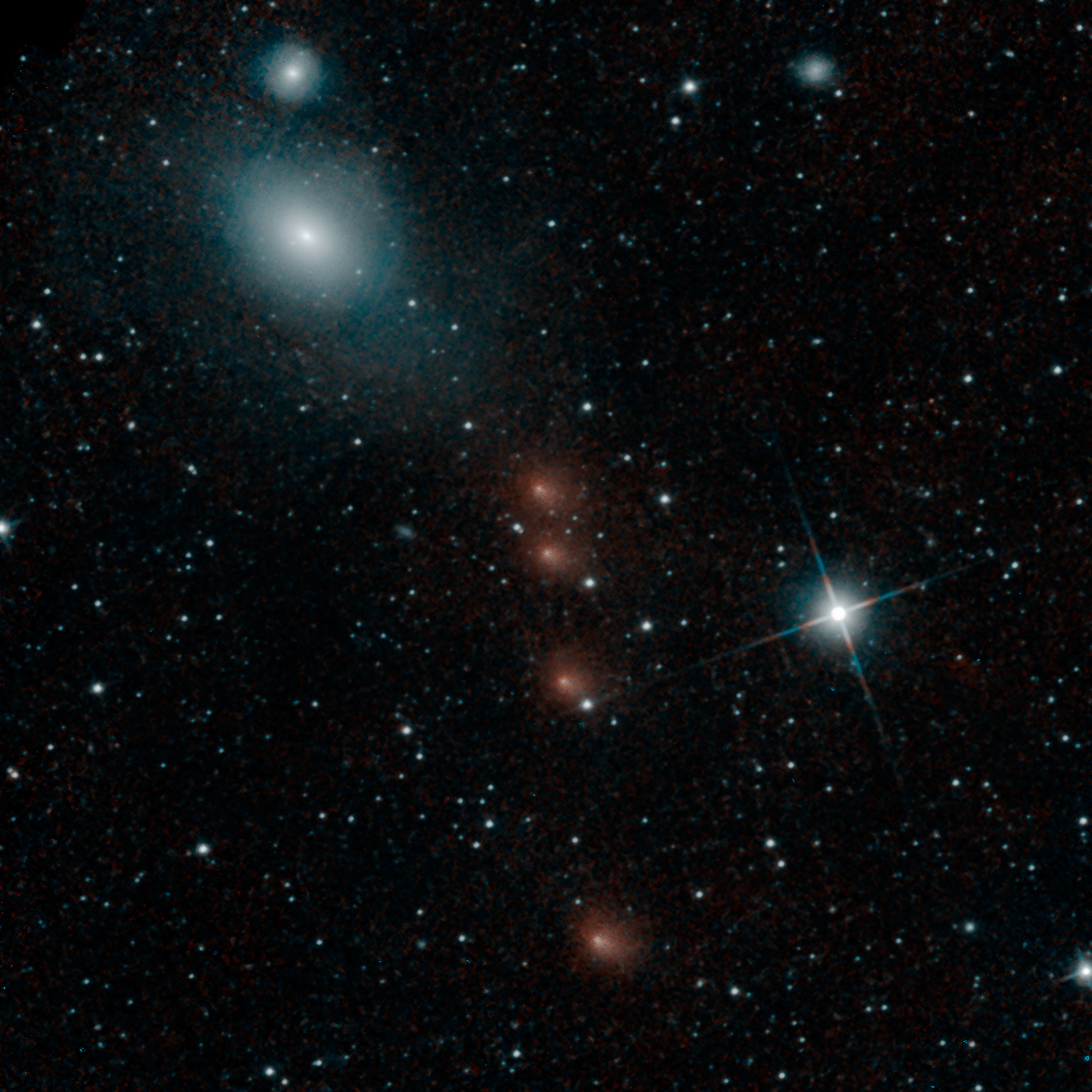
Comet C/2013 A1 Siding Spring multiple exposure – four separate images superimposed against the same background stars (NEOWISE; 28 July 2014). (The four reddish smudges, center; the blue/white ovals top left are galaxies.)

- 14 April 2011 – Preliminary release of data covering 57% of the sky as seen by WISE.
- 27 July 2011 – First Earth trojan asteroid discovered from WISE data.
- 23 August 2011 – WISE confirms the existence of a new class of brown dwarf, the Y dwarf. Some of these stars appear to have temperatures less than 300 K, close to room temperature at about 25 °C. Y dwarfs show ammonia absorption, in addition to methane and water absorption bands displayed by T dwarfs.
- 14 March 2012 – Release of the WISE All-Sky data to the scientific community.
- 29 August 2012 – WISE reveals millions of black-holes.
- 20 September 2012 – WISE was successfully contacted to check its status.
- 21 August 2013 – NASA announced it would recommission WISE with a new mission to search for asteroids.

Reactivation

- 19 December 2013 – NASA releases a new image taken by the reactivated WISE telescope, following an extended cooling down phase. The revived NeoWise mission is underway and collecting data.
- 7 March 2014 – NASA reports that WISE, after an exhaustive survey, has not been able to uncover any evidence of "planet X", a hypothesized planet within the Solar System.
- 26 April 2014 – The Penn State Center for Exoplanets and Habitable Worlds reports that WISE has found the coldest known brown dwarf, between −48 °C and −13 °C, 7.2 light years away from the Sun.
- 21 May 2015 – NASA reports the discovery of WISE J224607.57-052635.0, the most luminous known galaxy in the Universe.

== History ==
Animation of WISE's orbit around Earth. Earth is not shown.

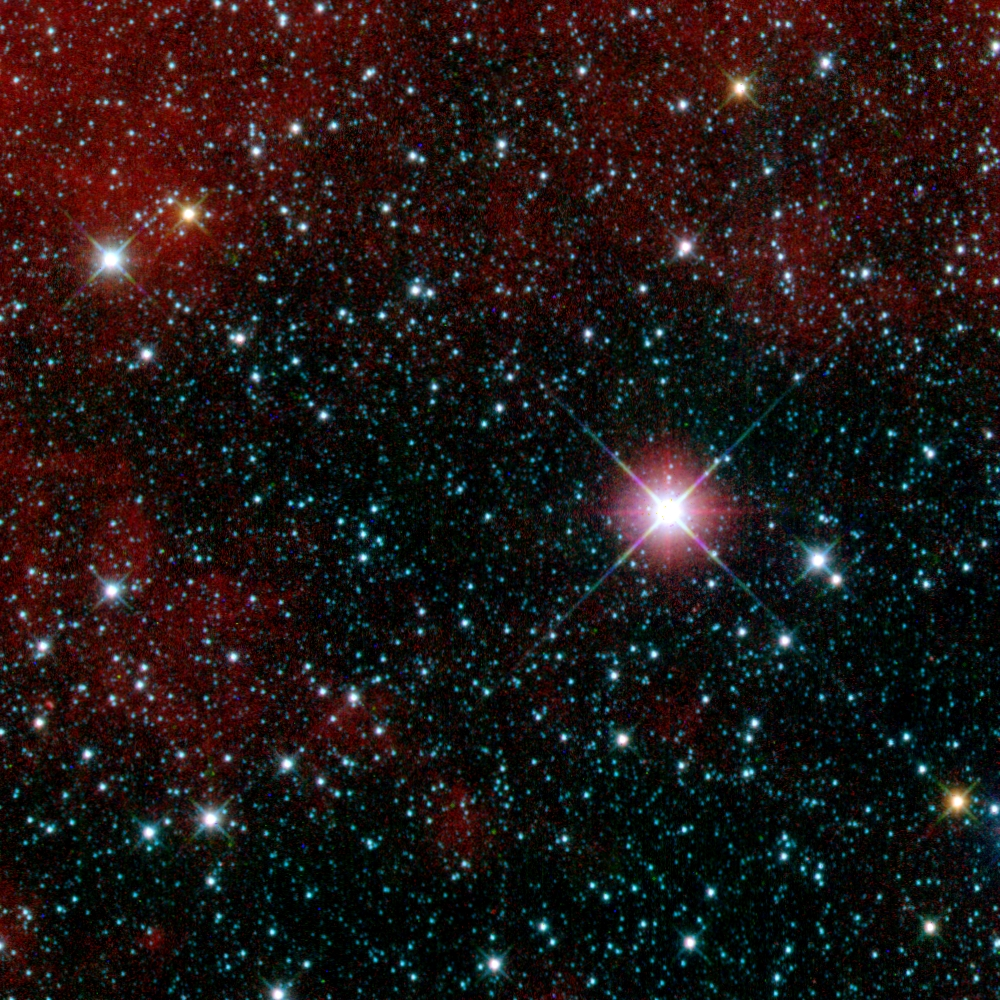
This first light image is a false color infrared image of the sky in the constellation Carina.

=== Launch ===
The launch of the Delta II launch vehicle carrying the WISE spacecraft was originally scheduled for 11 December 2009. This attempt was scrubbed to correct a problem with a booster rocket steering engine. The launch was then rescheduled for 14 December 2009. The second attempt launched on time at 14:09:33 UTC from Vandenberg Air Force Base in California. The launch vehicle successfully placed the WISE spacecraft into the planned polar orbit at an altitude of 525 km (326 mi) above the Earth.

WISE avoided the problem that affected Wide Field Infrared Explorer (WIRE), which failed within hours of reaching orbit in March 1999. In addition, WISE was 1,000 times more sensitive than prior surveys such as IRAS, AKARI, and COBE's DIRBE.

=== "Cold" mission ===
A month-long checkout after launch found all spacecraft systems functioning normally and both the low- and high-rate data links to the operations center working properly. The instrument cover was successfully jettisoned on 29 December 2009. A first light image was released on 6 January 2010: an eight-second exposure in the constellation Carina showing infrared light in false color from three of WISE's four wavelength bands: Blue, green and red corresponding to 3.4, 4.6, and 12 μm, respectively. On 14 January 2010, the WISE mission started its official sky survey.

The WISE group's bid for continued funding for an extended "warm mission" scored low by a NASA review board, in part because of a lack of outside groups publishing on WISE data. Such a mission would have allowed use of the 3.4 and 4.6 μm detectors after the last of cryo-coolant had been exhausted, with the goal of completing a second sky survey to detect additional objects and obtain parallax data on putative brown dwarf stars. NASA extended the mission in October 2010 to search for near-Earth objects (NEO).

By October 2010, over 33,500 new asteroids and comets were discovered, and over 154,000 Solar System objects were observed by WISE. While active it found dozens of previously unknown asteroids every day. In total, it captured more than 2.7 million images during its primary mission.

=== NEOWISE (pre-hibernation) ===
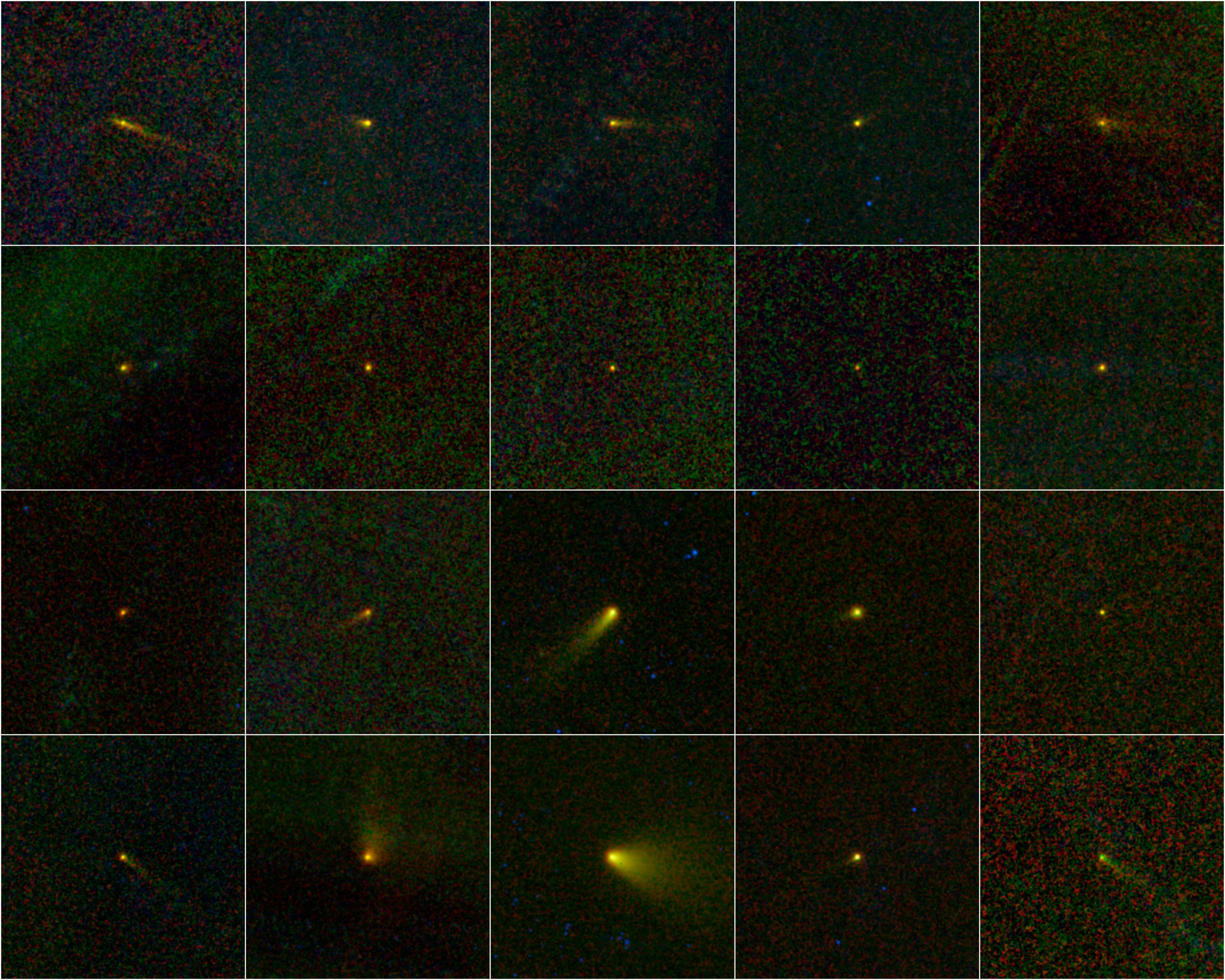
Some of the comets discovered during the pre-hibernation NEOWISE

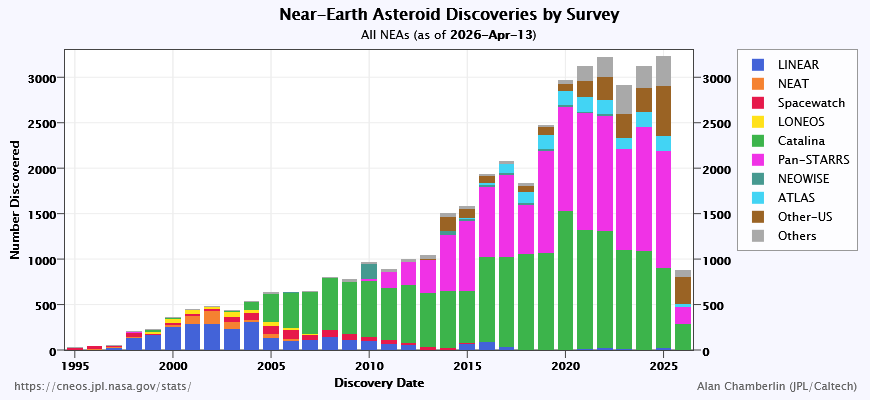
Number of near-Earth objects detected by various projects: LINEAR; NEAT; Spacewatch; LONEOS / CSS; Pan-STARRS; NEOWISE others

In October 2010, NASA extended the mission by one month with a program called Near-Earth Object WISE (NEOWISE). Due to its success, the program was extended a further three months. The focus was to look for asteroids and comets close to Earth orbit, using the remaining post-cryogenic detection capability (two of four detectors on WISE work without cryogenic). In February 2011, NASA announced that NEOWISE had discovered many new objects in the Solar System, including twenty comets. During its primary and extended missions, the spacecraft delivered characterizations of 158,000 minor planets, including more than 35,000 newly discovered objects.

=== Hibernation and recommissioning ===
After completing a full scan of the asteroid belt for the NEOWISE mission, the spacecraft was put into hibernation on 1 February 2011. The spacecraft was briefly contacted to check its status on 20 September 2012.

On 21 August 2013, NASA announced it would recommission NEOWISE to continue its search for near-Earth objects (NEO) and potentially dangerous asteroids. It would additionally search for asteroids that a robotic spacecraft could intercept and redirect to orbit the Moon. The extended mission would be for three years at a cost of US$5 million per year, and was brought about in part due to calls for NASA to step up asteroid detection after the Chelyabinsk meteor exploded over Russia in February 2013.

NEOWISE was successfully taken out of hibernation in September 2013. With its coolant depleted, the spacecraft's temperature was reduced from 200 K (−73 °C; −100 °F)—a relatively high temperature resulting from its hibernation—to an operating temperature of 75 K (−198.2 °C; −324.7 °F) by having the telescope stare into deep space. Its instruments were then re-calibrated, and the first post-hibernation photograph was taken on 19 December 2013.

=== NEOWISE (post-hibernation) ===
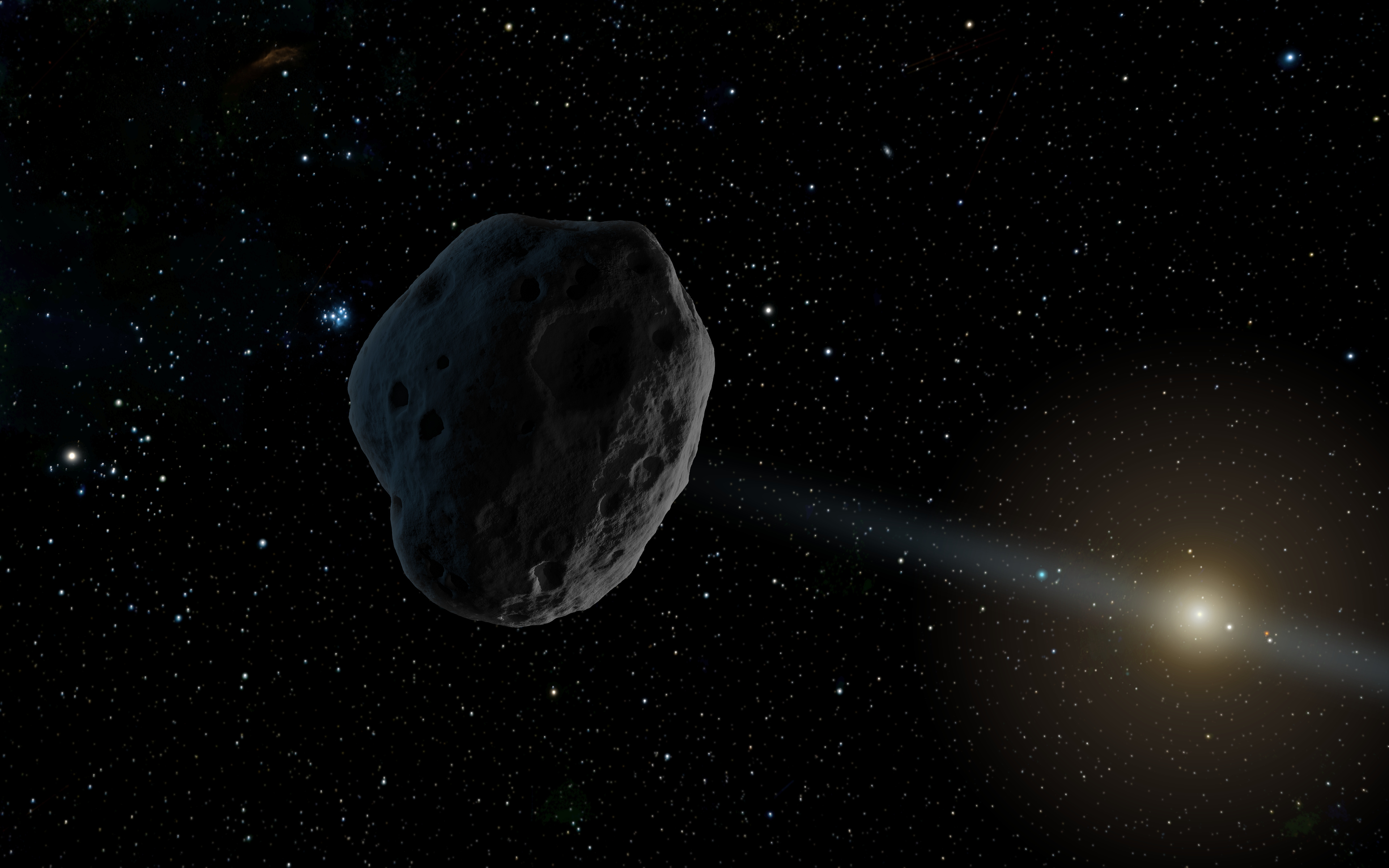
Concept art for 2016 WF9, discovered by WISE under the NEOWISE mission

First four years of NEOWISE data starting in December 2013 to December 2017. Green dots represent near-Earth objects. Gray dots represent all other asteroids which are mainly in the main asteroid belt between Mars and Jupiter. Yellow squares represent comets. White dots are asteroids in view of NEOWISE.

The post-hibernation NEOWISE mission was anticipated to discover 150 previously unknown near-Earth objects and to learn more about the characteristics of 2,000 known asteroids. Few objects smaller than 100 m (330 ft) in diameter were detected by NEOWISE's automated detection software, known as the WISE Moving Object Processing Software (WMOPS), because it requires five or more detections to be reported. The average albedo of asteroids larger than 100 m (330 ft) discovered by NEOWISE is 0.14.

The telescope was turned on again in 2013, and by December 2013 the telescope had cooled down sufficiently to be able to resume observations. Between then and May 2017, the telescope made almost 640,000 detections of over 26,000 previously known objects including asteroids and comets. In addition, it discovered 416 new objects and about a quarter of those were near-Earth objects classification.

As of July 2024, WISE / NEOWISE statistics lists a total of 399 near-Earth objects (NEOs), including 2016 WF9 and C/2016 U1, discovered by the spacecraft:

- 365 NEAs (subset of NEOs)
- 66 PHAs (subset of NEAs)
- 34 comets

Of the 365 near-Earth asteroids (NEAs), 66 of them are considered potentially hazardous asteroids (PHAs), a subset of the much larger family of NEOs, but particularly more likely to hit Earth and cause significant destruction. NEOs can be divided into NECs (comets only) and NEAs (asteroids only), and further into subcategories such as Atira asteroids, Aten asteroids, Apollo asteroids, Amor asteroids and the potentially hazardous asteroids (PHAs).

NEOWISE has provided an estimate of the size of over 1,850 near-Earth objects. NEOWISE mission was extended for two more years (1 July 2021 – 30 June 2023).

As of June 2021 NEOWISE's replacement, the next-generation NEO Surveyor, is scheduled to launch in 2028, and will greatly expand on what humans have learned, and continue to learn, from NEOWISE.

"As of August 2023 NEOWISE is 40% through the 20th coverage of the full sky since the start of the Reactivation mission."

=== End of mission ===
On 13 December 2023, the Jet Propulsion Laboratory (JPL), announced that the satellite would enter a low orbit causing it to be unusable by early 2025. Increased solar activity as the sun approaches solar maximum during Solar cycle 25 was expected to increase atmospheric drag causing orbital decay. The satellite was expected to subsequently reenter the earth's atmosphere. On 8 August 2024, the Jet Propulsion Laboratory updated its estimate of orbital decay to sometime in late 2024 and announced that NEOWISE's science survey had ended on 31 July. NEOWISE entered and burnt up in the Earth's atmosphere at 8:49 p.m. EDT on 1 November 2024.

== Data releases ==
On 14 April 2011, a preliminary release of WISE data was made public, covering 57% of the sky observed by the spacecraft. On 14 March 2012, a new atlas and catalog of the entire infrared sky as imaged by WISE was released to the astronomic community. On 31 July 2012, NEOWISE Post-Cryo Preliminary Data was released. A release called AllWISE, combining all data, was released on 13 November 2013. NEOWISE data is released annually.

The WISE data include diameter estimates of intermediate precision, better than from an assumed albedo but not nearly as precise as good direct measurements, can be obtained from the combination of reflected light and thermal infrared emission, using a thermal model of the asteroid to estimate both its diameter and its albedo. In May 2016, technologist Nathan Myhrvold questioned the precision of the diameters and claimed systemic errors arising from the spacecraft's design. The original version of his criticism itself faced criticism for its methodology and did not pass peer review, but a revised version was subsequently published. The same year, an analysis of 100 asteroids by an independent group of astronomers gave results consistent with the original WISE analysis.

=== unWISE and CatWISE ===
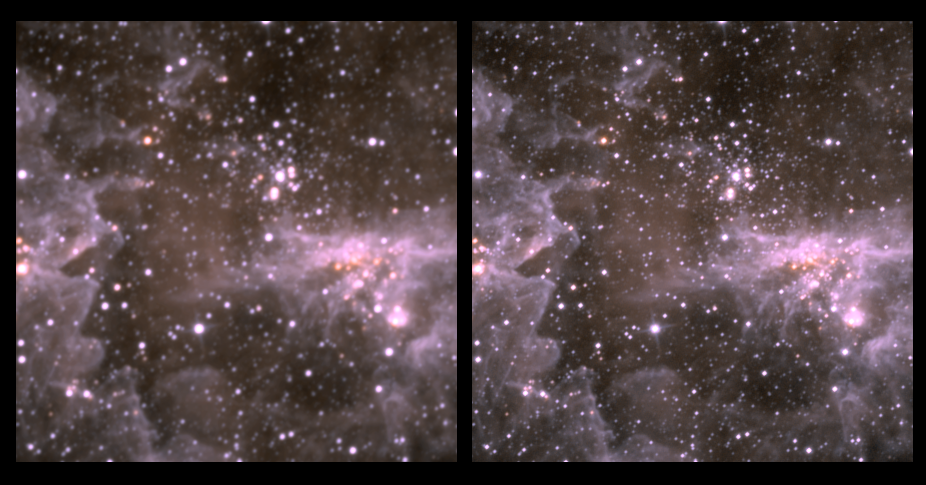
Comparison between the Atlas images of Allwise (left) and the coadds of unWISE (right), using IC 1590 as an example

The Allwise co-added images were intentionally blurred, which is optimal for detecting isolated point sources. This has the disadvantage that many sources are not detected in crowded regions. The unofficial, unblurred coadds of the WISE imaging (unWISE) creates sharp images and masks defects and transients. unWISE coadded images can be searched by coordinates on the unWISE website. unWISE images are used for the citizen science projects Disk Detective and Backyard Worlds.

In 2019, a preliminary catalog was released. The catalog is called CatWISE. This catalog combines the WISE and NEOWISE data and provides photometry at 3.4 and 4.6 μm. It uses the unWISE images and the Allwise pipeline to detect sources. CatWISE includes fainter sources and far more accurate measurement of the motion of objects. The catalog is used to extend the number of discovered brown dwarfs, especially the cold and faint Y dwarfs. CatWISE is led by Jet Propulsion Laboratory (JPL), California Institute of Technology, with funding from NASA's Astrophysics Data Analysis Program. The CatWISE preliminary catalog can be accessed through Infrared Science Archive (IRSA).

== Discovered objects ==
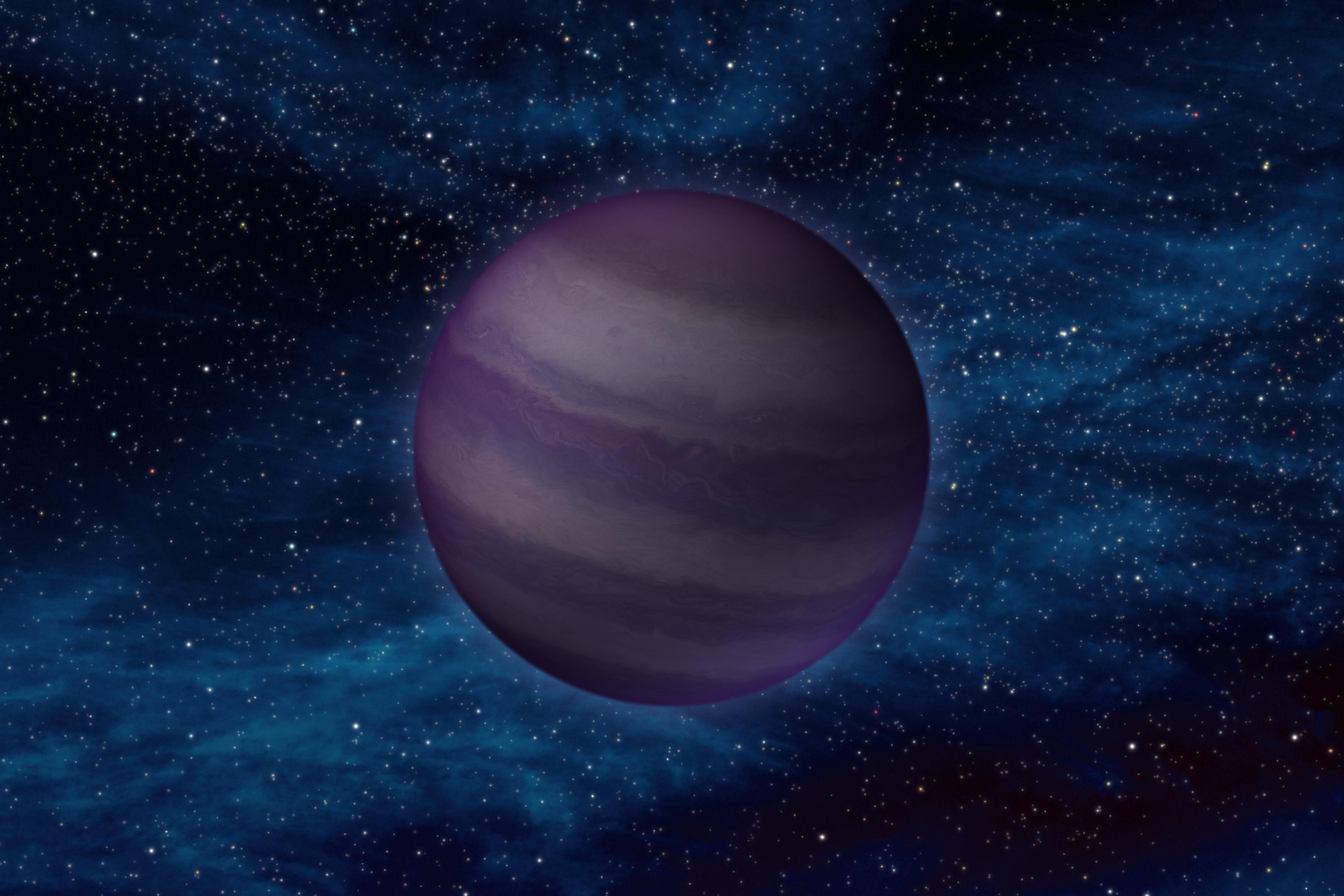
WISE discovered the first Y dwarf (artist concept)

In addition to numerous comets and minor planets, WISE and NEOWISE discovered many brown dwarfs, some just a few light years from the solar system; the first Earth trojan; and the most luminous galaxies in the universe.

=== Nearby stars ===
Nearby stars discovered using WISE within 30 light years:

| Object | ly | Spectral type | Constellation | Right ascension | Declination |
|---|---|---|---|---|---|
| WISEA J1540–5101 | 17.4 | M7 | Norma | 15^{h} 40^{m} 43.537^{s} | −51° 01′ 35.968″ |
| WISE J0720−0846 | 22.2 | M9.5+T5.5 | Monoceros | 07^{h} 20^{m} 03.254^{s} | −08° 46′ 49.90″ |

=== Brown dwarfs ===
The nearest brown dwarfs discovered by WISE within 20 light-years include:

| Object | ly | Spectral type | Constellation | Right ascension | Declination |
|---|---|---|---|---|---|
| Luhman 16 | 6.5 | L8 + T1 | Vela | 10^{h} 49^{m} 15.57^{s} | −53° 19′ 06″ |
| WISE 0855−0714 | 7.3 | Y | Hydra | 8^{h} 55^{m} 10.83^{s} | −7° 14′ 22.5″ |
| WISE 1639-6847 | 15.5 | Y0pec | Triangulum Australe | 16^{h} 39^{m} 40.83^{s} | −68° 47′ 38.6″ |
| WISE J0521+1025 | 16 | T7.5 | Orion | 05^{h} 21^{m} 26.349^{s} | 10° 25′ 27.41″ |
| WISE 1506+7027 | 16.9 | T6 | Ursa Minor | 15^{h} 06^{m} 49.89^{s} | 70° 27′ 36.23″ |
| WISE 0350−5658 | 18 | Y1 | Reticulum | 03^{h} 50^{m} 00.32^{s} | −56° 58′ 30.2″ |
| WISE 1741+2553 | 18 | T9 | Hercules | 17^{h} 41^{m} 24.22^{s} | 25° 53′ 18.96″ |
| WISE 1541−2250 | 19 | Y0.5 | Libra | 15^{h} 41^{m} 51.57^{s} | −22° 50′ 25.03″ |

Before the discovery of Luhman 16 in 2013, WISE 1506+7027 at a distance of 11.1+2.3
−1.3 light-years was suspected to be closest brown dwarf on the list of nearest stars (also see § Map with nearby WISE stars).

=== Directly-imaged exoplanets ===
Directly imaged exoplanets first detected with WISE. See Definition of exoplanets: IAU working definition as of 2018 requires M_{planet} ≤ 13 M_{J} and M_{planet}/M_{central} < 0.04006. M_{min} and M_{max} are the lower and upper mass limit of the planet in Jupiter masses.

| Host name | Planet name | distance to earth (ly) | V-mag host star (mag) | projected separation (AU) | Mass planet (Mjup) | Discovery year | Note and reference | Planet according to IAU working definition |
|---|---|---|---|---|---|---|---|---|
| L 34-26 | WISEPA J075108.79-763449.6 (COCONUTS-2b) | 36 | 11.3 | 6471 | 4.4-7.8 | 2011/2021 | first discovered with WISE in 2011, but planet status was established in 2021 by taking the listed proper motion of the planet and matching it with the Gaia proper motion of the star | Mmin=4.4<13 M_{max}=7.8<13 M_{max}/M_{central}=0.02<0.04 |
| BD+60 1417 | CWISER J124332.12+600126.2 (BD+60 1417 b) | 144 | 9.4 | 1662 | 10-20 | 2021 | Only the minimum mass is within the IAU working definition | M_{min}=10<13 M_{max}=20>13 M_{max}/M_{central}=0.019<0.04 |
| GJ 900 | CW2335+0142 | 68 | 9.5 | 12000 | 10.5 | 2024 | | M_{planet}=10.5<13 M_{planet}/M_{central}=0.009<0.04 |
| 2MASS J05581644–4501559 | CWISE J055816.67-450233.4 (0558 B) | 88 | 14.9 | 1043 | 6-12 | 2024 | | M_{max}=12<13 M_{max}/M_{central}=? |

=== Disks and young stars ===
The sensitivity of WISE in the infrared enabled the discovery of disk around young stars and old white dwarf systems. These discoveries usually require a combination of optical, near infrared and WISE or Spitzer mid-infrared observations. Examples are the red dwarf WISE J080822.18-644357.3, the brown dwarf WISEA J120037.79-784508.3 and the white dwarf LSPM J0207+3331. The NASA citizen science project Disk Detective is using WISE data. Additionally researchers used NEOWISE to discover erupting young stellar objects.

=== Nebulae ===
Researchers discovered a few nebulae using WISE. Such as the type Iax remnant Pa 30. Nebulae around the massive B-type stars BD+60° 2668 and ALS 19653, an obscured shell around the Wolf–Rayet star WR 35 and a halo around the Helix Nebula, a planetary nebula were also discovered with WISE.

=== Extragalactic discoveries ===
Active galactic nuclei (AGN) can be identified from their mid-infrared color. One work used for example a combination of Gaia and unWISE data to identify AGNs. Luminous infrared galaxies can be detected in the infrared. One study used SDSS and WISE to identify such galaxies. NEOWISE observed the entire sky for more than 10 years and can be used to find transient events. Some of these discovered transients are Tidal Disruption Events (TDE) in galaxies and infrared detection of supernovae similar to SN 2010jl.

=== Minor planets ===
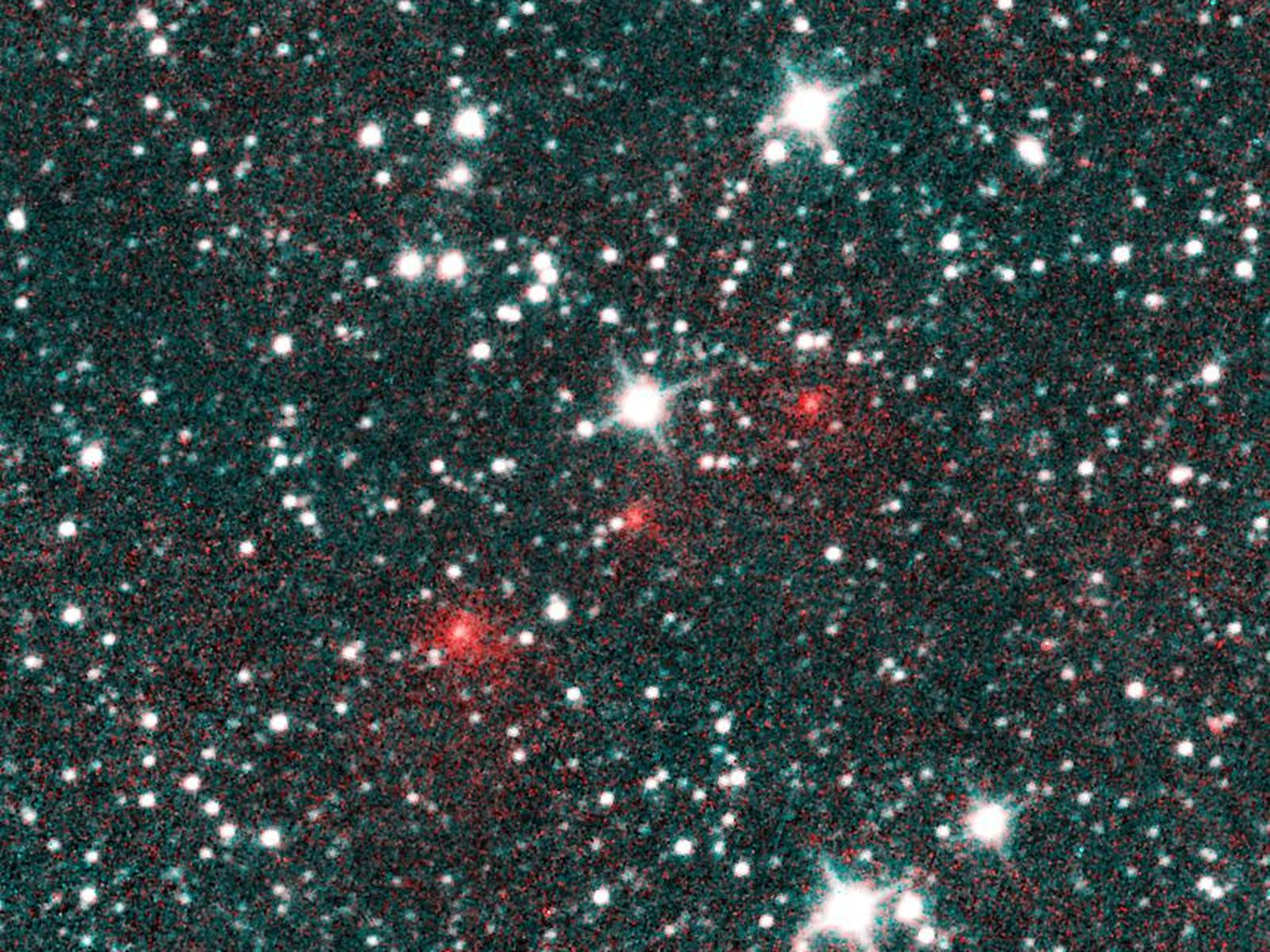
Discovery image of comet C/2020 F3 (NEOWISE)

WISE is credited with discovering 3,088 numbered minor planets. Examples of the mission's numbered minor planet discoveries include:

- (310071) 2010 KR59
- (336756) 2010 NV1
- (419624) 2010 SO16

=== Comet C/2020 F3 (NEOWISE) ===
On 27 March 2020, the comet C/2020 F3 (NEOWISE) was discovered by the WISE spacecraft. It eventually became a naked-eye comet and was widely photographed by professional and amateur astronomers. It was the brightest comet visible in the northern hemisphere since comet Hale–Bopp in 1997.

== Gallery ==
=== Full sky views by WISE ===
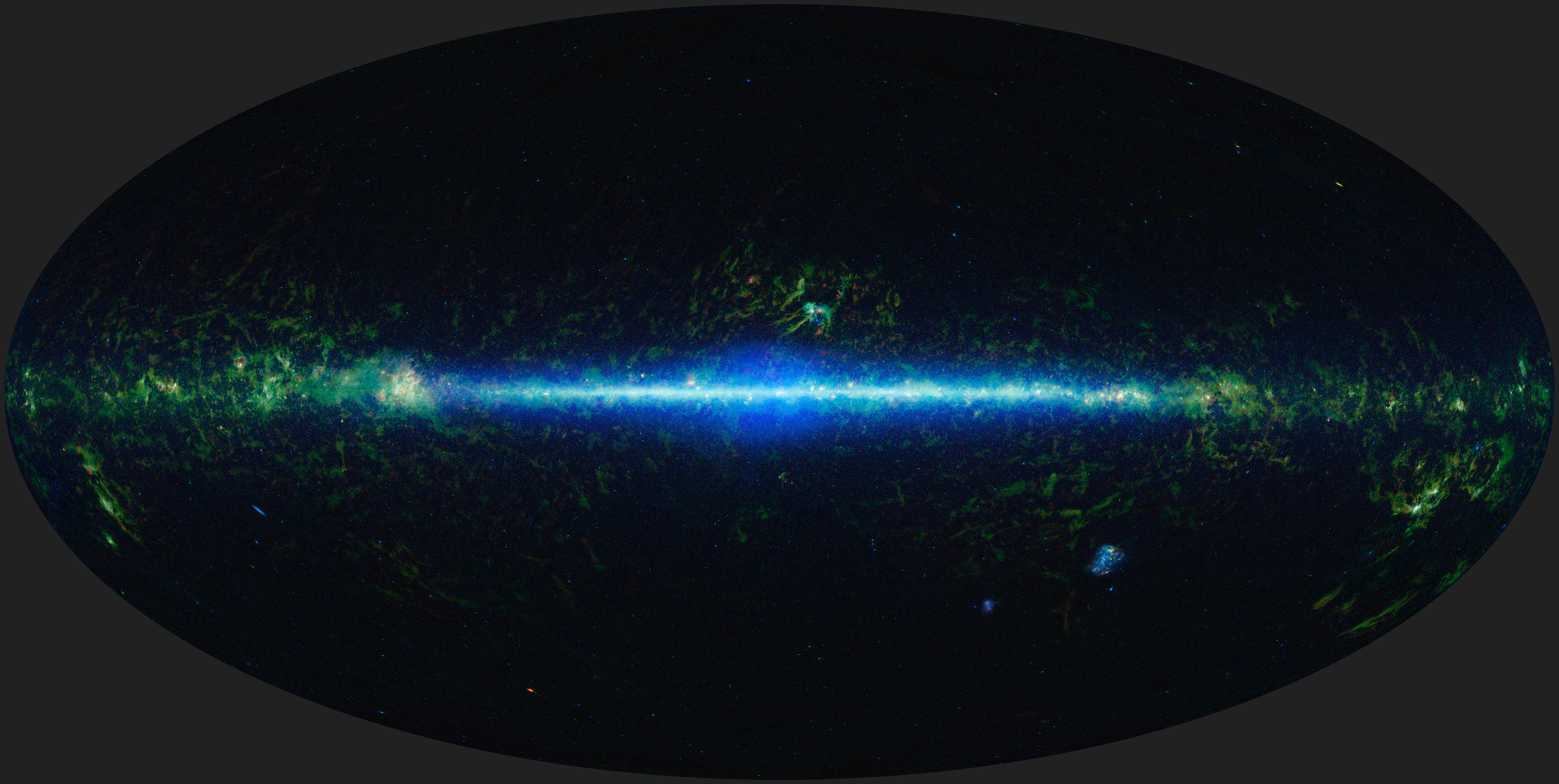
A full-sky view with infrared wavelengths rendered in visible light

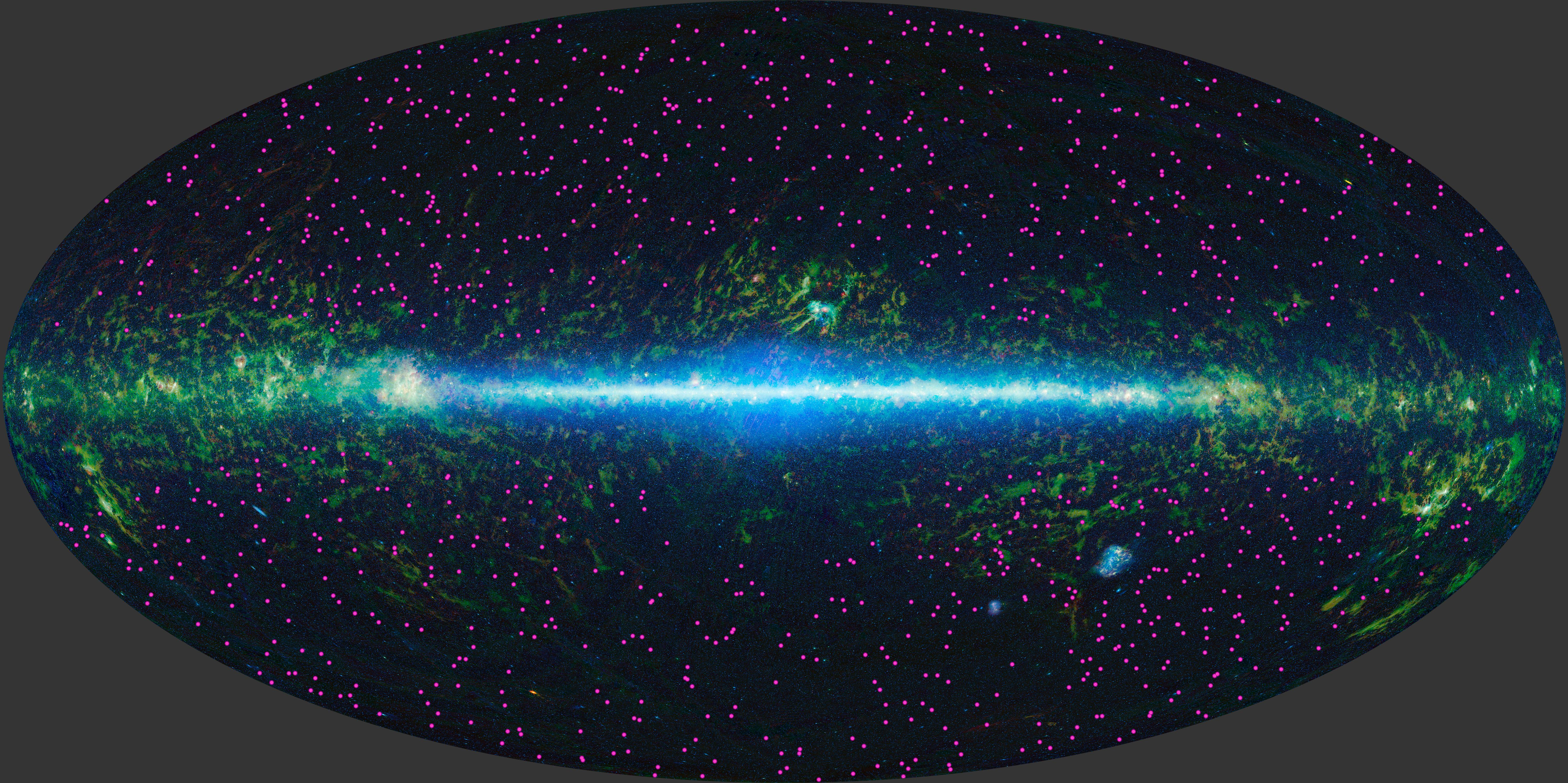
Same full-sky view, highlighting hot, dust-obscured galaxies

=== Selected images by WISE ===
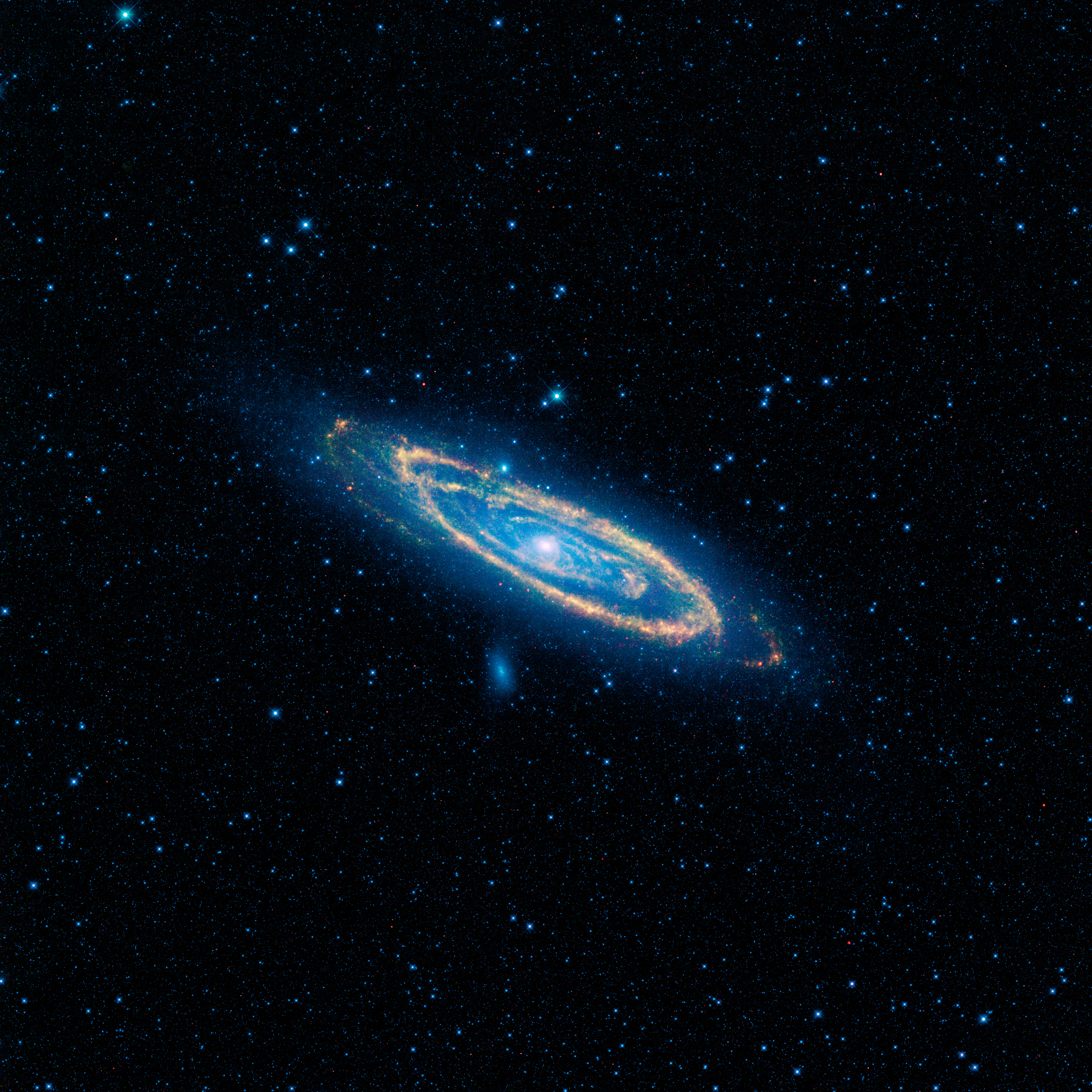
Wide-field infrared view of the Andromeda Galaxy using all four infrared detectors

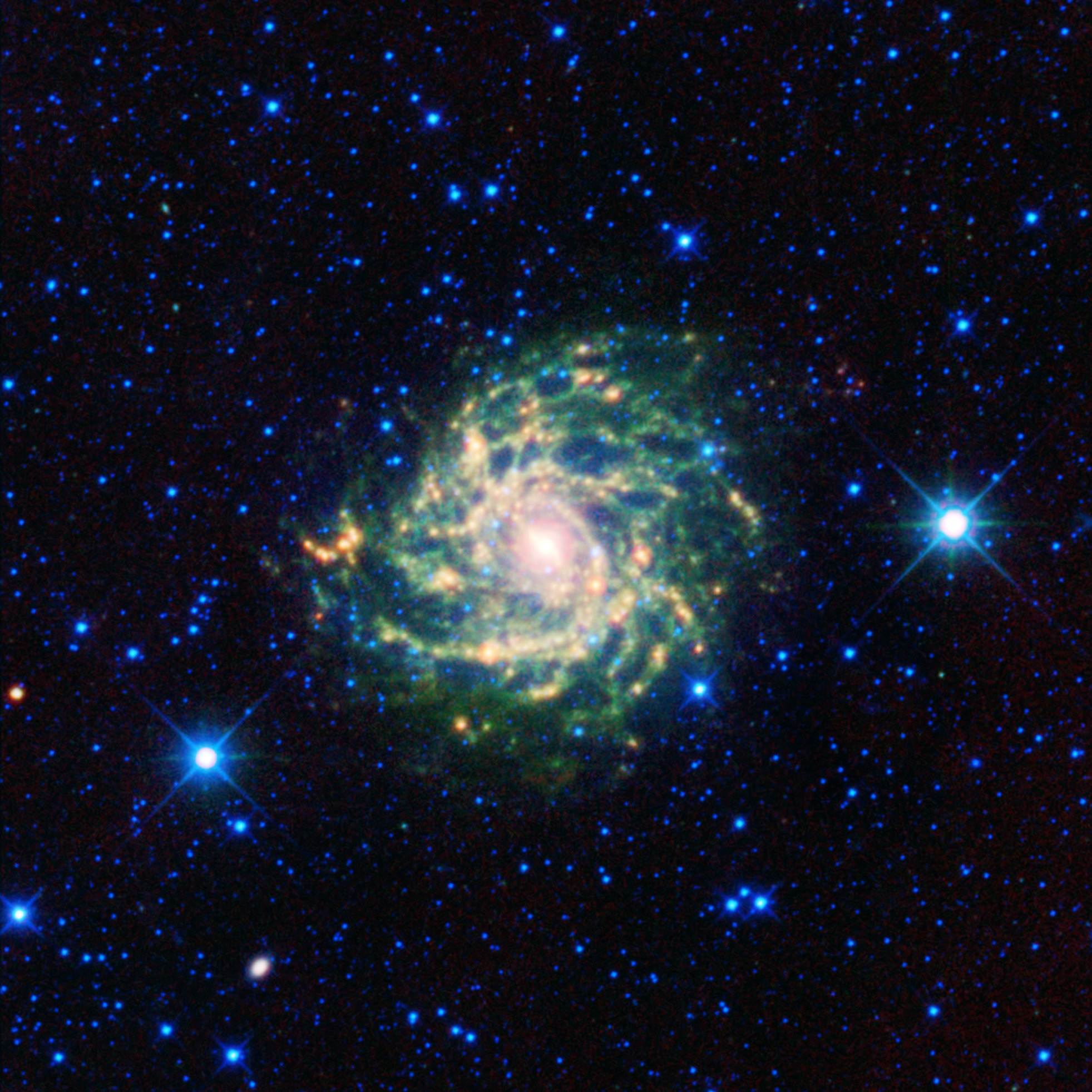
IC 342, a normally obscured galaxy visible through infrared imaging

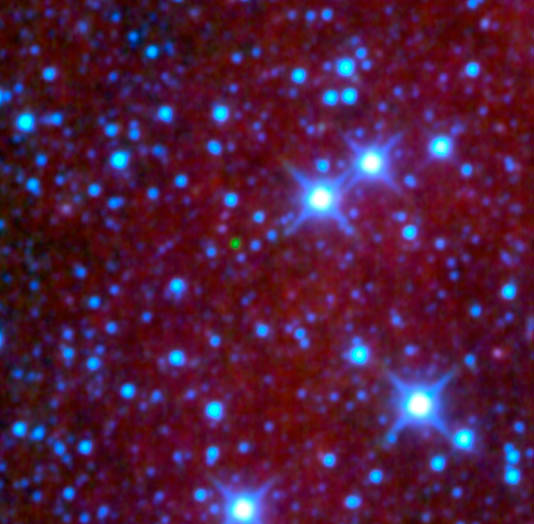
The green dot is WISE 0458+6434, which is thought to consist of two T-class brown dwarfs.

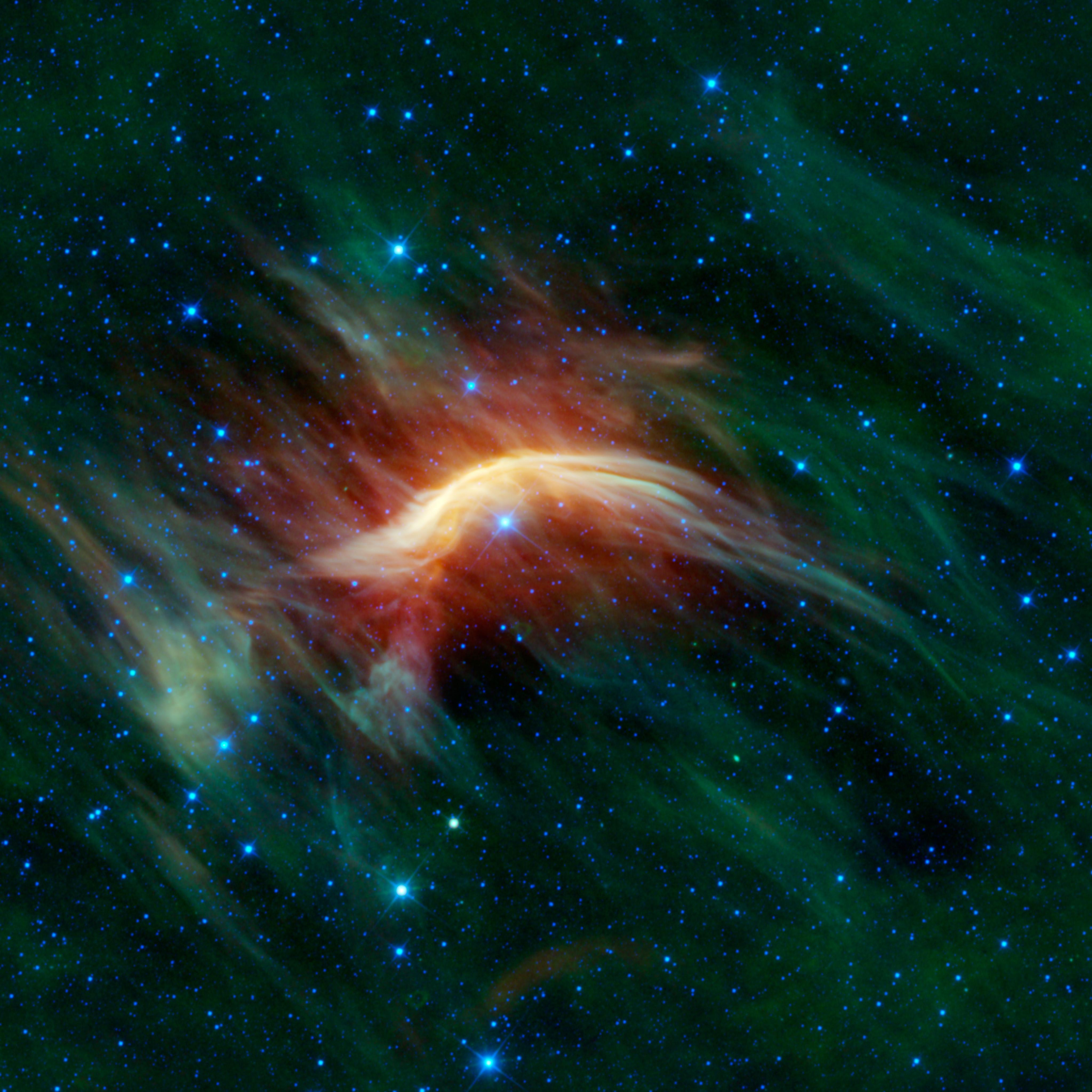
The runaway star Zeta Ophiuchi and the bow shock formed by this massive star

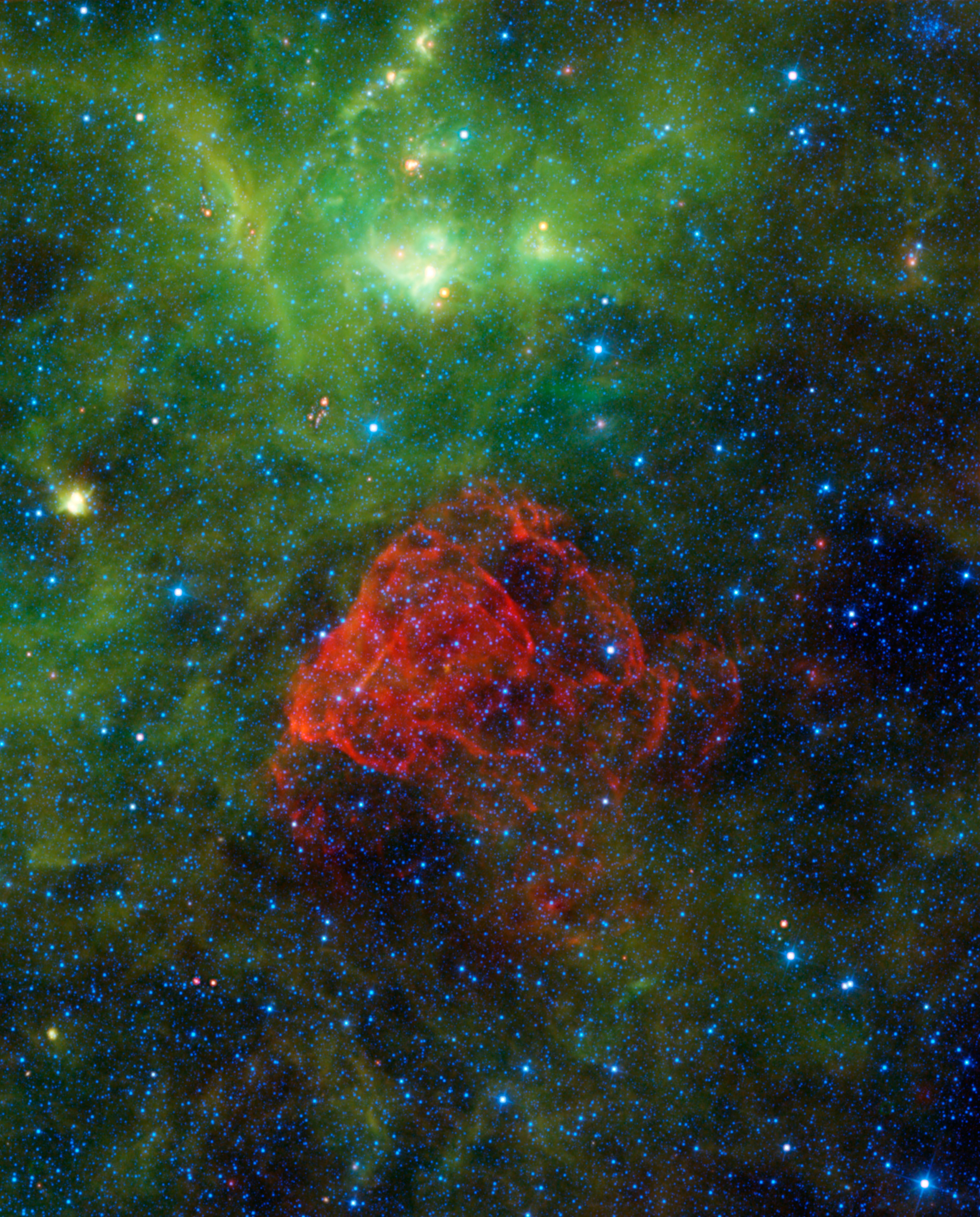
Puppis A, which is a supernova remnant

The Rho Ophiuchi cloud complex

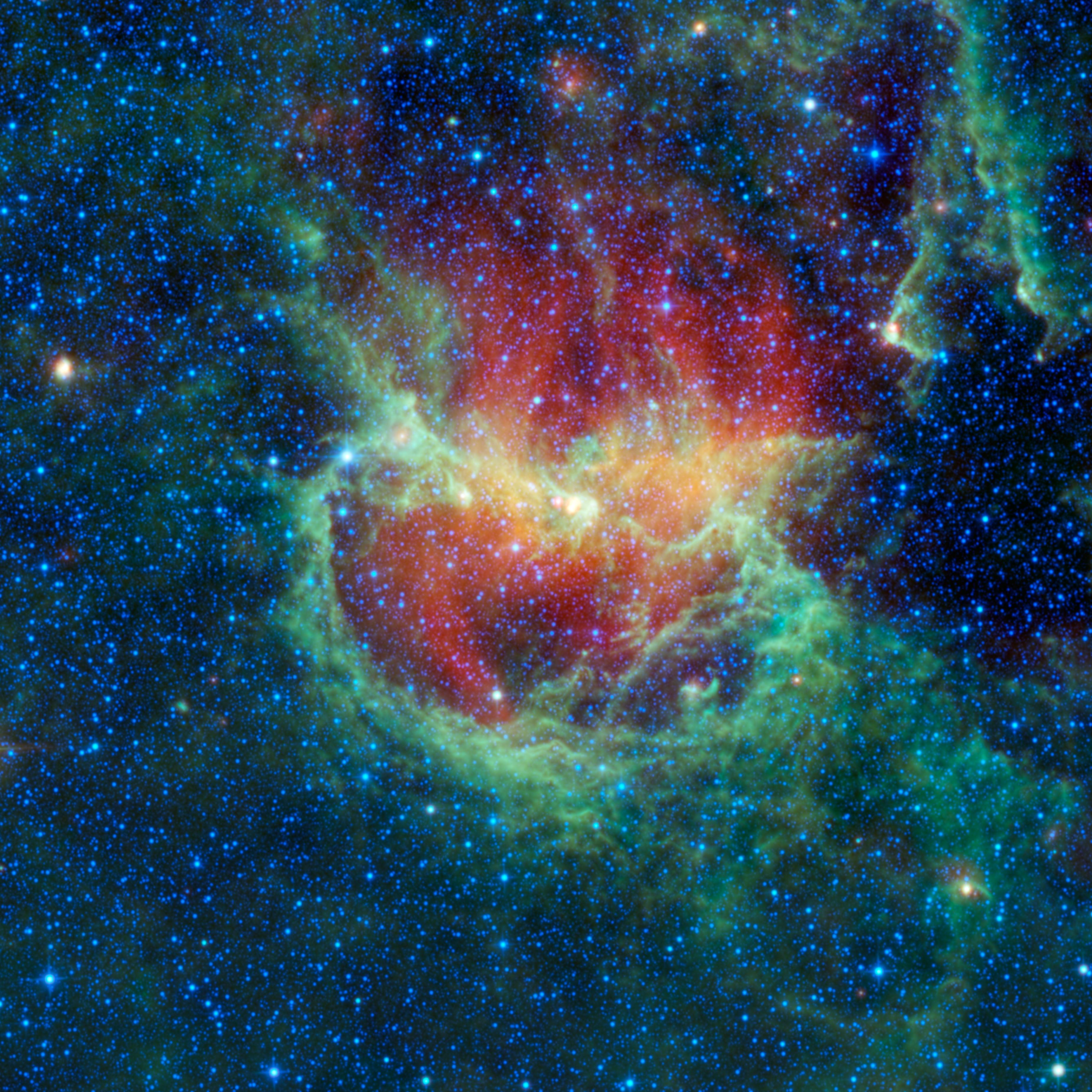
Lambda Centauri nebula, a star-forming region in the Milky Way

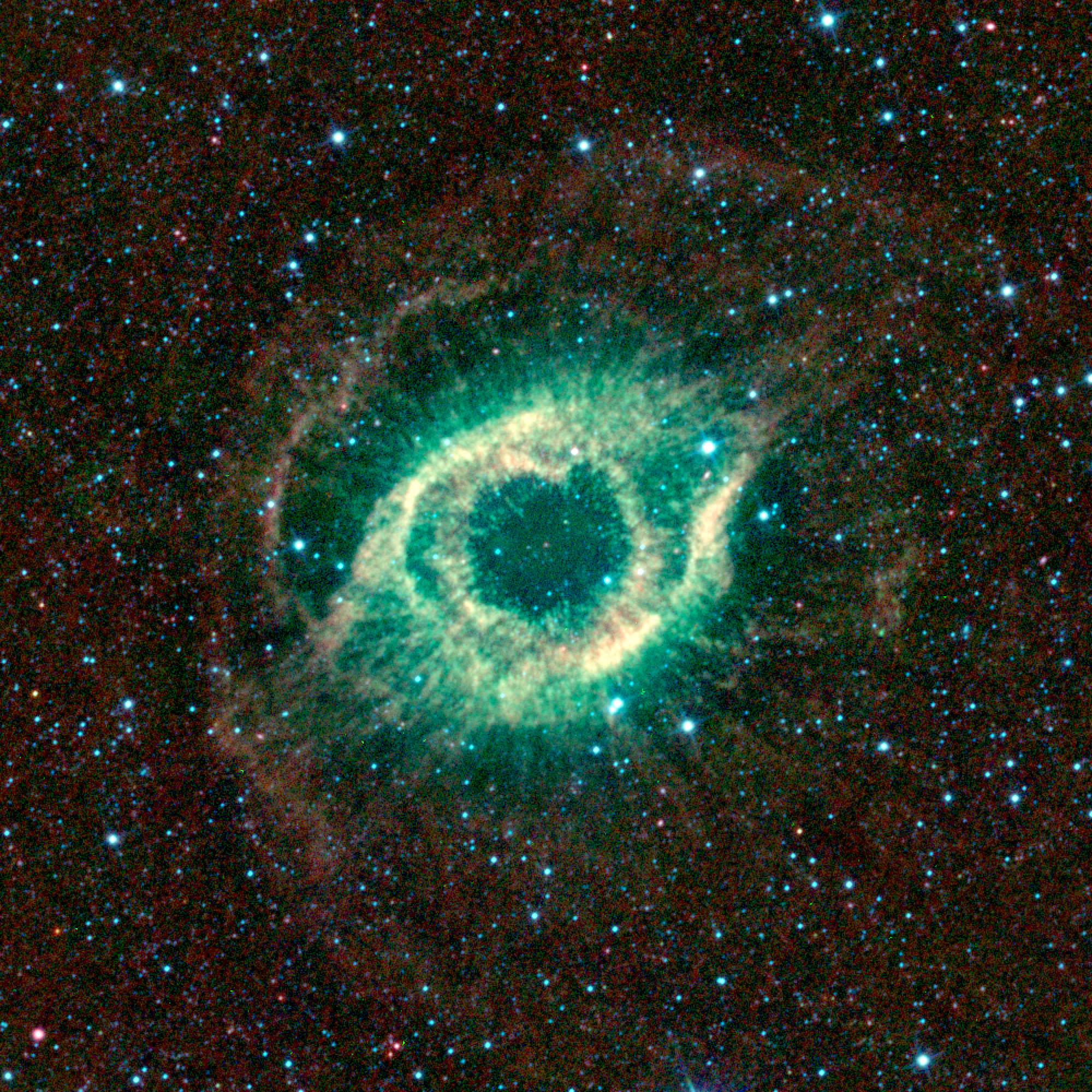
The Helix Nebula, a planetary nebula

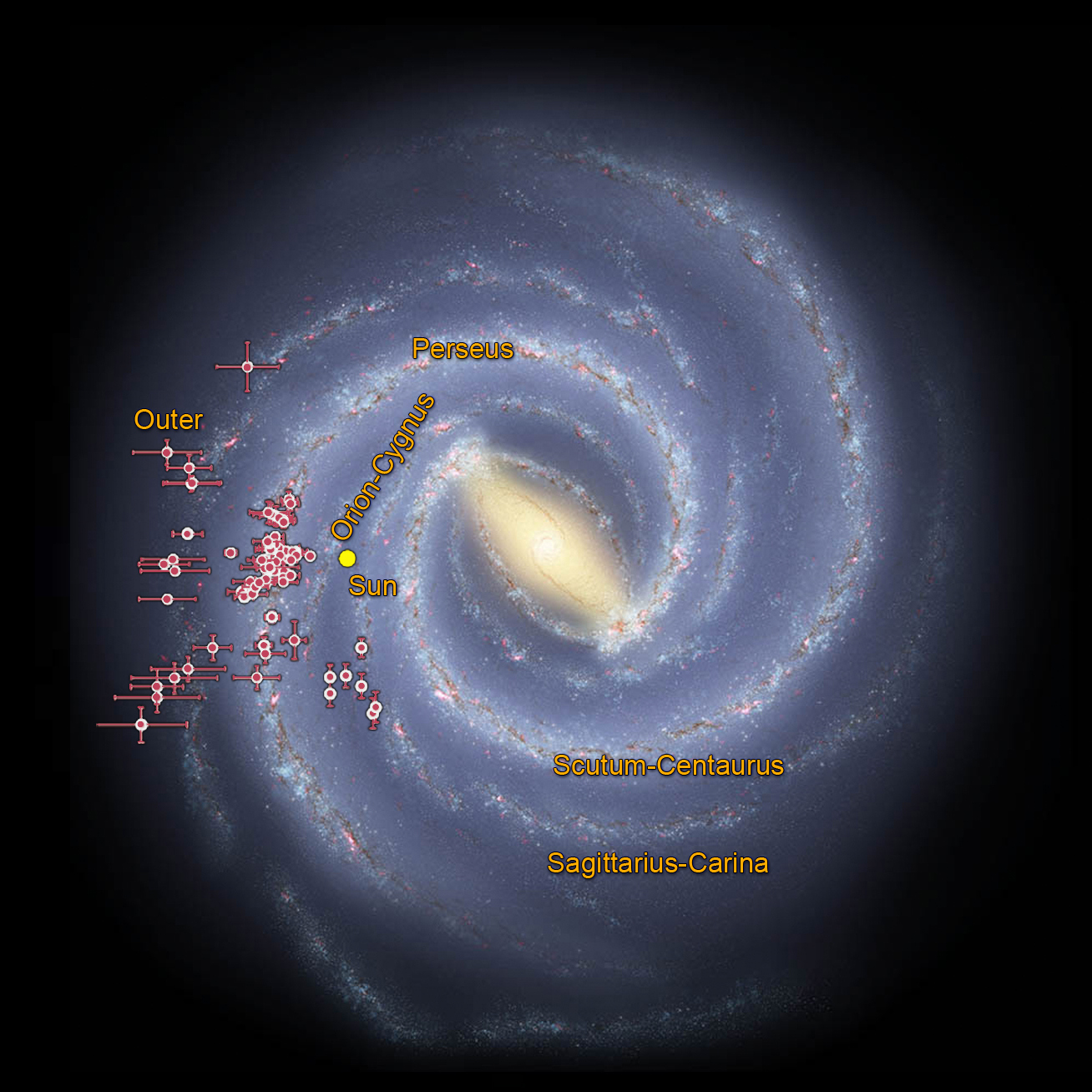
WISE data used to trace the Milky Way's spiral arms

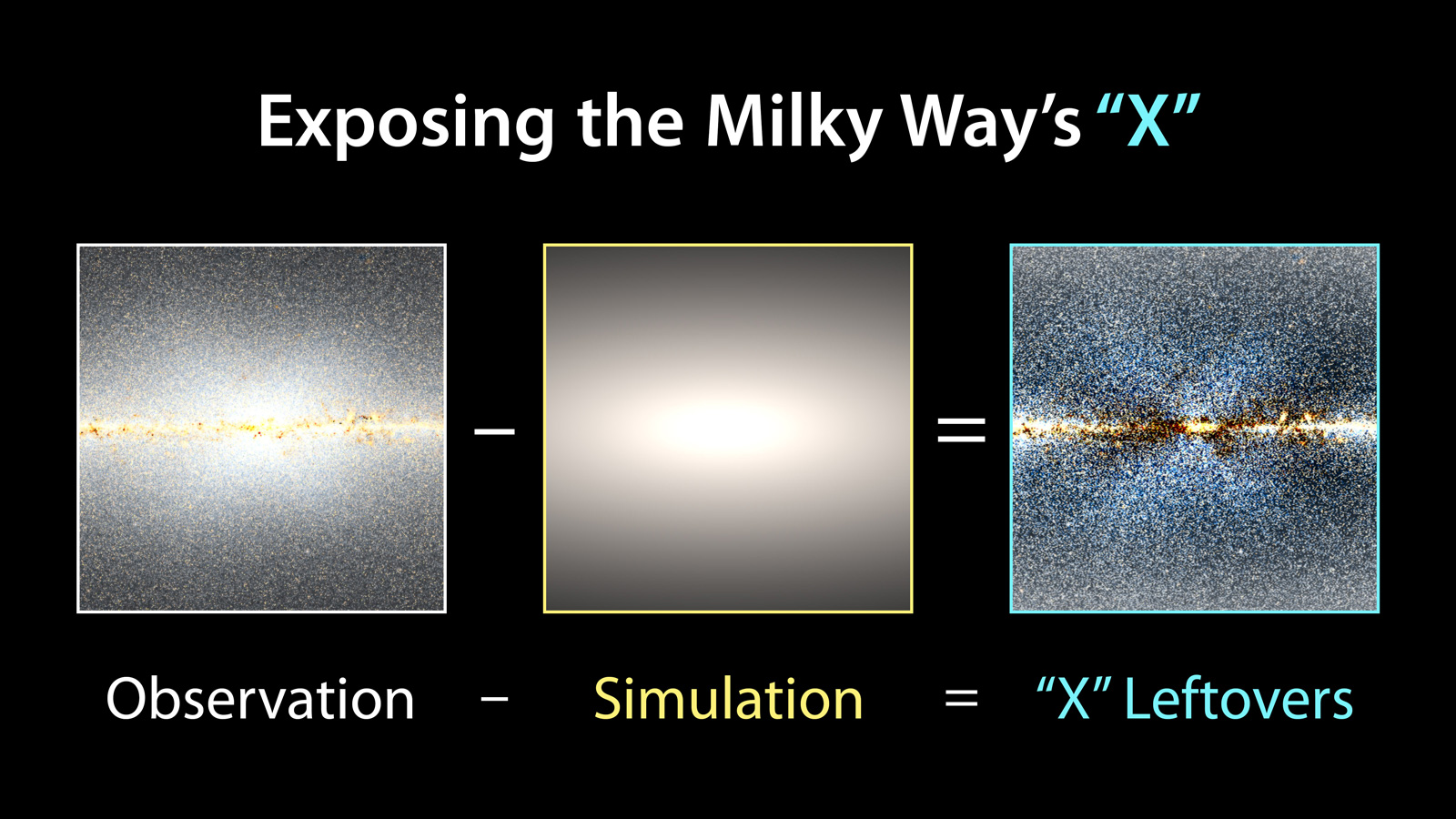
X-shape of the Milky Way bulge revealed by WISE

=== Map with nearby WISE stars ===
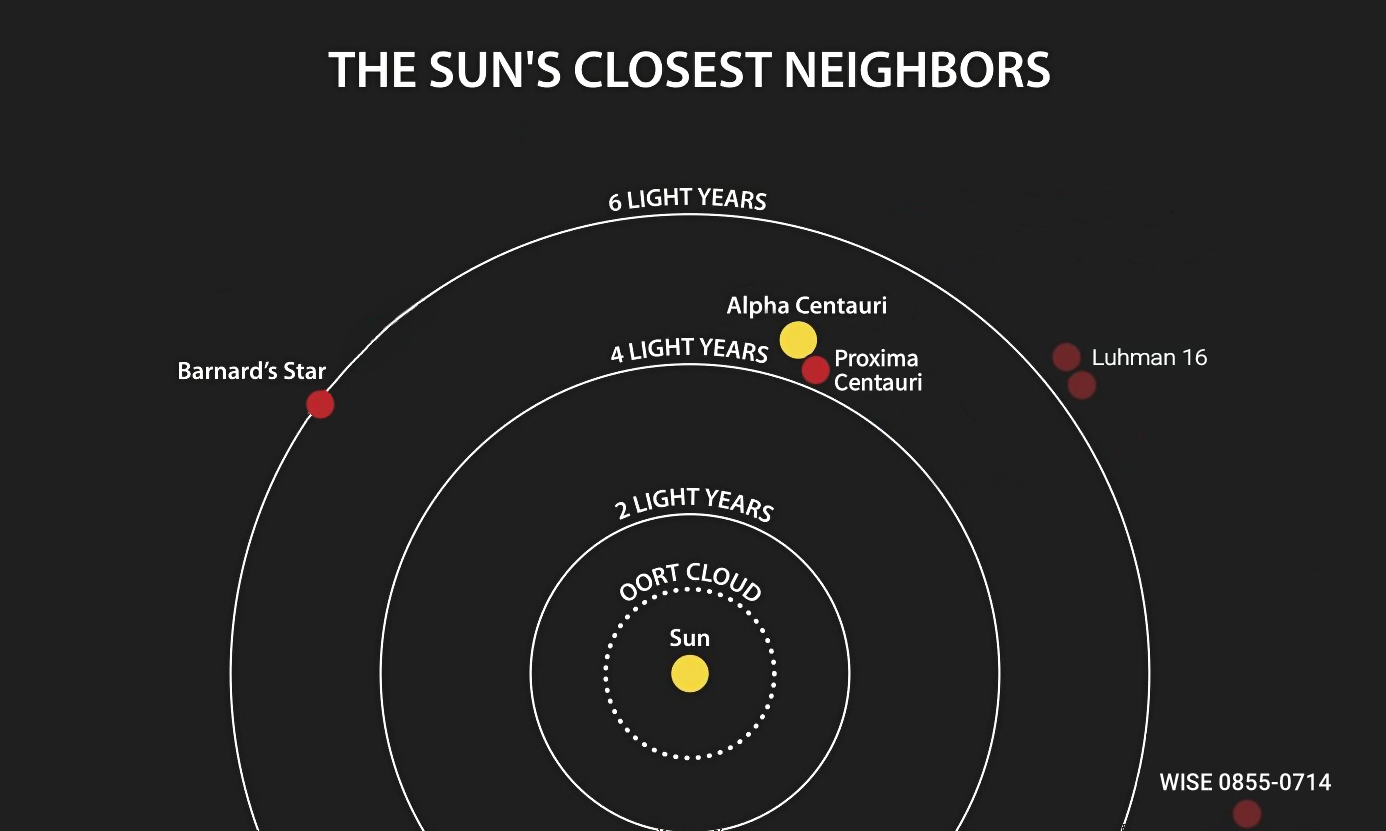
Nearby stars with WISE discoveries WISE 0855−0714 and Luhman 16 (WISE 1049−5319)

== See also ==
- Explorer program – Ongoing NASA space exploration program
- Infrared astronomy
- List of largest infrared telescopes
- Nemesis (hypothetical star)
- Tyche (hypothetical planet)
- NEO Surveyor, a successor to NEOWISE
