= List of unnumbered minor planets: 1999 A–R =

This is a partial list of unnumbered minor planets for principal provisional designations assigned between 1 January and 15 September 1999. As of May 2026, a total of 211 bodies remain unnumbered for this period. Objects for this year are listed on the following pages: A–R · S–T and U–Y. Also see previous and next year.

Near-Earth obj.	MBA (inner)	MBA (outer)	Centaur
Mars-crosser	MBA (middle)	Jupiter trojan	Trans-Neptunian obj.
Unclassified

== A ==
U	Designation	Class	Physical		Observations				Description and notes	Ref
U	Designation	Class	H	D	Opp.	Arc	Last	Used	Description and notes	Ref
0	1999 AF4	AMO	18.5	710 m	multiple	1998–2023	18 May 2023	501	Disc.: LINEAR	MPC · JPL
6	1999 AM10	APO	21.0	220 m	single	11 days	24 Jan 1999	27	Disc.: LINEAR	MPC · JPL
0	1999 AO10	ATE	24.36	59 m	multiple	1999-2026	09 Jun 2026	207	Disc.: LINEAR	MPC · JPL
0	1999 AN16	HUN	19.44	410 m	multiple	1999–2024	30 Sep 2024	45	Disc.: Spacewatch; Alt.: 2015 BN466	MPC · JPL

back to top

== B ==
U	Designation	Class	Physical		Observations				Description and notes	Ref
U	Designation	Class	H	D	Opp.	Arc	Last	Used	Description and notes	Ref
6	1999 BO	AMO	19.1	540 m	single	24 days	09 Feb 1999	58	Disc.: LINEAR	MPC · JPL
7	1999 BL33	AMO	21.9	150 m	single	21 days	07 Feb 1999	17	Disc.: Spacewatch	MPC · JPL

back to top

== C ==
U	Designation	Class	Physical		Observations				Description and notes	Ref
U	Designation	Class	H	D	Opp.	Arc	Last	Used	Description and notes	Ref
8	1999 CQ2	APO	27.3	12 m	single	6 days	13 Feb 1999	16	Disc.: Spacewatch	MPC · JPL
5	1999 CS3	MCA	18.7	540 m	single	38 days	20 Mar 1999	48	Disc.: LINEAR	MPC · JPL
5	1999 CG9	APO	25.2	32 m	single	24 days	06 Mar 1999	42	Disc.: LINEAR	MPC · JPL
E	1999 CW118	TNO	7.8	95 km	single	86 days	07 May 1999	7	Disc.: Mauna Kea Obs. LoUTNOs, cubewano?	MPC · JPL
5	1999 CX118	TNO	7.02	130 km	multiple	1999-2026	21 Apr 2026	21	Disc.: Mauna Kea Obs. LoUTNOs, cubewano?	MPC · JPL
3	1999 CY118	TNO	8.67	70 km	multiple	1999–2017	03 Mar 2017	37	Disc.: Mauna Kea Obs. LoUTNOs, SDO	MPC · JPL
1	1999 CZ118	TNO	7.9	99 km	multiple	1999–2016	13 Mar 2016	29	Disc.: Mauna Kea Obs. LoUTNOs, SDO	MPC · JPL
E	1999 CA119	TNO	7.7	99 km	single	86 days	07 May 1999	6	Disc.: Mauna Kea Obs. LoUTNOs, cubewano?	MPC · JPL
3	1999 CB119	TNO	7.13	204 km	multiple	1999–2022	08 Apr 2022	37	Disc.: Mauna Kea Obs. LoUTNOs, cubewano (hot), BR-mag: 1.93; taxonomy: RR	MPC · JPL
2	1999 CC119	TNO	7.2	121 km	multiple	1999–2019	05 Apr 2019	31	Disc.: Mauna Kea Obs. LoUTNOs, cubewano (cold)	MPC · JPL
E	1999 CD119	TNO	7.3	119 km	single	62 days	13 Apr 1999	6	Disc.: Mauna Kea Obs. LoUTNOs, cubewano?	MPC · JPL
2	1999 CH119	TNO	7.1	158 km	multiple	1999–2018	15 Mar 2018	24	Disc.: Mauna Kea Obs. LoUTNOs, other TNO	MPC · JPL
2	1999 CJ119	TNO	7.4	110 km	multiple	1999–2018	18 Mar 2018	33	Disc.: Mauna Kea Obs. LoUTNOs, cubewano (cold), BR-mag: 2.07	MPC · JPL
E	1999 CK119	TNO	7.9	90 km	single	8 days	19 Feb 1999	4	Disc.: Mauna Kea Obs. LoUTNOs, cubewano?	MPC · JPL
3	1999 CM119	TNO	7.9	87 km	multiple	1999–2005	03 Nov 2005	14	Disc.: Mauna Kea Obs. LoUTNOs, cubewano (cold), BR-mag: 1.78	MPC · JPL
3	1999 CN119	TNO	8.1	80 km	multiple	1999–2018	09 Dec 2018	21	Disc.: Mauna Kea Obs. LoUTNOs, cubewano (cold)	MPC · JPL
0	1999 CZ129	MBA-M	18.18	750 m	multiple	1999–2022	26 Dec 2022	171	Disc.: Mauna Kea Obs.	MPC · JPL
–	1999 CB130	MBA-O	—	—	single	2 days	08 Feb 1999	6	Disc.: Mauna Kea Obs.	MPC · JPL
1	1999 CD130	MBA-I	19.0	470 m	multiple	1999-2020	23 May 2020	44	Disc.: Mauna Kea Obs. Alt.: 2020 HM81	MPC · JPL
E	1999 CE130	MBA-O	—	—	single	3 days	09 Feb 1999	8	Disc.: Mauna Kea Obs.	MPC · JPL
0	1999 CL130	MBA-I	18.4	620 m	multiple	1999–2020	20 Oct 2020	32	Disc.: Mauna Kea Obs.	MPC · JPL
0	1999 CS130	MBA-O	17.68	1.6 km	multiple	1999–2021	06 Oct 2021	54	Disc.: Mauna Kea Obs. Added on 22 July 2020	MPC · JPL
1	1999 CD131	MBA-I	18.9	490 m	multiple	1999–2020	14 Aug 2020	55	Disc.: Mauna Kea Obs.	MPC · JPL
E	1999 CW131	TNO	7.9	90 km	multiple	1999–2000	07 Apr 2000	8	Disc.: Mauna Kea Obs. LoUTNOs, cubewano?	MPC · JPL
E	1999 CY131	TNO	8.1	100 km	single	8 days	19 Feb 1999	4	Disc.: Mauna Kea Obs. LoUTNOs, other TNO	MPC · JPL
4	1999 CZ131	TNO	7.9	82 km	multiple	1999-2019	08 Mar 2019	20	Disc.: Mauna Kea Obs. LoUTNOs, cubewano?	MPC · JPL
E	1999 CA132	TNO	7.4	114 km	single	56 days	08 Apr 1999	6	Disc.: Mauna Kea Obs. LoUTNOs, cubewano?	MPC · JPL
4	1999 CQ133	TNO	6.91	213 km	multiple	1999–2021	20 Mar 2021	32	Disc.: Mauna Kea Obs. LoUTNOs, cubewano (hot), BR-mag: 1.35	MPC · JPL
E	1999 CR133	TNO	8.1	82 km	single	6 days	18 Feb 1999	4	Disc.: Mauna Kea Obs. LoUTNOs, cubewano?	MPC · JPL
3	1999 CM153	TNO	7.4	110 km	multiple	1999–2015	23 Mar 2015	25	Disc.: Mauna Kea Obs. LoUTNOs, cubewano (cold)	MPC · JPL
9	1999 CN153	TNO	7.70	148 km	multiple	1999–2006	02 Mar 2006	19	Disc.: Mauna Kea Obs. LoUTNOs, cubewano (hot)	MPC · JPL
E	1999 CP153	TNO	7.7	99 km	multiple	1999–2000	07 Apr 2000	11	Disc.: Mauna Kea Obs. LoUTNOs, cubewano?	MPC · JPL
5	1999 CQ153	TNO	8.0	83 km	multiple	1999–2015	20 Mar 2015	14	Disc.: Mauna Kea Obs. LoUTNOs, cubewano (cold)	MPC · JPL
6	1999 CR153	TNO	7.68	79 km	multiple	1999-2026	25 Mar 2026	15	Disc.: Mauna Kea Obs. LoUTNOs, cubewano?	MPC · JPL
E	1999 CS153	TNO	8.1	82 km	multiple	1999–2000	07 Apr 2000	10	Disc.: Mauna Kea Obs. LoUTNOs, cubewano?	MPC · JPL
5	1999 CT153	TNO	8.31	75 km	multiple	1999-2017	23 Jan 2017	27	Disc.: Mauna Kea Obs. LoUTNOs, cubewano?	MPC · JPL
5	1999 CG154	TNO	7.4	110 km	multiple	1999–2005	10 Mar 2005	15	Disc.: Mauna Kea Obs. LoUTNOs, cubewano (cold)	MPC · JPL
5	1999 CH154	TNO	7.66	98 km	multiple	1999–2015	16 Mar 2015	13	Disc.: Mauna Kea Obs. LoUTNOs, cubewano (cold)	MPC · JPL
2	1999 CL154	MBA-I	18.66	550 m	multiple	1999-2024	06 Jul 2024	20	Disc.: Mauna Kea Obs. Alt.: 2024 KO8	MPC · JPL
6	1999 CM154	MBA-O	16.7	2.5 km	multiple	1999–2020	11 Nov 2020	9	Disc.: Mauna Kea Obs.	MPC · JPL
4	1999 CN154	MBA-O	18.75	900 m	multiple	1999-2014	04 Mar 2014	17	Disc.: Mauna Kea Obs. Alt.: 2014 EM304	MPC · JPL
E	1999 CM155	MBA-O	—	—	single	2 days	08 Feb 1999	6	Disc.: Mauna Kea Obs.	MPC · JPL
1	1999 CR155	MCA	17.6	900 m	multiple	1999-2021	10 Apr 2021	66	Disc.: LONEOS Alt.: 2010 CV75	MPC · JPL
3	1999 CK158	TNO	8.3	91 km	multiple	1999–2018	18 Feb 2018	19	Disc.: Mauna Kea Obs. LoUTNOs, other TNO	MPC · JPL

back to top

== D ==
U	Designation	Class	Physical		Observations				Description and notes	Ref
U	Designation	Class	H	D	Opp.	Arc	Last	Used	Description and notes	Ref
3	1999 DA	TNO	7.9	87 km	multiple	1999–2015	24 Apr 2015	46	Disc.: Mauna Kea Obs. LoUTNOs, cubewano (cold)	MPC · JPL
0	1999 DB2	AMO	19.0	560 m	multiple	1999–2020	13 Jun 2020	189	Disc.: LINEAR	MPC · JPL
5	1999 DY2	AMO	21.9	150 m	single	56 days	15 Apr 1999	74	Disc.: LINEAR	MPC · JPL
0	1999 DJ3	AMO	20.78	230 m	multiple	1999–2025	24 Feb 2025	50	Disc.: Spacewatch	MPC · JPL
E	1999 DZ7	TNO	8.8	82 km	single	1 day	17 Feb 1999	4	Disc.: Mauna Kea Obs. LoUTNOs, plutino?	MPC · JPL
E	1999 DA8	TNO	12.4	16 km	single	1 day	17 Feb 1999	6	Disc.: Mauna Kea Obs. LoUTNOs, plutino?	MPC · JPL
E	1999 DB8	TNO	10.0	42 km	single	35 days	23 Mar 1999	7	Disc.: Mauna Kea Obs. LoUTNOs, other TNO	MPC · JPL
E	1999 DC8	TNO	10.0	34 km	single	1 day	17 Feb 1999	4	Disc.: Mauna Kea Obs. LoUTNOs, cubewano?	MPC · JPL
E	1999 DD8	TNO	11.1	28 km	single	1 day	17 Feb 1999	5	Disc.: Mauna Kea Obs. LoUTNOs, plutino?	MPC · JPL
E	1999 DE8	TNO	9.6	41 km	single	1 day	17 Feb 1999	4	Disc.: Mauna Kea Obs. LoUTNOs, cubewano?	MPC · JPL
E	1999 DF8	TNO	9.9	36 km	single	1 day	17 Feb 1999	4	Disc.: Mauna Kea Obs. LoUTNOs, cubewano?	MPC · JPL
E	1999 DG8	TNO	8.1	91 km	single	1 day	17 Feb 1999	4	Disc.: Mauna Kea Obs. LoUTNOs, SDO	MPC · JPL
5	1999 DH8	TNO	8.7	60 km	multiple	1999–2001	24 Feb 2001	11	Disc.: Mauna Kea Obs. LoUTNOs, cubewano (cold)	MPC · JPL
E	1999 DL8	TNO	9.6	62 km	single	35 days	23 Mar 1999	6	Disc.: Mauna Kea Obs. LoUTNOs, cubewano (hot)	MPC · JPL
E	1999 DM8	TNO	9.7	39 km	single	1 day	17 Feb 1999	4	Disc.: Mauna Kea Obs. LoUTNOs, cubewano?	MPC · JPL
E	1999 DN8	TNO	9.8	38 km	single	1 day	17 Feb 1999	4	Disc.: Mauna Kea Obs. LoUTNOs, cubewano?	MPC · JPL
E	1999 DO8	TNO	10.0	34 km	single	1 day	17 Feb 1999	4	Disc.: Mauna Kea Obs. LoUTNOs, cubewano?	MPC · JPL
E	1999 DP8	TNO	8.9	63 km	single	1 day	17 Feb 1999	4	Disc.: Mauna Kea Obs. LoUTNOs, SDO	MPC · JPL
E	1999 DQ8	TNO	9.1	52 km	single	1 day	17 Feb 1999	4	Disc.: Mauna Kea Obs. LoUTNOs, cubewano?	MPC · JPL
E	1999 DR8	TNO	9.3	47 km	single	1 day	17 Feb 1999	4	Disc.: Mauna Kea Obs. LoUTNOs, cubewano?	MPC · JPL

back to top

== E ==
U	Designation	Class	Physical		Observations				Description and notes	Ref
U	Designation	Class	H	D	Opp.	Arc	Last	Used	Description and notes	Ref
0	1999 EO3	AMO	19.09	540 m	multiple	1999–2021	17 Apr 2021	308	Disc.: Spacewatch	MPC · JPL
0	1999 EF5	AMO	19.68	450 m	multiple	1999–2019	27 Mar 2019	103	Disc.: LINEAR	MPC · JPL
0	1999 ES6	MBA-I	18.79	500 m	multiple	1999–2023	09 Oct 2023	51	Disc.: Spacewatch; Alt.: 2021 BS4	MPC · JPL

back to top

== F ==
U	Designation	Class	Physical		Observations				Description and notes	Ref
U	Designation	Class	H	D	Opp.	Arc	Last	Used	Description and notes	Ref
7	1999 FR5	APO	23.4	74 m	single	6 days	25 Mar 1999	77	Disc.: LINEAR	MPC · JPL
8	1999 FQ10	APO	23.2	81 m	single	4 days	24 Mar 1999	15	Disc.: LINEAR	MPC · JPL
0	1999 FN19	APO	22.5	110 m	multiple	1999–2018	11 Aug 2018	320	Disc.: LINEAR; AMO at MPC	MPC · JPL
0	1999 FP19	APO	20.23	340 m	multiple	1999–2026	19 Feb 2026	84	Disc.: LINEAR	MPC · JPL
0	1999 FR19	APO	22.49	140 m	multiple	1999-2025	01 Nov 2025	60	Disc.: LINEAR	MPC · JPL
0	1999 FJ64	MBA-O	17.0	2.2 km	multiple	1999–2021	17 Apr 2021	45	Disc.: SDSS; Added on 11 May 2021; Alt.: 2010 KL120	MPC · JPL
0	1999 FN64	MBA-O	17.27	2.0 km	multiple	1999–2021	11 May 2021	71	Disc.: SDSS	MPC · JPL
0	1999 FY64	MBA-M	18.4	880 m	multiple	1999–2021	15 Mar 2021	47	Disc.: SDSS; Added on 11 May 2021; Alt.: 2017 HK45	MPC · JPL
2	1999 FV65	MBA-M	18.78	570 m	multiple	1999–2024	01 Mar 2024	36	Disc.: SDSS	MPC · JPL
1	1999 FT68	MBA-I	19.13	450 m	multiple	1999–2023	26 Mar 2023	29	Disc.: SDSS	MPC · JPL
1	1999 FU68	MBA-M	18.8	730 m	multiple	1999–2020	22 Apr 2020	56	Disc.: SDSS; Added on 22 July 2020	MPC · JPL
0	1999 FV68	MBA-O	17.7	1.6 km	multiple	1999–2020	12 Apr 2020	37	Disc.: SDSS	MPC · JPL
1	1999 FK69	MBA-M	18.0	750 m	multiple	1999–2018	16 Dec 2018	30	Disc.: SDSS	MPC · JPL
0	1999 FM70	MBA-I	18.77	520 m	multiple	1999–2021	14 May 2021	43	Disc.: SDSS; Added on 11 May 2021; Alt.: 2010 GR138, 2021 GK56	MPC · JPL
0	1999 FD72	MBA-I	17.79	820 m	multiple	1999–2021	06 Dec 2021	138	Disc.: SDSS; Added on 17 January 2021	MPC · JPL
1	1999 FK72	MBA-O	17.3	1.9 km	multiple	1999–2020	05 Mar 2020	36	Disc.: SDSS; Added on 22 July 2020	MPC · JPL
0	1999 FA73	MBA-I	18.3	650 m	multiple	1999–2018	21 Apr 2018	38	Disc.: SDSS; Alt.: 2014 DP88	MPC · JPL
0	1999 FH73	MBA-M	17.83	1.5 km	multiple	1999–2022	27 Jan 2022	57	Disc.: SDSS; Added on 17 January 2021; Alt.: 2015 RB166	MPC · JPL
0	1999 FK74	MBA-M	18.11	710 m	multiple	1999–2021	09 Oct 2021	87	Disc.: SDSS; Added on 22 July 2020	MPC · JPL
0	1999 FL77	MBA-I	18.73	530 m	multiple	1999–2021	30 Oct 2021	59	Disc.: SDSS; Added on 5 November 2021	MPC · JPL
0	1999 FK78	MBA-I	18.7	540 m	multiple	1999–2021	15 Apr 2021	40	Disc.: SDSS; Added on 11 May 2021; Alt.: 2021 EG6	MPC · JPL
0	1999 FL79	MBA-M	18.4	620 m	multiple	1999–2020	25 May 2020	30	Disc.: SDSS	MPC · JPL
0	1999 FW79	MBA-I	18.67	550 m	multiple	1999–2021	04 Aug 2021	47	Disc.: SDSS; Added on 22 July 2020	MPC · JPL
1	1999 FN80	MBA-I	18.96	490 m	multiple	1999–2024	01 Apr 2024	22	Disc.: SDSS; Alt.: 2013 CD26	MPC · JPL
0	1999 FQ81	MBA-I	18.51	590 m	multiple	1999–2021	15 Sep 2021	44	Disc.: SDSS; Added on 30 September 2021; Alt.: 2014 QM560	MPC · JPL
0	1999 FX81	MBA-M	17.6	1.3 km	multiple	1999–2016	10 May 2016	35	Disc.: SDSS; Added on 22 July 2020	MPC · JPL
2	1999 FL87	MBA-M	18.1	1.0 km	multiple	1999–2017	01 May 2017	38	Disc.: SDSS	MPC · JPL
1	1999 FN87	MBA-M	18.56	1.1 km	multiple	1999–2025	26 Dec 2025	26	Disc.: SDSS	MPC · JPL
0	1999 FA88	MBA-I	19.03	460 m	multiple	1995–2021	15 Apr 2021	42	Disc.: SDSS; Added on 11 May 2021; Alt.: 2021 EB9	MPC · JPL
0	1999 FV90	MBA-M	17.6	1.7 km	multiple	1999–2021	18 Jan 2021	36	Disc.: SDSS; Alt.: 2009 SG94	MPC · JPL
1	1999 FA91	MBA-I	18.96	480 m	multiple	1999–2024	11 Feb 2024	33	Disc.: SDSS; Added on 21 August 2021; Alt.: 2021 JN35	MPC · JPL
0	1999 FK95	MBA-I	18.63	560 m	multiple	1999–2021	18 May 2021	48	Disc.: SDSS; Added on 11 May 2021	MPC · JPL
0	1999 FT95	MBA-M	17.7	1.6 km	multiple	1999–2019	03 Oct 2019	28	Disc.: SDSS; Added on 22 July 2020	MPC · JPL
2	1999 FL97	MBA-M	18.86	450 m	multiple	1999-2015	26 Jan 2015	20	Disc.: SDSS	MPC · JPL
0	1999 FK100	HUN	19.62	350 m	multiple	1999–2021	15 Apr 2021	40	Disc.: SDSS	MPC · JPL
1	1999 FL100	MBA-I	19.1	450 m	multiple	1999–2020	22 Apr 2020	55	Disc.: SDSS	MPC · JPL
0	1999 FY100	MBA-M	17.5	1.8 km	multiple	1999–2018	05 Oct 2018	38	Disc.: SDSS	MPC · JPL
1	1999 FH101	MBA-M	18.2	960 m	multiple	1999–2017	13 Jun 2017	33	Disc.: SDSS	MPC · JPL
1	1999 FK101	MBA-M	18.56	580 m	multiple	1999–2021	26 Nov 2021	43	Disc.: No observations Added on 19 October 2020	MPC · JPL
0	1999 FM101	MBA-O	17.37	1.9 km	multiple	1999–2021	14 Apr 2021	33	Disc.: SDSS; Added on 21 August 2021	MPC · JPL
0	1999 FO101	MBA-O	17.16	2.1 km	multiple	1999–2022	27 Apr 2022	87	Disc.: LONEOS; Added on 29 January 2022	MPC · JPL

back to top

== G ==
U	Designation	Class	Physical		Observations				Description and notes	Ref
U	Designation	Class	H	D	Opp.	Arc	Last	Used	Description and notes	Ref
5	1999 GL4	APO	19.7	410 m	multiple	1998–1999	22 May 1999	46	Disc.: LINEAR; Potentially hazardous object	MPC · JPL
1	1999 GR6	APO	20.1	360 m	multiple	1999–2026	05 Feb 2026	63	Disc.: LINEAR	MPC · JPL
3	1999 GS46	TNO	6.9	214 km	multiple	1999–2016	29 May 2016	34	Disc.: La Silla Obs. LoUTNOs, cubewano (hot), BR-mag: 1.76	MPC · JPL
1	1999 GE64	MBA-I	18.8	520 m	multiple	1999–2017	18 Aug 2017	27	Disc.: Spacewatch; Added on 19 October 2020	MPC · JPL

back to top

== H ==
U	Designation	Class	Physical		Observations				Description and notes	Ref
U	Designation	Class	H	D	Opp.	Arc	Last	Used	Description and notes	Ref
7	1999 HC1	APO	24.5	45 m	single	5 days	21 Apr 1999	11	Disc.: LINEAR; AMO at MPC	MPC · JPL
0	1999 HW1	AMO	20.05	350 m	multiple	1999–2021	11 May 2021	201	Disc.: LINEAR	MPC · JPL
1	1999 HX1	AMO	19.9	370 m	multiple	1999–2003	31 Jul 2003	108	Disc.: LINEAR	MPC · JPL
0	1999 HH7	MBA-I	18.16	690 m	multiple	1999–2020	28 Apr 2020	52	Disc.: Spacewatch; Added on 11 May 2021; Alt.: 2006 JU88	MPC · JPL
3	1999 HS11	TNO	6.9	139 km	multiple	1999–2014	25 Apr 2014	33	Disc.: Kitt Peak; LoUTNOs, cubewano (cold), BR-mag: 1.76; taxonomy: RR	MPC · JPL
E	1999 HY11	TNO	8.3	75 km	single	20 days	07 May 1999	6	Disc.: Kitt Peak; LoUTNOs, cubewano?	MPC · JPL
E	1999 HZ11	TNO	8.4	72 km	single	20 days	07 May 1999	5	Disc.: Kitt Peak; LoUTNOs, cubewano?	MPC · JPL
E	1999 HA12	TNO	7.8	95 km	single	50 days	06 Jun 1999	8	Disc.: Kitt Peak; LoUTNOs, cubewano?	MPC · JPL
8	1999 HD12	CEN	12.8	15 km	single	50 days	05 Jun 1999	11	Disc.: Kitt Peak	MPC · JPL
3	1999 HG12	TNO	7.2	131 km	multiple	1999–2013	14 Mar 2013	23	Disc.: Kitt Peak; LoUTNOs, res · 4:7, BR-mag: 1.61; taxonomy: IR-RR	MPC · JPL
3	1999 HH12	TNO	7.0	132 km	multiple	1999–2015	22 May 2015	25	Disc.: Kitt Peak; LoUTNOs, cubewano (cold)	MPC · JPL
3	1999 HJ12	TNO	7.4	110 km	multiple	1999–2015	15 Apr 2015	29	Disc.: Kitt Peak; LoUTNOs, cubewano (cold)	MPC · JPL

back to top

== J ==
U	Designation	Class	Physical		Observations				Description and notes	Ref
U	Designation	Class	H	D	Opp.	Arc	Last	Used	Description and notes	Ref
7	1999 JZ10	APO	21.8	160 m	single	20 days	03 Jun 1999	51	Disc.: LINEAR; Potentially hazardous object	MPC · JPL
E	1999 JV127	CEN	10.4	46 km	single	8 days	18 May 1999	44	Disc.: Cerro Tololo	MPC · JPL
–	1999 JA132	TNO	7.7	99 km	single	59 days	19 May 1999	41	Disc.: Cerro Tololo; LoUTNOs, cubewano?	MPC · JPL
E	1999 JB132	TNO	8.2	108 km	single	8 days	18 May 1999	25	Disc.: Cerro Tololo; LoUTNOs, plutino?	MPC · JPL
E	1999 JC132	TNO	8.7	86 km	single	1 day	11 May 1999	24	Disc.: Cerro Tololo; LoUTNOs, plutino?	MPC · JPL
3	1999 JD132	TNO	7.7	148 km	multiple	1999–2018	10 Apr 2018	67	Disc.: Cerro Tololo; LoUTNOs, cubewano (hot), BR-mag: 1.59	MPC · JPL
E	1999 JE132	TNO	8.6	90 km	single	9 days	19 May 1999	55	Disc.: Cerro Tololo; LoUTNOs, plutino?	MPC · JPL
E	1999 JF132	TNO	7.9	90 km	single	9 days	19 May 1999	37	Disc.: Cerro Tololo; LoUTNOs, cubewano?	MPC · JPL
E	1999 JH132	TNO	9.6	41 km	single	9 days	19 May 1999	4	Disc.: Cerro Tololo; LoUTNOs, cubewano?	MPC · JPL
E	1999 JJ132	TNO	8.8	60 km	single	9 days	19 May 1999	4	Disc.: Cerro Tololo; LoUTNOs, cubewano?	MPC · JPL
E	1999 JK132	TNO	9.2	68 km	single	9 days	19 May 1999	4	Disc.: Cerro Tololo; LoUTNOs, plutino?	MPC · JPL

back to top

== K ==
U	Designation	Class	Physical		Observations				Description and notes	Ref
U	Designation	Class	H	D	Opp.	Arc	Last	Used	Description and notes	Ref
7	1999 KL1	APO	21.5	180 m	single	16 days	02 Jun 1999	26	Disc.: LINEAR	MPC · JPL
1	1999 KJ6	MCA	18.4	1.2 km	multiple	1999–2020	24 Jun 2020	68	Disc.: LINEAR; Added on 13 September 2020; Alt.: 2010 NO142	MPC · JPL
E	1999 KT16	TNO	8.8	60 km	single	1 day	19 May 1999	4	Disc.: Cerro Tololo; LoUTNOs, cubewano?	MPC · JPL
9	1999 KK17	TNO	7.78	60 km	multiple	1999-2025	14 Jul 2025	7	Disc.: Cerro Tololo; LoUTNOs, cubewano?	MPC · JPL
E	1999 KL17	TNO	8.7	62 km	single	90 days	08 Aug 1999	13	Disc.: Cerro Tololo; LoUTNOs, cubewano?	MPC · JPL
5	1999 KR18	TNO	7.9	95 km	multiple	1999–2001	15 Nov 2001	21	Disc.: Cerro Tololo; LoUTNOs, res · 4:7	MPC · JPL

back to top

== L ==
U	Designation	Class	Physical		Observations				Description and notes	Ref
U	Designation	Class	H	D	Opp.	Arc	Last	Used	Description and notes	Ref
7	1999 LJ1	AMO	22.2	130 m	single	28 days	02 Jul 1999	41	Disc.: CSS	MPC · JPL
0	1999 LT1	AMO	18.04	1.1 km	multiple	1999–2025	30 Apr 2025	83	Disc.: LINEAR; NEO larger than 1 kilometer	MPC · JPL
2	1999 LW1	APO	20.3	310 m	multiple	1999–2018	10 Jun 2018	70	Disc.: CSS	MPC · JPL
9	1999 LX1	APO	20.6	270 m	single	6 days	14 Jun 1999	42	Disc.: LINEAR; Potentially hazardous object	MPC · JPL
8	1999 LD6	APO	22.1	140 m	single	3 days	13 Jun 1999	12	Disc.: LINEAR	MPC · JPL
1	1999 LE6	AMO	20.7	260 m	multiple	1999–2020	12 Jun 2020	83	Disc.: LINEAR	MPC · JPL
0	1999 LE7	MBA-M	18.17	1.1 km	multiple	1999–2025	22 Jun 2025	65	Disc.: Spacewatch; Added on 29 January 2022	MPC · JPL
0	1999 LV7	AMO	19.39	490 m	multiple	1999-2022	09 May 2022	105	Disc.: LINEAR	MPC · JPL
1	1999 LD30	AMO	20.3	310 m	multiple	1999–2004	10 Oct 2004	71	Disc.: LINEAR	MPC · JPL
2	1999 LC31	MBA-M	17.9	780 m	multiple	1999–2015	09 Jul 2015	36	Disc.: Spacewatch; Added on 17 January 2021; Alt.: 2015 MA1	MPC · JPL
E	1999 LB37	TNO	9.6	57 km	single	1 day	09 Jun 1999	4	Disc.: Palomar Obs. LoUTNOs, plutino?	MPC · JPL

back to top

== N ==
U	Designation	Class	Physical		Observations				Description and notes	Ref
U	Designation	Class	H	D	Opp.	Arc	Last	Used	Description and notes	Ref
0	1999 NZ4	MCA	17.88	1.4 km	multiple	1999-2023	12 Jun 2023	157	Disc.: LINEAR	MPC · JPL

back to top

== O ==
U	Designation	Class	Physical		Observations				Description and notes	Ref
U	Designation	Class	H	D	Opp.	Arc	Last	Used	Description and notes	Ref
0	1999 OQ3	AMO	20.19	340 m	multiple	1999–2025	25 Apr 2025	96	Disc.: LINEAR	MPC · JPL
5	1999 OZ3	TNO	7.4	110 km	multiple	1999–2022	27 Aug 2022	32	Disc.: Mauna Kea Obs. LoUTNOs, cubewano (cold)	MPC · JPL
3	1999 OA4	TNO	7.9	87 km	multiple	1999–2006	24 Jul 2006	27	Disc.: Mauna Kea Obs. LoUTNOs, cubewano (cold)	MPC · JPL
4	1999 OC4	TNO	8.3	73 km	multiple	1999–2001	25 Jul 2001	24	Disc.: Mauna Kea Obs. LoUTNOs, cubewano (cold)	MPC · JPL
4	1999 OD4	TNO	7.21	124 km	multiple	1999–2021	12 Sep 2021	44	Disc.: Mauna Kea Obs. LoUTNOs, cubewano?	MPC · JPL
5	1999 OG4	TNO	7.7	96 km	multiple	1999–2001	27 Jul 2001	18	Disc.: Mauna Kea Obs. LoUTNOs, cubewano (cold)	MPC · JPL
3	1999 OH4	TNO	8.3	91 km	multiple	1999–2006	03 Aug 2006	22	Disc.: Mauna Kea Obs. LoUTNOs, other TNO, BR-mag: 3.20	MPC · JPL
5	1999 OK4	TNO	7.57	126 km	multiple	1999–2015	05 Sep 2015	23	Disc.: Mauna Kea Obs. LoUTNOs, other TNO	MPC · JPL

back to top

== P ==
U	Designation	Class	Physical		Observations				Description and notes	Ref
U	Designation	Class	H	D	Opp.	Arc	Last	Used	Description and notes	Ref
1	1999 PP2	MBA-I	18.74	520 m	multiple	1999–2022	02 Oct 2022	38	Disc.: Spacewatch; Added on 17 January 2021	MPC · JPL
5	1999 PS3	AMO	21.7	160 m	single	57 days	06 Oct 1999	50	Disc.: LINEAR	MPC · JPL
1	1999 PL7	MBA-M	17.1	1.1 km	multiple	1979–2021	18 Jan 2021	107	Disc.: Palomar Obs. Alt.: 1979 SY, 2017 BU100	MPC · JPL
0	1999 PN9	MBA-M	18.2	960 m	multiple	1999–2019	04 Feb 2019	46	Disc.: Cerro Tololo	MPC · JPL

back to top

== Q ==
U	Designation	Class	Physical		Observations				Description and notes	Ref
U	Designation	Class	H	D	Opp.	Arc	Last	Used	Description and notes	Ref
0	1999 QS3	MBA-O	18.53	1.1 km	multiple	1999–2021	13 Sep 2021	31	Disc.: Astrovirtel; Alt.: 2005 UK464	MPC · JPL

back to top

== R ==
U	Designation	Class	Physical		Observations				Description and notes	Ref
U	Designation	Class	H	D	Opp.	Arc	Last	Used	Description and notes	Ref
5	1999 RU2	AMO	20.2	320 m	single	61 days	04 Nov 1999	140	Disc.: CSS	MPC · JPL
1	1999 RP4	MBA-I	18.7	550 m	multiple	1999–2022	24 May 2022	33	Disc.: Spacewatch	MPC · JPL
1	1999 RF5	MBA-I	19.1	450 m	multiple	1999–2019	25 Sep 2019	45	Disc.: Spacewatch; Added on 22 July 2020	MPC · JPL
2	1999 RN28	AMO	21.1	210 m	multiple	1999–2015	01 Nov 2015	99	Disc.: LINEAR	MPC · JPL
2	1999 RP28	AMO	22.5	110 m	multiple	1999-2024 days	09 May 2024	53	Disc.: CSS	MPC · JPL
1	1999 RQ28	AMO	20.7	260 m	multiple	1999–2008	20 Jan 2008	124	Disc.: LONEOS	MPC · JPL
7	1999 RZ31	AMO	23.8	62 m	single	14 days	21 Sep 1999	42	Disc.: LINEAR	MPC · JPL
0	1999 RA32	APO	21.33	200 m	multiple	1999–2026	03 Aug 2026	309	Disc.: LINEAR	MPC · JPL
0	1999 RB32	AMO	20.2	320 m	multiple	1999–2018	10 Dec 2018	363	Disc.: LINEAR	MPC · JPL
7	1999 RJ33	AMO	22.5	110 m	single	16 days	25 Sep 1999	33	Disc.: LINEAR	MPC · JPL
7	1999 RK33	AMO	22.4	120 m	single	10 days	19 Sep 1999	85	Disc.: LINEAR	MPC · JPL
5	1999 RO36	AMO	20.7	260 m	single	67 days	12 Nov 1999	144	Disc.: Farpoint Obs.	MPC · JPL
E	1999 RS214	TNO	7.9	90 km	single	33 days	09 Oct 1999	10	Disc.: Mauna Kea Obs. LoUTNOs, cubewano?	MPC · JPL
4	1999 RT214	TNO	7.79	100 km	multiple	1999–2021	08 Aug 2021	47	Disc.: Mauna Kea Obs. LoUTNOs, cubewano (cold), albedo: 0.210; binary: 69 km	MPC · JPL
3	1999 RU214	TNO	6.97	146 km	multiple	1999–2021	08 Aug 2021	23	Disc.: Mauna Kea Obs. LoUTNOs, res · 2:5	MPC · JPL
4	1999 RV214	TNO	7.9	87 km	multiple	1999–2015	28 May 2015	13	Disc.: Mauna Kea Obs. LoUTNOs, cubewano (cold)	MPC · JPL
3	1999 RW214	TNO	7.3	115 km	multiple	1998–2016	12 Aug 2016	29	Disc.: Mauna Kea Obs. LoUTNOs, cubewano (cold)	MPC · JPL
2	1999 RX214	TNO	6.8	145 km	multiple	1999–2017	24 Jul 2017	30	Disc.: Mauna Kea Obs. LoUTNOs, cubewano (cold), BR-mag: 1.63; taxonomy: IR	MPC · JPL
2	1999 RZ214	TNO	7.8	104 km	multiple	1999–2017	22 Sep 2017	17	Disc.: Mauna Kea Obs. LoUTNOs, SDO	MPC · JPL
2	1999 RB215	TNO	9.4	48 km	multiple	1999–2011	26 Oct 2011	23	Disc.: Mauna Kea Obs. LoUTNOs, twotino	MPC · JPL
E	1999 RF215	TNO	7.4	114 km	single	65 days	11 Nov 1999	8	Disc.: Mauna Kea Obs. LoUTNOs, cubewano?	MPC · JPL
4	1999 RG215	TNO	7.22	120 km	multiple	1999–2021	08 Aug 2021	33	Disc.: Mauna Kea Obs. LoUTNOs, cubewano (cold)	MPC · JPL
6	1999 RR215	TNO	8.1	80 km	multiple	1999–2000	28 Dec 2000	14	Disc.: Mauna Kea Obs. LoUTNOs, cubewano (cold)	MPC · JPL
E	1999 RT215	TNO	7.1	158 km	single	63 days	09 Nov 1999	9	Disc.: Mauna Kea Obs. LoUTNOs, other TNO	MPC · JPL
2	1999 RV215	TNO	8.4	87 km	multiple	1999–2014	22 Oct 2014	16	Disc.: Mauna Kea Obs. LoUTNOs, other TNO	MPC · JPL
5	1999 RW215	TNO	7.95	93 km	multiple	1999–2021	11 Jan 2021	21	Disc.: Mauna Kea Obs. LoUTNOs, res · 3:4	MPC · JPL
4	1999 RX215	TNO	7.6	100 km	multiple	1999–2022	27 Aug 2022	22	Disc.: Mauna Kea Obs. LoUTNOs, cubewano (cold)	MPC · JPL
E	1999 RC216	TNO	7.3	119 km	single	62 days	09 Nov 1999	10	Disc.: Mauna Kea Obs. LoUTNOs, cubewano?	MPC · JPL
0	1999 RV216	MBA-M	18.15	840 m	multiple	1999-2025	26 Dec 2025	46	Disc.: Spacewatch	MPC · JPL
1	1999 RB229	MCA	18.7	540 m	multiple	1999–2021	08 Jan 2021	129	Disc.: Piszkéstető Stn. Added on 19 October 2020	MPC · JPL
0	1999 RT250	MBA-M	18.01	1.1 km	multiple	1999–2021	02 Oct 2021	60	Disc.: Spacewatch	MPC · JPL
0	1999 RQ251	MBA-I	19.32	450 m	multiple	1999-2025	23 Oct 2025	47	Disc.: Spacewatch	MPC · JPL
0	1999 RU253	MBA-I	18.5	590 m	multiple	1999–2018	18 Jun 2018	46	Disc.: Spacewatch; Added on 22 July 2020	MPC · JPL
E	1999 RK257	TNO	8.3	91 km	single	1 day	13 Sep 1999	6	Disc.: Mauna Kea Obs. LoUTNOs, other TNO	MPC · JPL
0	1999 RS259	MBA-I	19.22	430 m	multiple	1999–2021	09 Dec 2021	37	Disc.: Spacewatch; Added on 21 August 2021	MPC · JPL
0	1999 RE260	MBA-I	18.73	570 m	multiple	1999–2023	17 Nov 2023	76	Disc.: Spacewatch	MPC · JPL
0	1999 RN260	MBA-I	18.29	650 m	multiple	1999–2022	27 Jan 2022	31	Disc.: Spacewatch	MPC · JPL
2	1999 RC261	MBA-I	19.3	410 m	multiple	1999–2020	23 Sep 2020	51	Disc.: Spacewatch; Added on 19 October 2020	MPC · JPL
0	1999 RF261	MBA-M	18.31	710 m	multiple	1999–2024	29 Sep 2024	50	Disc.: Spacewatch; Added on 17 January 2021	MPC · JPL

back to top
