= List of unnumbered minor planets: 1999 S–T =

This is a partial list of unnumbered minor planets for principal provisional designations assigned between 16 September and 15 October 1999. As of May 2026, a total of 111 bodies remain unnumbered for this period. Objects for this year are listed on the following pages: A–R · S–T and U–Y. Also see previous and next year.

Near-Earth obj.	MBA (inner)	MBA (outer)	Centaur
Mars-crosser	MBA (middle)	Jupiter trojan	Trans-Neptunian obj.
Unclassified

== S ==
U	Designation	Class	Physical		Observations				Description and notes	Ref
U	Designation	Class	H	D	Opp.	Arc	Last	Used	Description and notes	Ref
0	1999 SO	MBA-I	18.98	500 m	multiple	1999–2022	29 Nov 2022	36	Disc.: Spacewatch; Added on 11 May 2021; Alt.: 2014 PS86	MPC; JPL
2	1999 SK1	MBA-I	19.0	470 m	multiple	1999–2019	24 Aug 2019	43	Disc.: NRC	MPC; JPL
0	1999 SK5	MCA	18.19	680 m	multiple	1999-2022	02 Dec 2022	96	Disc.: LINEAR Alt.: 2022 SV2	MPC; JPL
0	1999 SE10	AMO	20.35	310 m	multiple	1999-2022	11 Oct 2022	110	Disc.: LINEAR	MPC; JPL
0	1999 SF10	APO	24.41	49 m	multiple	1999–2025	24 Dec 2025	77	Disc.: LINEAR	MPC; JPL
2	1999 SG10	APO	20.5	280 m	multiple	1999–2020	20 Oct 2020	115	Disc.: LINEAR; Potentially hazardous object	MPC; JPL
0	1999 SH10	APO	22.73	100 m	multiple	1999–2022	06 Jan 2022	85	Disc.: LINEAR	MPC; JPL
0	1999 SZ23	MBA-M	18.06	1.5 km	multiple	1999–2022	17 Nov 2022	74	Disc.: Spacewatch; Alt.: 2006 HX143	MPC; JPL
1	1999 SM25	MBA-M	18.44	1.0 km	multiple	1999–2025	25 Aug 2025	55	Disc.: 5Spacewatch; Added on 24 December 2021	MPC; JPL
E	1999 SA28	TNO	7.3	164 km	single	1 day	17 Sep 1999	6	Disc.: Mauna Kea Obs. LoUTNOs, plutino?	MPC; JPL

back to top

== T ==
U	Designation	Class	Physical		Observations				Description and notes	Ref
U	Designation	Class	H	D	Opp.	Arc	Last	Used	Description and notes	Ref
5	1999 TY2	APO	23.3	78 m	single	5 days	08 Oct 1999	114	Disc.: CSS	MPC; JPL
0	1999 TE3	MBA-O	16.9	2.3 km	multiple	1999-2021	11 Oct 2021	95	Disc.: Prescott Obs. Alt.: 2010 OS125	MPC; JPL
1	1999 TR4	HUN	18.3	650 m	multiple	1999–2020	09 Dec 2020	204	Disc.: LINEAR	MPC; JPL
0	1999 TA5	AMO	20.98	270 m	multiple	1999-2025	15 Sep 2025	70	Disc.: CSS	MPC; JPL
0	1999 TD5	AMO	19.4	470 m	multiple	1999–2022	28 Jul 2022	161	Disc.: LINEAR	MPC; JPL
2	1999 TE5	AMO	20.5	280 m	multiple	1999–2009	22 Oct 2009	71	Disc.: LINEAR	MPC; JPL
3	1999 TR11	TNO	8.43	99 km	multiple	1999–2025	23 Feb 2025	34	Disc.: Mauna Kea Obs. LoUTNOs, plutino, BR-mag: 1.77; taxonomy: RR	MPC; JPL
0	1999 TJ12	MCA	18.28	660 m	multiple	1999–2017	23 Dec 2017	190	Disc.: LINEAR	MPC; JPL
8	1999 TM12	APO	21.6	170 m	single	7 days	17 Oct 1999	43	Disc.: LINEAR	MPC; JPL
8	1999 TM13	AMO	23.7	65 m	single	13 days	18 Oct 1999	26	Disc.: LINEAR	MPC; JPL
5	1999 TN13	APO	23.6	68 m	single	7 days	18 Oct 1999	65	Disc.: LINEAR	MPC; JPL
7	1999 TO13	APO	21.4	190 m	single	11 days	23 Oct 1999	98	Disc.: LINEAR; Potentially hazardous object	MPC; JPL
0	1999 TT16	APO	19.77	390 m	multiple	1999–2019	27 May 2019	194	Disc.: Spacewatch; Potentially hazardous object	MPC; JPL
7	1999 TU16	AMO	22.1	140 m	single	19 days	30 Oct 1999	28	Disc.: Spacewatch	MPC; JPL
6	1999 TV16	APO	23.4	74 m	single	6 days	18 Oct 1999	64	Disc.: LINEAR	MPC; JPL
0	1999 TW16	APO	19.51	450 m	multiple	1999–2021	03 Dec 2021	196	Disc.: LINEAR	MPC; JPL
4	1999 TM23	MCA	19.7	340 m	multiple	1999–2019	02 Nov 2019	27	Disc.: Spacewatch; Added on 17 June 2021; Alt.: 2009 SN405	MPC; JPL
E	1999 TS23	MBA-M	17.9	1.5 km	single	4 days	07 Oct 1999	9	Disc.: LINEAR	MPC; JPL
2	1999 TB24	MBA-I	19.31	450 m	multiple	1999–2021	30 Nov 2021	39	Disc.: LINEAR	MPC; JPL
2	1999 TE24	MBA-I	19.0	470 m	multiple	1999–2020	14 Sep 2020	57	Disc.: LINEAR; Alt.: 2013 RQ25	MPC; JPL
0	1999 TB41	MBA-M	18.3	920 m	multiple	1999–2020	11 Sep 2020	42	Disc.: Spacewatch	MPC; JPL
0	1999 TE42	MBA-M	17.7	940 m	multiple	1999–2024	12 Aug 2024	142	Disc.: Spacewatch	MPC; JPL
2	1999 TT43	MBA-I	18.7	540 m	multiple	1999–2018	17 Nov 2018	36	Disc.: Spacewatch	MPC; JPL
1	1999 TV43	MCA	19.23	450 m	multiple	1999–2026	05 Sep 2026	54	Disc.: Spacewatch; Added on 19 October 2020	MPC; JPL
0	1999 TB44	MBA-I	19.06	490 m	multiple	1999–2024	29 Sep 2024	47	Disc.: Spacewatch	MPC; JPL
1	1999 TD45	MBA-I	19.13	440 m	multiple	1999–2021	07 Nov 2021	56	Disc.: Spacewatch; Alt.: 2010 UX39	MPC; JPL
0	1999 TQ45	MBA-I	18.89	500 m	multiple	1999–2021	25 Nov 2021	61	Disc.: Spacewatch	MPC; JPL
1	1999 TE46	MBA-I	19.18	570 m	multiple	1999–2024	21 Dec 2024	49	Disc.: Spacewatch	MPC; JPL
2	1999 TK46	MBA-I	19.3	410 m	multiple	1999–2019	29 Sep 2019	30	Disc.: Spacewatch; Added on 17 January 2021	MPC; JPL
0	1999 TN47	MBA-O	17.5	1.8 km	multiple	1999–2021	30 Nov 2021	54	Disc.: Spacewatch; Added on 29 January 2022	MPC; JPL
1	1999 TT47	MBA-O	18.21	1.3 km	multiple	1999–2021	25 Nov 2021	33	Disc.: Spacewatch; Added on 24 December 2021	MPC; JPL
1	1999 TJ50	MBA-M	18.61	1.1 km	multiple	1999–2021	04 Aug 2021	30	Disc.: Spacewatch; Added on 24 December 2021	MPC; JPL
1	1999 TF51	MBA-O	18.43	1.3 km	multiple	1999–2024	05 Sep 2024	57	Disc.: Spacewatch	MPC; JPL
2	1999 TU51	MBA-M	18.4	620 m	multiple	1999–2019	19 Oct 2019	33	Disc.: Spacewatch; Added on 21 August 2021	MPC; JPL
2	1999 TA52	MBA-I	19.0	470 m	multiple	1999–2020	16 Nov 2020	79	Disc.: Spacewatch; Alt.: 2013 RE86	MPC; JPL
0	1999 TA63	MBA-M	17.58	1.3 km	multiple	1999–2024	29 Sep 2024	73	Disc.: Spacewatch	MPC; JPL
3	1999 TA66	MBA-O	17.0	2.2 km	multiple	1999–2021	09 Jan 2021	33	Disc.: Spacewatch; Added on 17 January 2021	MPC; JPL
2	1999 TO66	MBA-I	19.0	470 m	multiple	1999–2020	15 Oct 2020	64	Disc.: Spacewatch; Added on 19 October 2020	MPC; JPL
1	1999 TU70	MBA-I	18.2	680 m	multiple	1999–2019	02 Jan 2019	50	Disc.: Spacewatch; Alt.: 2014 QM406	MPC; JPL
1	1999 TO71	MBA-I	18.9	490 m	multiple	1999–2017	27 Nov 2017	26	Disc.: Spacewatch; Added on 29 January 2022	MPC; JPL
0	1999 TZ71	MBA-I	19.15	440 m	multiple	1999–2021	28 Nov 2021	34	Disc.: Spacewatch	MPC; JPL
0	1999 TG72	MBA-M	18.9	700 m	multiple	1999–2020	11 Oct 2020	47	Disc.: Spacewatch	MPC; JPL
2	1999 TC73	MBA-I	19.3	410 m	multiple	1999–2020	17 Oct 2020	49	Disc.: Spacewatch; Alt.: 2013 RU142	MPC; JPL
3	1999 TR73	MBA-I	19.5	370 m	multiple	1999–2019	26 Nov 2019	33	Disc.: Spacewatch; Added on 11 May 2021; Alt.: 2009 SH407	MPC; JPL
2	1999 TM74	MBA-I	19.0	470 m	multiple	1999–2020	16 Sep 2020	66	Disc.: Spacewatch; Alt.: 2006 SG213	MPC; JPL
1	1999 TZ75	MBA-I	19.50	370 m	multiple	1999–2019	02 Nov 2019	27	Disc.: Spacewatch; Added on 24 December 2021	MPC; JPL
4	1999 TB77	MBA-I	19.6	360 m	multiple	1999–2016	07 Nov 2016	18	Disc.: Spacewatch; Added on 21 August 2021	MPC; JPL
1	1999 TK128	MBA-M	17.7	1.2 km	multiple	1999–2020	20 Oct 2020	49	Disc.: LINEAR	MPC; JPL
0	1999 TV174	MBA-M	17.69	1.2 km	multiple	1999–2021	27 Nov 2021	91	Disc.: LINEAR; Added on 5 November 2021	MPC; JPL
0	1999 TK212	MBA-M	17.63	1.8 km	multiple	1999–2026	06 Nov 2026	236	Disc.: LINEAR; Alt.: 2008 UC200	MPC; JPL
0	1999 TM216	MCA	18.92	490 m	multiple	1999–2021	27 Nov 2021	87	Disc.: LINEAR; Alt.: 2010 QF1	MPC; JPL
1	1999 TU218	MBA-M	17.6	1.7 km	multiple	1999–2020	19 Apr 2020	61	Disc.: LINEAR	MPC; JPL
1	1999 TR226	MBA-M	18.2	960 m	multiple	1999–2016	02 Oct 2016	48	Disc.: Spacewatch; Alt.: 2012 VK104	MPC; JPL
1	1999 TB238	MBA-M	17.3	1.5 km	multiple	1999–2016	14 Nov 2016	54	Disc.: CSS; Alt.: 2012 TA140, 2016 SB3	MPC; JPL
0	1999 TX254	MBA-M	17.88	1.5 km	multiple	1999–2021	30 May 2021	34	Disc.: LINEAR	MPC; JPL
3	1999 TJ255	MBA-M	18.9	490 m	multiple	1999–2003	24 Oct 2003	14	Disc.: Spacewatch	MPC; JPL
0	1999 TE277	MBA-O	17.45	1.8 km	multiple	1999–2021	29 Oct 2021	59	Disc.: LINEAR; Added on 30 September 2021; Alt.: 2010 ST61	MPC; JPL
0	1999 TG277	MBA-O	17.36	1.9 km	multiple	1999–2021	29 Oct 2021	66	Disc.: LINEAR; Added on 5 November 2021; Alt.: 2010 TB42, 2021 RK91	MPC; JPL
0	1999 TU281	MBA-O	16.7	2.5 km	multiple	1999–2018	12 Jan 2018	30	Disc.: LINEAR	MPC; JPL
4	1999 TV293	MBA-I	19.2	430 m	multiple	1999–2016	19 Nov 2016	22	Disc.: Spacewatch; Added on 22 July 2020; Alt.: 2016 TG85	MPC; JPL
1	1999 TW293	MBA-I	18.5	590 m	multiple	1999–2017	13 Nov 2017	42	Disc.: Spacewatch; Added on 22 July 2020	MPC; JPL
1	1999 TN299	MBA-M	17.65	1.6 km	multiple	1999–2021	17 Jul 2021	58	Disc.: Spacewatch; Alt.: 2008 TD74	MPC; JPL
0	1999 TO299	MBA-I	18.72	540 m	multiple	1999–2022	07 Jan 2022	49	Disc.: Spacewatch	MPC; JPL
2	1999 TH300	MBA-M	18.3	920 m	multiple	1999–2016	09 Jul 2016	21	Disc.: Spacewatch	MPC; JPL
2	1999 TJ300	MBA-M	18.56	590 m	multiple	1999-2024	03 Oct 2024	23	Disc.: Spacewatch	MPC; JPL
3	1999 TN301	MBA-I	19.1	450 m	multiple	1999–2017	13 Nov 2017	33	Disc.: Spacewatch	MPC; JPL
0	1999 TP302	MBA-I	19.08	450 m	multiple	1999–2017	28 Sep 2017	43	Disc.: Spacewatch; Alt.: 2005 EK303	MPC; JPL
3	1999 TD303	MBA-M	18.4	620 m	multiple	1999–2019	31 May 2019	32	Disc.: Spacewatch	MPC; JPL
1	1999 TJ303	MBA-I	19.25	450 m	multiple	1999–2024	04 Sep 2024	43	Disc.: Spacewatch	MPC; JPL
3	1999 TX305	MBA-M	18.71	540 m	multiple	1995-2003	24 Oct 2003	14	Disc.: Spacewatch	MPC; JPL
0	1999 TT308	MBA-I	18.52	590 m	multiple	1999–2021	29 Nov 2021	74	Disc.: Spacewatch	MPC; JPL
0	1999 TL309	MBA-O	17.5	1.8 km	multiple	1999–2020	08 Nov 2020	66	Disc.: Spacewatch; Alt.: 2015 RR208	MPC; JPL
1	1999 TV309	MBA-M	18.48	1.2 km	multiple	1999–2026	12 Aug 2026	58	Disc.: Spacewatch	MPC; JPL
0	1999 TW309	MBA-I	18.91	490 m	multiple	1999-2017	16 Oct 2017	34	Disc.: Spacewatch; Alt.: 1999 TT334	MPC; JPL
1	1999 TD312	MBA-I	18.8	520 m	multiple	1999–2019	25 Oct 2019	75	Disc.: Spacewatch; Alt.: 2019 NZ13	MPC; JPL
2	1999 TN312	MBA-I	19.1	450 m	multiple	1999–2020	14 Nov 2020	66	Disc.: Spacewatch; Added on 30 September 2021; Alt.: 2006 SR292	MPC; JPL
1	1999 TT312	MBA-I	18.7	540 m	multiple	1999–2020	24 Mar 2020	23	Disc.: Spacewatch; Alt.: 2012 UE166	MPC; JPL
0	1999 TA314	MBA-I	19.04	460 m	multiple	1999–2021	14 Aug 2021	70	Disc.: Spacewatch	MPC; JPL
0	1999 TC322	MCA	19.41	450 m	multiple	1999–2024	09 Aug 2024	25	Disc.: CSS	MPC; JPL
0	1999 TC326	MBA-O	17.1	2.1 km	multiple	1999–2021	10 Oct 2021	109	Disc.: Spacewatch; Added on 22 July 2020; Alt.: 2010 LF123	MPC; JPL
1	1999 TL329	MBA-O	17.88	1.5 km	multiple	1999–2021	08 Nov 2021	30	Disc.: SDSS; Added on 5 November 2021; Alt.: 2010 NL137, 2021 RY102	MPC; JPL
3	1999 TK330	MBA-M	18.7	1.0 km	multiple	1999–2017	24 Sep 2017	26	Disc.: SDSS; Added on 21 August 2021	MPC; JPL
0	1999 TQ330	MBA-I	18.80	520 m	multiple	1999–2022	07 Jan 2022	52	Disc.: SDSS; Alt.: 2015 BN291	MPC; JPL
0	1999 TR330	MCA	18.4	620 m	multiple	1999–2020	28 Apr 2020	48	Disc.: SDSS	MPC; JPL
0	1999 TZ330	MBA-I	18.8	520 m	multiple	1999–2020	11 Nov 2020	45	Disc.: SDSS	MPC; JPL
2	1999 TC331	MBA-I	19.95	300 m	multiple	1999–2019	28 Aug 2019	19	Disc.: SDSS; Added on 21 August 2021; Alt.: 2019 NZ66	MPC; JPL
1	1999 TP331	MBA-O	17.7	1.6 km	multiple	1999–2019	25 Jul 2019	38	Disc.: SDSS	MPC; JPL
1	1999 TX332	MBA-I	20.02	290 m	multiple	1999–2021	15 Nov 2021	30	Disc.: SDSS; Added on 29 January 2022	MPC; JPL
0	1999 TD333	MBA-M	18.3	650 m	multiple	1999–2020	17 Dec 2020	24	Disc.: SDSS	MPC; JPL
1	1999 TT336	MBA-I	18.8	520 m	multiple	1999–2017	19 Oct 2017	20	Disc.: SDSS	MPC; JPL
0	1999 TA339	MBA-M	18.06	1.4 km	multiple	1999–2021	31 Aug 2021	57	Disc.: Spacewatch	MPC; JPL
1	1999 TT339	MBA-I	18.14	700 m	multiple	1999–2021	17 Apr 2021	48	Disc.: SDSS	MPC; JPL
0	1999 TC340	MBA-I	18.9	490 m	multiple	1999–2019	07 Jul 2019	53	Disc.: Spacewatch	MPC; JPL
2	1999 TH340	MBA-I	18.4	620 m	multiple	1999–2018	08 Nov 2018	27	Disc.: Spacewatch	MPC; JPL
0	1999 TX341	MBA-I	18.55	580 m	multiple	1999–2021	24 Nov 2021	54	Disc.: SDSS	MPC; JPL
3	1999 TC342	MBA-M	18.5	590 m	multiple	1999–2015	17 Aug 2015	25	Disc.: Spacewatch	MPC; JPL
0	1999 TJ342	MBA-M	18.7	1 km	multiple	1999–2022	22 Nov 2022	65	Disc.: SDSS	MPC; JPL
2	1999 TS342	MBA-I	19.6	360 m	multiple	1999–2020	22 Sep 2020	34	Disc.: SDSS; Added on 17 January 2021	MPC; JPL
1	1999 TB343	MBA-M	18.4	620 m	multiple	1999–2020	15 Oct 2020	27	Disc.: SDSS; Added on 11 May 2021	MPC; JPL
0	1999 TF343	MBA-M	18.51	830 m	multiple	1999–2021	07 Nov 2021	43	Disc.: SDSS; Added on 30 September 2021	MPC; JPL
0	1999 TJ343	MBA-O	17.66	1.8 km	multiple	1999–2025	15 Oct 2025	27	Disc.: Spacewatch; Added on 29 January 2022	MPC; JPL

back to top
