= List of unnumbered minor planets: 1999 U–Y =

This is a partial list of unnumbered minor planets for principal provisional designations assigned between 16 October and 31 December 1999. As of May 2026, a total of 95 bodies remain unnumbered for this period. Objects for this year are listed on the following pages: A–R · S–T and U–Y. Also see previous and next year.

Near-Earth obj.	MBA (inner)	MBA (outer)	Centaur
Mars-crosser	MBA (middle)	Jupiter trojan	Trans-Neptunian obj.
Unclassified

== U ==
U	Designation	Class	Physical		Observations				Description and notes	Ref
U	Designation	Class	H	D	Opp.	Arc	Last	Used	Description and notes	Ref
0	1999 UQ	AMO	21.88	160 m	multiple	1999–2023	10 Jun 2023	113	Disc.: LINEAR	MPC · JPL
1	1999 UR	APO	21.5	180 m	multiple	1999–2013	13 Feb 2013	76	Disc.: LINEAR; Potentially hazardous object	MPC · JPL
–	1999 UZ5	APO	21.8	160 m	single	4 days	04 Nov 1999	32	Disc.: CSS	MPC · JPL
1	1999 UD18	MBA-M	18.5	590 m	multiple	1999–2020	14 Nov 2020	34	Disc.: Spacewatch	MPC · JPL
1	1999 UH20	MBA-I	18.8	520 m	multiple	1999–2020	19 Oct 2020	97	Disc.: Spacewatch	MPC · JPL
1	1999 UL31	MBA-M	18.42	590 m	multiple	1999–2025	20 Feb 2025	58	Disc.: Spacewatch; Added on 11 May 2021	MPC · JPL
0	1999 UZ33	MBA-I	18.5	590 m	multiple	1999–2020	27 Jan 2020	39	Disc.: Spacewatch; Alt.: 2007 YA17	MPC · JPL
1	1999 UU39	MBA-I	19.21	430 m	multiple	1999-2022	23 Oct 2022	55	Disc.: Spacewatch Alt.: 2022 SZ26	MPC · JPL
3	1999 UV39	MBA-I	19.3	410 m	multiple	1999–2016	05 Nov 2016	27	Disc.: Spacewatch	MPC · JPL
2	1999 UB41	MBA-I	18.6	570 m	multiple	1999–2021	24 Sep 2021	40	Disc.: Spacewatch	MPC · JPL
0	1999 UA58	MBA-I	19.04	460 m	multiple	1999–2021	25 Nov 2021	78	Disc.: Spacewatch; Alt.: 2017 QX18	MPC · JPL
3	1999 UP58	MBA-I	19.0	470 m	multiple	1992–2017	13 Dec 2017	40	Disc.: Spacewatch; Alt.: 1992 WR7	MPC · JPL
0	1999 UY58	MBA-I	18.85	500 m	multiple	1999–2021	08 Dec 2021	54	Disc.: Spacewatch	MPC · JPL
0	1999 UQ66	MBA-I	18.90	490 m	multiple	1999–2021	07 Nov 2021	41	Disc.: Spacewatch	MPC · JPL
2	1999 UT66	MBA-M	18.57	580 m	multiple	1999–2023	10 Sep 2023	40	Disc.: Spacewatch; Added on 22 July 2020	MPC · JPL
2	1999 UU66	MBA-I	19.6	360 m	multiple	1999–2020	23 Nov 2020	56	Disc.: Spacewatch; Added on 17 January 2021	MPC · JPL

back to top

== V ==
U	Designation	Class	Physical		Observations				Description and notes	Ref
U	Designation	Class	H	D	Opp.	Arc	Last	Used	Description and notes	Ref
2	1999 VT	AMO	19.7	410 m	multiple	1999–2019	08 Nov 2019	175	Disc.: CSS	MPC · JPL
0	1999 VL1	MCA	19.69	410 m	multiple	1999-2022	26 Nov 2022	109	Disc.: CSS	MPC · JPL
–	1999 VQ5	MCA	19.4	390 m	single	10 days	14 Nov 1999	78	Disc.: LINEAR	MPC · JPL
7	1999 VN11	AMO	20.3	310 m	single	8 days	14 Nov 1999	71	Disc.: LINEAR	MPC · JPL
–	1999 VK12	APO	23.7	65 m	single	3 days	12 Nov 1999	16	Disc.: LINEAR	MPC · JPL
0	1999 VS14	MBA-M	18.41	870 m	multiple	1999–2016	25 Oct 2016	26	Disc.: Kitt Peak Obs. Added on 29 January 2022	MPC · JPL
2	1999 VC16	MBA-I	18.7	540 m	multiple	1999–2020	16 Nov 2020	69	Disc.: Spacewatch; Alt.: 2006 SN368	MPC · JPL
0	1999 VP16	MBA-O	17.32	1.9 km	multiple	1999–2021	06 Nov 2021	58	Disc.: Spacewatch	MPC · JPL
0	1999 VU18	MBA-I	19.59	360 m	multiple	1999–2021	30 Nov 2021	69	Disc.: Spacewatch	MPC · JPL
7	1999 VU25	AMO	23.8	62 m	single	4 days	15 Nov 1999	13	Disc.: LINEAR	MPC · JPL
7	1999 VV25	APO	25.1	34 m	single	3 days	17 Nov 1999	27	Disc.: LINEAR	MPC · JPL
–	1999 VW25	ATE	25.3	31 m	single	3 days	17 Nov 1999	31	Disc.: LINEAR	MPC · JPL
7	1999 VX25	ATE	26.7	16 m	single	5 days	20 Nov 1999	40	Disc.: LINEAR	MPC · JPL
–	1999 VX39	MBA-M	18.2	680 m	single	8 days	12 Nov 1999	9	Disc.: Spacewatch	MPC · JPL
3	1999 VB41	MBA-I	19.0	470 m	multiple	1999–2020	26 Sep 2020	40	Disc.: Spacewatch; Alt.: 2020 PJ36	MPC · JPL
0	1999 VF73	MCA	19.9	440 m	multiple	1999–2020	12 Sep 2020	70	Disc.: Spacewatch; Alt.: 2013 AG150	MPC · JPL
0	1999 VM74	MCA	19.5	550 m	multiple	1999–2024	30 Sep 2024	40	Disc.: Spacewatch; Added on 17 June 2021; Alt.: 2020 TJ43	MPC · JPL
1	1999 VE76	HIL	16.8	2.4 km	multiple	1999–2015	06 Dec 2015	28	Disc.: Spacewatch	MPC · JPL
2	1999 VX83	MBA-I	19.6	360 m	multiple	1999–2020	17 Oct 2020	61	Disc.: Spacewatch	MPC · JPL
0	1999 VM116	MBA-M	18.4	880 m	multiple	1996–2021	30 Nov 2021	46	Disc.: Spacewatch; Added on 24 December 2021	MPC · JPL
1	1999 VP118	MBA-M	18.86	450 m	multiple	1999–2024	02 Oct 2024	47	Disc.: Spacewatch	MPC · JPL
0	1999 VU118	MBA-O	17.81	1.5 km	multiple	1999–2022	04 Jan 2022	50	Disc.: Spacewatch; Alt.: 2015 UX37	MPC · JPL
1	1999 VN121	MBA-M	19.3	580 m	multiple	1999–2021	26 Oct 2021	30	Disc.: Spacewatch; Added on 29 January 2022	MPC · JPL
0	1999 VO121	MBA-O	18.07	1.3 km	multiple	1999-2021	09 Dec 2021	53	Disc.: Spacewatch	MPC · JPL
0	1999 VS122	MBA-M	17.9	780 m	multiple	1999–2020	23 Dec 2020	49	Disc.: Spacewatch	MPC · JPL
3	1999 VH125	MBA-O	17.4	1.8 km	multiple	1999–2020	23 Nov 2020	24	Disc.: Spacewatch; Added on 17 January 2021	MPC · JPL
1	1999 VN125	MBA-M	19.0	470 m	multiple	1999–2020	07 Dec 2020	32	Disc.: Spacewatch	MPC · JPL
2	1999 VG128	MBA-M	18.0	1.4 km	multiple	1999–2017	24 Oct 2017	57	Disc.: Spacewatch; Alt.: 2008 SX189	MPC · JPL
0	1999 VW128	MBA-M	18.00	1.4 km	multiple	1999–2021	13 Sep 2021	30	Disc.: Spacewatch	MPC · JPL
2	1999 VS134	MBA-M	18.3	920 m	multiple	1999–2020	08 Dec 2020	47	Disc.: Spacewatch; Added on 11 May 2021; Alt.: 2016 WN66	MPC · JPL
0	1999 VT134	MBA-O	18.1	1.3 km	multiple	1999–2020	05 Nov 2020	39	Disc.: Spacewatch; Added on 17 January 2021	MPC · JPL
1	1999 VE135	MBA-M	18.9	700 m	multiple	1999–2016	06 Oct 2016	24	Disc.: Spacewatch	MPC · JPL
0	1999 VO139	MBA-I	19.93	330 m	multiple	1999–2020	05 Nov 2020	53	Disc.: Spacewatch; Alt.: 2020 RD44	MPC · JPL
1	1999 VX139	MBA-O	17.60	1.7 km	multiple	1999–2021	06 Nov 2021	48	Disc.: Spacewatch; Added on 5 November 2021	MPC · JPL
1	1999 VN140	MBA-O	17.4	1.8 km	multiple	1999–2015	19 Dec 2015	36	Disc.: Spacewatch; Alt.: 2007 VA256	MPC · JPL
0	1999 VA142	MBA-M	18.32	910 m	multiple	1999–2020	16 Nov 2020	83	Disc.: Spacewatch; Alt.: 2016 TH88	MPC · JPL
1	1999 VJ152	MBA-M	19.1	640 m	multiple	1999–2020	10 Oct 2020	46	Disc.: Spacewatch; Alt.: 2016 WO64	MPC · JPL
1	1999 VR152	MBA-M	17.9	1.1 km	multiple	1999–2020	16 Nov 2020	52	Disc.: Spacewatch; Added on 17 January 2021	MPC · JPL
2	1999 VS152	MBA-O	17.9	1.5 km	multiple	1999–2019	03 Dec 2019	33	Disc.: Spacewatch; Added on 11 May 2021; Alt.: 2019 VP14	MPC · JPL
1	1999 VU175	MBA-M	18.73	520 m	multiple	1999-2024	23 Dec 2024	60	Disc.: Spacewatch; Alt.: 2024 SR21	MPC · JPL
0	1999 VX213	MCA	19.11	490 m	multiple	1999–2026	12 Jun 2026	59	Disc.: LINEAR; Added on 17 June 2021	MPC · JPL
2	1999 VA217	MBA-M	18.4	620 m	multiple	1999–2021	08 Jan 2021	27	Disc.: Spacewatch; Added on 9 March 2021; Alt.: 2007 RL18	MPC · JPL
2	1999 VX217	MBA-I	19.4	390 m	multiple	1999–2019	27 Oct 2019	41	Disc.: Spacewatch; Added on 17 January 2021; Alt.: 2009 SK406, 2019 SK62	MPC · JPL
1	1999 VM222	MBA-M	18.1	1.3 km	multiple	1999–2017	25 Oct 2017	32	Disc.: Spacewatch	MPC · JPL
0	1999 VN228	MBA-I	18.8	500 m	multiple	1995–2022	17 Sep 2022	61	Disc.: Spacewatch	MPC · JPL
0	1999 VC233	MBA-I	19.18	430 m	multiple	1999–2021	14 Nov 2021	58	Disc.: Spacewatch	MPC · JPL
0	1999 VR233	HUN	19.17	440 m	multiple	1999–2021	13 Oct 2021	45	Disc.: Spacewatch	MPC · JPL
2	1999 VC234	MBA-O	17.5	1.8 km	multiple	1999–2019	01 Oct 2019	33	Disc.: Spacewatch	MPC · JPL
0	1999 VD234	MBA-O	17.6	1.7 km	multiple	1999–2020	31 Jan 2020	35	Disc.: Spacewatch; Added on 22 July 2020	MPC · JPL
2	1999 VF234	MBA-I	18.7	540 m	multiple	1999–2021	06 Jan 2021	96	Disc.: Spacewatch; Added on 17 January 2021	MPC · JPL
1	1999 VG234	MBA-O	18.05	1.5 km	multiple	1999–2025	12 Oct 2025	54	Disc.: Spacewatch; Added on 17 January 2021	MPC · JPL
0	1999 VH234	MBA-M	18.75	760 m	multiple	1999–2024	11 Sep 2024	47	Disc.: Spacewatch; Added on 17 January 2021	MPC · JPL
1	1999 VL234	MCA	19.54	360 m	multiple	1999–2022	06 Feb 2022	22	Disc.: Spacewatch; Added on 24 December 2021	MPC · JPL

back to top

== W ==
U	Designation	Class	Physical		Observations				Description and notes	Ref
U	Designation	Class	H	D	Opp.	Arc	Last	Used	Description and notes	Ref
0	1999 WX10	MBA-O	17.72	1.6 km	multiple	1999–2021	26 Nov 2021	45	Disc.: Spacewatch	MPC · JPL
–	1999 WM19	MBA-M	18.6	570 m	single	13 days	13 Dec 1999	9	Disc.: Spacewatch	MPC · JPL
0	1999 WY21	MBA-M	17.97	1.4 km	multiple	1999–2021	10 Sep 2021	38	Disc.: Spacewatch	MPC · JPL
0	1999 WU22	MBA-I	18.93	490 m	multiple	1999–2021	07 Nov 2021	54	Disc.: Spacewatch	MPC · JPL
3	1999 WD23	MBA-M	19.9	440 m	multiple	1999–2020	05 Nov 2020	24	Disc.: Spacewatch; Added on 17 June 2021; Alt.: 2020 UT40	MPC · JPL
1	1999 WL25	MBA-O	18.73	1.0 km	multiple	1999–2021	15 Apr 2021	26	Disc.: Spacewatch; Added on 17 June 2021; Alt.: 2019 UT58	MPC · JPL
0	1999 WR28	MBA-I	18.7	540 m	multiple	1999–2020	23 Jun 2020	48	Disc.: Spacewatch	MPC · JPL
1	1999 WT28	MBA-I	19.3	410 m	multiple	1999–2019	15 Nov 2019	66	Disc.: Spacewatch	MPC · JPL

back to top

== X ==
U	Designation	Class	Physical		Observations				Description and notes	Ref
U	Designation	Class	H	D	Opp.	Arc	Last	Used	Description and notes	Ref
2	1999 XS35	CEN	17.2	2.2 km	single	88 days	28 Feb 2000	206	Disc.: LONEOS; Potentially hazardous object NEO larger than 1 kilometer APO at MPC	MPC · JPL
0	1999 XO135	MCA	16.80	2.4 km	multiple	1999–2022	15 Jan 2022	172	Disc.: LINEAR	MPC · JPL
0	1999 XK136	APO	20.55	811 m	multiple	1999–2022	06 Jan 2022	139	Disc.: LINEAR; Potentially hazardous object	MPC · JPL
5	1999 XN141	APO	22.6	110 m	single	16 days	30 Dec 1999	18	Disc.: LINEAR	MPC · JPL
0	1999 XX146	MBA-O	17.43	1.8 km	multiple	1999–2021	27 Nov 2021	64	Disc.: Spacewatch; Added on 5 November 2021	MPC · JPL
0	1999 XA148	MBA-O	17.17	2.0 km	multiple	1999–2022	06 Jan 2022	63	Disc.: Spacewatch; Added on 17 January 2021	MPC · JPL
0	1999 XX148	HUN	18.96	490 m	multiple	1999–2024	07 Jun 2024	47	Disc.: Spacewatch	MPC · JPL
1	1999 XW232	MBA-M	17.4	980 m	multiple	1999–2021	07 Feb 2021	65	Disc.: LINEAR; Added on 11 May 2021; Alt.: 2015 PX56	MPC · JPL
1	1999 XK251	MBA-O	17.65	1.6 km	multiple	1999–2021	06 Jul 2021	39	Disc.: Spacewatch; Alt.: 2016 XF10	MPC · JPL
0	1999 XF254	MBA-I	19.1	450 m	multiple	1999–2020	18 Aug 2020	37	Disc.: Spacewatch	MPC · JPL
1	1999 XF266	MBA-I	19.3	410 m	multiple	1999–2020	11 Aug 2020	31	Disc.: Spacewatch	MPC · JPL

back to top

== Y ==
U	Designation	Class	Physical		Observations				Description and notes	Ref
U	Designation	Class	H	D	Opp.	Arc	Last	Used	Description and notes	Ref
4	1999 YD	APO	21.1	210 m	single	71 days	26 Feb 2000	99	Disc.: LINEAR; Potentially hazardous object AMO at MPC	MPC · JPL
0	1999 YE3	MCA	16.72	1.9 km	multiple	1999–2021	03 Apr 2021	232	Disc.: LINEAR	MPC · JPL
0	1999 YE19	MBA-O	17.3	1.9 km	multiple	1999–2018	17 Aug 2018	36	Disc.: Mauna Kea Obs. Added on 22 July 2020	MPC · JPL
4	1999 YP20	MBA-O	17.6	1.7 km	multiple	1999–2020	17 Nov 2020	16	Disc.: Mauna Kea Obs. Added on 11 May 2021; Alt.: 2020 UM39	MPC · JPL
1	1999 YD21	MBA-M	18.25	1.2 km	multiple	1999–2021	02 Oct 2021	26	Disc.: Mauna Kea Obs. Added on 17 June 2021	MPC · JPL
1	1999 YP30	MBA-I	18.6	570 m	multiple	1999–2019	19 Sep 2019	47	Disc.: Spacewatch	MPC · JPL
2	1999 YR30	MBA-I	18.8	520 m	multiple	1999–2021	16 Jan 2021	51	Disc.: Spacewatch; Added on 17 January 2021	MPC · JPL

back to top
