= 2007 TU24 =

Near-Earth asteroid

2007 TU_{24}
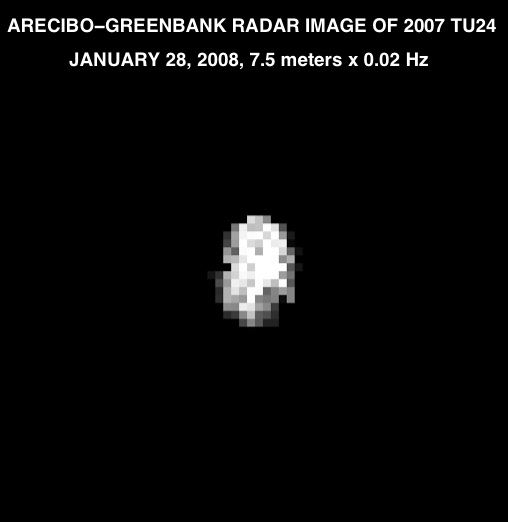
- Radar image of 2007 TU_{24}

Discovery
- Discovered by: Catalina Sky Survey
- Discovery date: 11 October 2007

Designations
- Minor planet category: Apollo; NEO; PHA

Orbital characteristics
- Epoch 21 November 2025 (JD 2461000.5)
- Uncertainty parameter 0
- Observation arc: 3,492 days (9.56 yr)
- Aphelion: 3.1334 AU (468.75 Gm)
- Perihelion: 0.95375 AU (142.679 Gm)
- Semi-major axis: 2.0436 AU (305.72 Gm)
- Eccentricity: 0.53330
- Orbital period (sidereal): 2.92 yr (1067.1 d)
- Mean anomaly: 42.684°
- Mean motion: 0° 20^{m} 15.144^{s} / day
- Inclination: 5.6256°
- Longitude of ascending node: 126.970°
- Argument of perihelion: 334.325°
- Earth MOID: 0.00133656 AU (199,947 km)
- Jupiter MOID: 2.0715 AU (309.89 Gm)

Physical characteristics
- Dimensions: ~250 meters
- Mass: < 2.4×10^{10} kg
- Mean density: unknown
- Equatorial surface gravity: unknown
- Equatorial escape velocity: < 0.58 km/h
- Synodic rotation period: 26 h (1.1 d)
- Geometric albedo: 0.24
| Surface temp. | min | mean | max |
|---|---|---|---|
| Kelvin | | unknown |
- Absolute magnitude (H): 20.2; 20.32

2007 TU_{24} is an Apollo near-Earth asteroid that was discovered by the Catalina Sky Survey in Arizona on 11 October 2007. Imaging radar has estimated that it is 250 meters (820 ft) in diameter. The asteroid passed 554,209 kilometer (344,370 mile or 1.4-lunar distance) from Earth on 29 January 2008 at 08:33 UTC. (At the time of the passage it was believed the closest for any known potentially hazardous asteroid (PHA) of this size before 2027, but in 2010 2005 YU55 was measured to be 400 meters in diameter.) At closest approach 2007 TU_{24} had an apparent magnitude of 10.3 and was about 50 times fainter than the naked eye can see. It required about a 3-inch (76 mm) telescope to be seen.

== Impact risk assessment ==
From the date of discovery of asteroid 2007 TU_{24} on 11 October 2007, a total of 316 observations of it had been made by 31 January 2008, spanning 112 days. Now the asteroid has an observation arc of about 9.6 years and the trajectory is well defined. It was removed from the Sentry Risk Table on 4 December 2007 at 14:05 UTC.

== 2008 passage ==
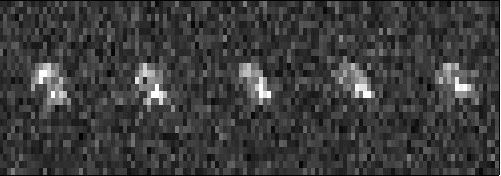
A series of low-resolution radar images of asteroid 2007 TU24

Goldstone Observatory carried out radar observations on January 23 and 24 January 2008. As of then, the orbit of the asteroid was known with such a high precision that scientists were able to calculate close approaches from the year 67 AD to 2141 AD. On 29 January 2008 at 08:33 UTC, 2007 TU_{24} passed by the earth at a nominal distance of 0.0037043 AU (554,160 km; 344,340 mi) with a relative speed of 9.248 km/s.

Observations from Arecibo Observatory were taken on 1–4 February. It is a contact binary asteroid.

Animation of two photos taken from Slooh Teide observatory on 31 January 2008

== Other close approaches ==
- Asteroid 2004 XP14 was the closest potentially hazardous asteroid, passing Earth by 432,308 km (268,624 mi), 0.00289 AU, or just 1.1 times the Moon's average distance from Earth on 3 July 2006.
- Asteroid 4179 Toutatis (4.5 km diameter) came within 1.5 million km, 0.0104 AU (within 4 lunar distances) of the Earth on 29 September 2004.
- On 7 August 2027, (137108) 1999 AN10 will pass within 388,960 km (0.0026 AU) of Earth
- On 13 April 2029, Apophis will pass the earth within the orbits of the geosynchronous communication satellites.

== See also ==
- List of exceptional asteroids
- Asteroid impact avoidance
- Asteroid naming conventions
- Radar astronomy
