= List of Apollo asteroid records =

The following is a list of current records for Apollo asteroids.

== Discovery records ==
- 1st Discovered: 1862 Apollo (1932)

== Size records ==
- Largest: 1866 Sisyphus
- Smallest: 2008 TC_{3} (destroyed in Earth's atmosphere), 2003 SQ_{222}

== Orbit element records ==
- Smallest Perihelion: 2004 FN_{8}
- Smallest Semi-Major Axis: 164207 Cardea
- Smallest Aphelion: 1991 VG
- Largest Perihelion: (399457) 2002 PD43
- Largest Semi-Major Axis: 1999 XS_{35}
- Largest Aphelion: 1999 XS_{35}
- Lowest Inclination: (152685) 1998 MZ
- Highest Inclination: (5496) 1973 NA
- Lowest Eccentricity: 1991 VG
- Highest Eccentricity: (399457) 2002 PD43
