= (292220) 2006 SU49 =

Sub-kilometer asteroid

(292220) 2006 SU_{49}
Discovery
- Discovered by: Spacewatch
- Discovery site: Kitt Peak National Obs.
- Discovery date: 20 September 2006

Designations
- Alternative designations: 2001 UV_{17}
- Minor planet category: Apollo; NEO; PHA

Orbital characteristics
- Epoch 4 September 2017 (JD 2458000.5)
- Uncertainty parameter 0
- Observation arc: 14.95 yr (5,462 days)
- Aphelion: 1.8533 AU
- Perihelion: 0.9718 AU
- Semi-major axis: 1.4125 AU
- Eccentricity: 0.3121
- Orbital period (sidereal): 1.68 yr (613 days)
- Mean anomaly: 67.239°
- Mean motion: 0° 35^{m} 13.56^{s} / day
- Inclination: 2.5187°
- Longitude of ascending node: 303.14°
- Argument of perihelion: 198.98°
- Earth MOID: 0.0008 AU (0.3 LD)

Physical characteristics
- Mean diameter: 0.377 km (estimate)
- Mass: 7.3×10^{10} kg (estimate)
- Absolute magnitude (H): 19.5

(292220) 2006 SU_{49} is a sub-kilometer asteroid, classified as a near-Earth object and potentially hazardous asteroid of the Apollo group that had a small chance of impacting Earth in 2029.

It was discovered on 20 September 2006, by the Spacewatch project at the University of Arizona using the dedicated 0.9-meter telescope at Kitt Peak National Observatory. The asteroid was calculated to measure 377 meters in diameter with a mass of 7.3×10^{10} kg.

== Description ==
2006 SU_{49} had a 1 in 42,000 chance of impacting Earth on 22 January 2029. By 29 October 2006, it was listed with a Torino Scale impact risk value of 0. It was removed from the Sentry Risk Table on 23 November 2006. It is now known that on 28 January 2029, the asteroid will be 0.00818 AU (1,224,000 km; 760,000 mi) from Earth.

It is a near-Earth asteroid that received minor attention in late September and early October 2006 because initial observations indicated a higher than usual probability that it would strike the Earth in 2029. However, the Near-Earth Object (NEO) Office at NASA's Jet Propulsion Laboratory (JPL) removed 2006 SU_{49} from its risk list as additional observations provided improved predictions that eliminated the possibility of an impact on Earth or the Moon through 2106. Similarly, NEODyS estimates show a zero impact probability through 2080.

2006 SU_{49} briefly led the Earth-impact hazard list from 27 September 2006 through 4 October 2006, temporarily displacing (144898) 2004 VD17 from the number one position. At the time, both held a Torino scale of level 1 and were the only asteroids to hold a Torino value greater than 0.

Even though 2006 SU_{49} has an Earth MOID of 0.0003 AU (45,000 km; 28,000 mi), the orbit and future close approaches are well determined with an orbital uncertainty of 0. It is also an Earth-crosser and Mars-crosser asteroid.

== See also ==
- List of exceptional asteroids
- Asteroid impact avoidance
