= (179806) 2002 TD66 =

Near-Earth asteroid

(179806) 2002 TD_{66}
Discovery
- Discovered by: LINEAR
- Discovery site: Lincoln Lab ETS
- Discovery date: 5 October 2002

Designations
- Minor planet category: NEO · Apollo

Orbital characteristics
- Epoch 13 January 2016 (JD 2457400.5)
- Uncertainty parameter 0
- Observation arc: 2017 days (5.52 yr)
- Aphelion: 2.8505 AU (426.43 Gm)
- Perihelion: 0.86543 AU (129.466 Gm)
- Semi-major axis: 1.8580 AU (277.95 Gm)
- Eccentricity: 0.53421
- Orbital period (sidereal): 2.53 yr (925.03 d)
- Mean anomaly: 55.037°
- Mean motion: 0° 23^{m} 21.048^{s} / day
- Inclination: 4.9211°
- Longitude of ascending node: 335.73°
- Argument of perihelion: 125.66°
- Earth MOID: 0.00603808 AU (903,284 km)
- Jupiter MOID: 2.35661 AU (352.544 Gm)

Physical characteristics
- Dimensions: 300 meters 270–590 meters ^{H}
- Synodic rotation period: 9.455 h (0.3940 d)
- Absolute magnitude (H): 20.2

(179806) 2002 TD_{66} is a sub-kilometer asteroid, classified as a near-Earth object of the Apollo group. It was discovered on 5 October 2002, by the LINEAR project at Lincoln Laboratory's ETS in Socorro, New Mexico. It was announced on 7 October 2002 and appeared later that day on the JPL current risk page.

== Description ==
Due to the proximity of its orbit to Earth and its estimated size, this object has been classified as a potentially hazardous asteroid (PHA) by the Minor Planet Center in Cambridge, Massachusetts. In November 2006 there were 823 PHAs known. As of October 2011, there are 1261 PHAs known. 2002 TD_{66} was removed from the Sentry Risk Table on October 10, 2002. A Doppler observation has helped produce a well known trajectory with a condition code (Uncertainty Parameter U) of 0.

Based on an absolute magnitude (H) of 20.2, the asteroid is estimated to be between 270 and 590 meters in diameter. Radar astronomy shows it is a contact binary asteroid with a diameter of 300 meters and a rotation period of 9.5 hours.

On February 26, 2008, 2002 TD_{66} passed 0.04282 AU (6,406,000 km; 3,980,000 mi) from Earth. The asteroid also comes close to Venus, Mars, and dwarf planet Ceres.
