= (52760) 1998 ML14 =

Asteroid

(52760) 1998 ML_{14}
- Radar Image of 1998 ML_{14}

Discovery
- Discovered by: LINEAR
- Discovery site: Lincoln Lab's ETS
- Discovery date: 24 June 1998

Designations
- Minor planet category: NEO · Apollo · PHA

Orbital characteristics
- Epoch 4 September 2017 (JD 2458000.5)
- Uncertainty parameter 0
- Observation arc: 15.54 yr (5,676 days)
- Aphelion: 3.9104 AU
- Perihelion: 0.9071 AU
- Semi-major axis: 2.4088 AU
- Eccentricity: 0.6234
- Orbital period (sidereal): 3.74 yr (1,366 days)
- Mean anomaly: 21.557°
- Mean motion: 0° 15^{m} 48.96^{s} / day
- Inclination: 2.4274°
- Longitude of ascending node: 338.72°
- Argument of perihelion: 20.324°
- Earth MOID: 0.0167 AU · 6.5 LD

Physical characteristics
- Dimensions: 1.0±0.05 km 0.81±0.16 km 1.17 km (derived)
- Synodic rotation period: 14.98±0.06 h 14.98±0.06 h 14.28±0.01 h
- Geometric albedo: 0.27±0.24; 0.20 (assumed)
- Spectral type: S (Tholen)
- Absolute magnitude (H): 16.93±0.01 · 17.02 · 17.5

(52760) 1998 ML_{14} is a stony asteroid, classified as a near-Earth object of the Apollo group and potentially hazardous asteroid, approximately 1 kilometer in diameter. It was discovered on 24 June 1998, by the LINEAR survey at the Lincoln Laboratory's Experimental Test Site in Socorro, New Mexico.

== Description ==
1998 ML_{14} orbits the Sun at a distance of 0.9–3.9 AU once every 3 years and 9 months (1,366 days). Its orbit has an eccentricity of 0.62 and an inclination of 2° with respect to the ecliptic. It is also a Mars-crossing asteroid.

Shortly after its discovery, 1998 ML_{14} was imaged by radar at Goldstone and Arecibo.

The study showed that the asteroid has a rotation period of 15 hours, and a shape that is roughly spherical, with some steep protrusions and large craters.

On 24 August 2013 it passed at a distance of 21.9 Lunar distances. It was hoped to be observed by Goldstone radar.

== Numbering and naming ==
This minor planet was numbered by the Minor Planet Center on 16 February 2003. As of 2018, it has not been named.
