= 2025 PU =

Apollo group asteroid

Discovery
- Discovery date: 3 August 2025 (Note: Discoverer not yet assigned by the MPC.)

Designations
- Designation: 2025 PU
- Minor planet category: NEO · Apollo

Orbital characteristics
- Epoch 21 November 2025 (JD 2461000.5)
- Uncertainty parameter 7
- Observation arc: 1 d
- Aphelion: 2.32971 AU
- Perihelion: 0.925407 AU
- Semi-major axis: 1.62755 AU
- Eccentricity: 0.431414
- Orbital period (sidereal): 2.07641 y (758.409 d)
- Mean anomaly: 69.4445°
- Mean motion: 0.474678° / d
- Inclination: 5.55373°
- Longitude of ascending node: 310.567°
- Argument of perihelion: 314.905°
- Earth MOID: 0.00014599 AU
- T_{Jupiter}: 4.201

Physical characteristics
- Mean diameter: 2.1–4.8 m

2025 PU is a near-Earth asteroid belonging to the Apollo group. It has an estimated diameter of 2.1–4.8 meters.

On 2 August 2025, 2025 PU made a close approach to Earth, passing within 53,000 kilometers of Earth with a speed of 10.5 kilometres per second (6.5 mi/s). This makes it the 83rd asteroid to fly within the orbit of the Moon in 2025, and the first asteroid to do so in the month of August. 10 hours after closest approach, on 3 August, it was first observed by the NASA/JPL SynTrack Robotic Telescope in Auberry, California, United States. It was given the provisional designation 2025 PU by the Minor Planet Center, and its detection was announced in a Minor Planet Electronic Circular on 4 August.

== See also ==
Other close flybys of 2025:

- 2025 TF – Closest approach at 409±14 km on 1 October
