= 2013 RH74 =

Near-Earth asteroid

2013 RH_{74}
Discovery
- Discovered by: Catalina Sky Survey
- Discovery date: September 2013

Designations
- Minor planet category: Apollo NEO

Orbital characteristics
- Epoch 13 January 2016 (JD 2457400.5)
- Uncertainty parameter 3
- Aphelion: 3.6416 AU (544.78 Gm)
- Perihelion: 0.92775 AU (138.789 Gm)
- Semi-major axis: 2.2847 AU (341.79 Gm)
- Eccentricity: 0.59392
- Orbital period (sidereal): 3.45 yr (1261.3 d)
- Mean anomaly: 224.40°
- Mean motion: 0° 17^{m} 7.476^{s} / day
- Inclination: 5.5202°
- Longitude of ascending node: 201.092°
- Argument of perihelion: 226.73°
- Earth MOID: 0.0178259 AU (2.66672 Gm)
- Jupiter MOID: 1.72362 AU (257.850 Gm)

Physical characteristics
- Synodic rotation period: 5.3 h (0.22 d), 5.346 h (0.2228 d)
- Absolute magnitude (H): 20.9

2013 RH_{74} is an Apollo asteroid and a near-Earth object discovered in September 2013 by the Catalina Sky Survey. The asteroid is roughly 300 meters in diameter. It was listed on the Sentry Risk Table in September 2013. It was detected by radar soon after discovery. On 17 October 2013, the asteroid passed 0.05258 AU (7,866,000 km; 4,888,000 mi) from Earth.

== See also ==
- List of Apollo asteroids
