= (444004) 2004 AS1 =

Near-Earth asteroid

(444004) 2004 AS_{1}
Discovery
- Discovered by: LINEAR
- Discovery site: Lincoln Lab's ETS
- Discovery date: 13 January 2004

Designations
- Alternative designations: AL00667
- Minor planet category: NEO · Apollo · PHA

Orbital characteristics
- Epoch 4 September 2017 (JD 2458000.5)
- Uncertainty parameter 0
- Observation arc: 11.68 yr (4,265 days)
- Aphelion: 1.2573 AU
- Perihelion: 0.8838 AU
- Semi-major axis: 1.0706 AU
- Eccentricity: 0.1744
- Orbital period (sidereal): 1.11 yr (405 days)
- Mean anomaly: 21.337°
- Mean motion: 0° 53^{m} 23.28^{s} / day
- Inclination: 17.215°
- Longitude of ascending node: 322.56°
- Argument of perihelion: 262.07°
- Earth MOID: 0.0240 AU (9.3 LD)

Physical characteristics
- Mean diameter: 240 m (est. at 0.20); 480 m (est. at 0.05)
- Absolute magnitude (H): 20.5

(444004) 2004 AS_{1} is a sub-kilometer asteroid, classified as a near-Earth object and potentially hazardous asteroid of the Apollo group, approximately 300 meters in diameter.

It was discovered on 13 January 2004, by astronomers of the LINEAR program at the Lincoln Laboratory's Experimental Test Site near Socorro, New Mexico, in the United States.

== Description ==
Based on the asteroids brightness and assumed proximity to Earth, the asteroid was originally estimated to be only 30 meters in diameter.

=== Orbit and classification ===
2004 AS_{1} orbits the Sun at a distance of 0.88–1.26 AU once every 13 months (405 days; semi-major axis of 1.07 AU). Its orbit has an eccentricity of 0.17 and an inclination of 17° with respect to the ecliptic. The body's observation arc begins with its official discovery observation at Socorro in January 2004.

=== Close approaches ===
Although rather ordinary, it caused some controversy in astronomical circles due to initial projections posted on the web by the Minor Planet Center (MPC) suggesting an imminent collision with Earth on or about January 15 with a likelihood of 1:4. These projections came from very early observations, and turned out to be inaccurate (which is an ordinary occurrence in astronomy, as new observations refine the projected path of an object). In fact, the poster at the MPC had not realised that the data he had posted was essentially an impact prediction.

The asteroid passed Earth on 16 February 2004 at a distance of 0.08539 AU (12,774,000 km; 7,937,000 mi)(or 33 times the distance from Earth to the Moon), posing no threat. It is an Apollo asteroid, with perihelion at 0.88 AU, a rather low eccentricity of 0.17, an inclination of 17° and an orbital period of 1.11 years.

=== Diameter and albedo ===
Based on a generic magnitude-to-diameter conversion, 2004 AS_{1} measures between 240 and 480 meters in diameter, for a measured absolute magnitude of 20.5, and an assumed albedo of 0.20 and 0.05, which corresponds to a body with a stony and carbonaceous composition, respectively.
