= 2019 SU3 =

Near-Earth asteroid

Discovery
- Discovered by: ATLAS-HKO
- Discovery site: Haleakala Obs.
- Discovery date: 23 September 2019 (first observed only)

Designations
- Minor planet category: NEO · Apollo

Orbital characteristics
- Epoch 27 April 2019 (JD 2458600.5)
- Uncertainty parameter 2 · 3
- Observation arc: 28 days
- Aphelion: 1.1948 AU
- Perihelion: 0.9922 AU
- Semi-major axis: 1.0935 AU
- Eccentricity: 0.0927
- Orbital period (sidereal): 1.14 yr (418 d)
- Mean anomaly: 257.62°
- Mean motion: 0° 51^{m} 42.84^{s} / day
- Inclination: 1.1621°
- Longitude of ascending node: 5.1182°
- Argument of perihelion: 322.69°
- Earth MOID: 0.0022 AU (0.86 LD)

Physical characteristics
- Mean diameter: 15 m
- Absolute magnitude (H): 27.2; 27.28

2019 SU_{3} is a very small near-Earth asteroid of the Apollo group, first observed by the Asteroid Terrestrial-impact Last Alert System at Haleakala Observatory on 23 September 2019. It was briefly listed on the Risk List of the European Space Agency. With a 18-day observation arc, the nominal orbit passes 0.02 AU (3,000,000 km; 1,900,000 mi) from Earth on 27 September 2084. It was removed from the Sentry Risk Table on 12 October 2019.

Based on calculations with a shorter observation arc, the asteroid could have passed very close to Earth, about 9,700 km (6,000 mi), in mid-September, 2084. According to astronomers, "Its small size of about 15 m (49 ft) would result in limited consequences even in case of impact."

== Trajectory ==
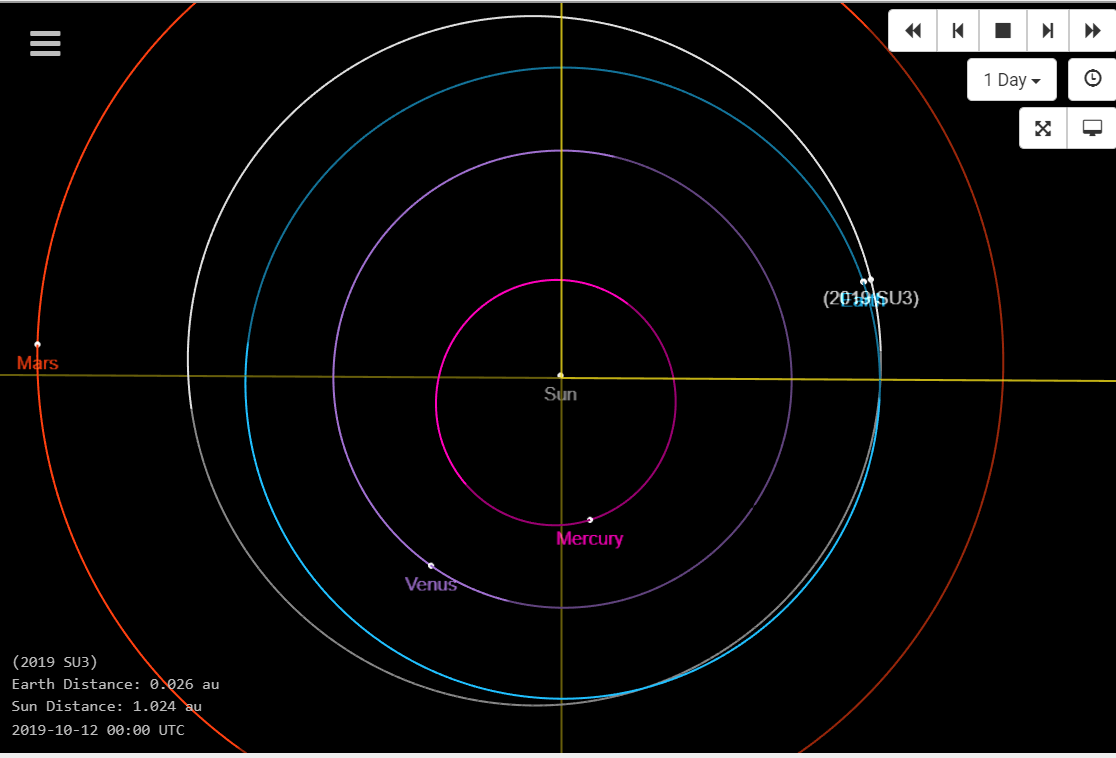
2019 SU3 asteroid trajectory – as/of 12 October 2019 (Asteroid orbit is in white; Earth orbit is in blue)

== See also ==
- Chelyabinsk meteor
