= 1999 AO10 =

Sub-kilometer sized asteroid

1999 AO_{10}
Discovery
- Discovered by: LINEAR
- Discovery site: Lincoln Laboratory's ETS
- Discovery date: 13 January 1999 (first observation only)

Designations
- Minor planet category: NEO · Aten

Orbital characteristics
- Epoch 21 November 2025 (JD 2461000.5)
- Uncertainty parameter 0
- Observation arc: 9927 days
- Aphelion: 1.0133 AU
- Perihelion: 0.8109477 AU
- Semi-major axis: 0.9121214 AU
- Eccentricity: 0.1109213
- Orbital period (sidereal): 0.87 yr (318 days)
- Mean anomaly: 88.563°
- Mean motion: 1° 7^{m} 53.04^{s} / day
- Inclination: 2.62399°
- Longitude of ascending node: 313.05°
- Argument of perihelion: 7.9568°
- Earth MOID: 0.0213 AU · 8.3 LD

Physical characteristics
- Dimensions: 0.05 km (est. at 0.20
- Absolute magnitude (H): 24.27

1999 AO_{10} is a sub-kilometer sized asteroid, classified as near-Earth object of the Aten group, approximately 50 meters in diameter. It was first observed on 13 January 1999, by the LINEAR project at Lincoln Laboratory's ETS near Socorro, New Mexico, United States. The asteroid has been the target of a proposed mission.

== Orbit ==
1999 AO_{10} orbits the Sun at a distance of 0.8–1.0 AU once every 10 months (318 days). Its orbit has an eccentricity of 0.11 and an inclination of 3° with respect to the ecliptic. The initial orbital elements were determined based on 16 observations made between January 13–15, 1999. The asteroid was recovered on 14 Jan 2026 by Steward Observatory and Mt. Lemmon Station. It has been observed since then till 19 March by many observatories in the Americas, Africa, Europe, and Asia. The orbital elements are now well established with an uncertainty code of 0.

The asteroid has an Earth minimum orbital intersection distance of 0.0213 AU (3,190,000 km), which translates into 8.3 lunar distances.

== Crewed mission ==
NASA has proposed a crewed mission to the object during 2025 or later. 1999 AO_{10} is one of a handful of objects within the acceptable range for the mission and is also one of the largest objects that meets the qualifications. In this proposal, a pair of docked Orion spacecraft would spend 14 days at the object, for a total mission time of 155 days. The astronauts would return samples and help test spacefaring capabilities for a future Mars mission. The crewed mission would be preceded by an unmanned probe to be sent in 2019 at the earliest.
