= (612901) 2004 XP14 =

Near-Earth asteroid

(612901) 2004 XP_{14}
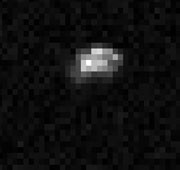
- 2004 XP_{14} imaged by the Goldstone Solar System Radar in 2006

Discovery
- Discovered by: LINEAR
- Discovery date: 10 December 2004

Designations
- Minor planet category: NEO · Apollo · PHA

Orbital characteristics
- Epoch 13 January 2016 (JD 2457400.5)
- Uncertainty parameter 0
- Observation arc: 1007 days (2.76 yr)
- Aphelion: 1.21822 AU (182.243 Gm)
- Perihelion: 0.884900 AU (132.3792 Gm)
- Semi-major axis: 1.05156 AU (157.311 Gm)
- Eccentricity: 0.158488
- Orbital period (sidereal): 1.08 yr (393.87 d)
- Mean anomaly: 10.1555°
- Mean motion: 0° 54^{m} 50.45^{s} /day
- Inclination: 32.9505°
- Longitude of ascending node: 281.045°
- Argument of perihelion: 273.695°
- Earth MOID: 0.00316799 AU (473,925 km)

Physical characteristics
- Mean diameter: 130–260 m 300–800 m
- Synodic rotation period: 100 h (4.2 d)
- Absolute magnitude (H): 19.4

(612901) 2004 XP_{14} is a sub-kilometer asteroid, classified as a near-Earth object and potentially hazardous asteroid of the Apollo group. It was first observed by the LINEAR project on 10 December 2004.

== Description ==
2004 XP_{14} as seen from France during its closest approach to Earth on 3 July 2006

Although initially there were concerns that it might possibly impact Earth later in the 21st century and thus merit special monitoring, further analysis of its orbit has since ruled out any such collision, at least in the foreseeable future.

The size of 2004 XP_{14} is not precisely known. Based on optical measurements, the object is between 300 and 800 meters in diameter. Radar observations place a lower bound of about 260 meters (850 ft).

2004 XP_{14}'s closest pass by Earth was above the west coast of North America at 04:25 UTC on 3 July 2006.

The asteroid's distance from Earth's center of mass at that moment was 0.0028906 AU (432,430 km; 268,700 mi), or just 1.1 times the Moon's average distance from Earth. It was observed immediately after this close approach by radar from three locations, from Goldstone in the Mojave Desert in the US, from Sicily, and from Yevpatoria RT-70 radio telescope, Ukraine, as well as optically from other observatories and amateurs.

It was removed from the Sentry Risk Table on 17 March 2005.

H < 20 asteroids passing less than 2 LD from Earth
Asteroid	Date	Nominal approach distance (LD)	Min. distance (LD)	Max. distance (LD)	Absolute magnitude (H)	Size (meters)
(152680) 1998 KJ9	1914-12-31	0.606	0.604	0.608	19.4	279–900
(458732) 2011 MD5	1918-09-17	0.911	0.909	0.913	17.9	556–1795
(163132) 2002 CU11	1925-08-30	0.903	0.901	0.905	18.5	443–477
69230 Hermes	1937-10-30	1.926	1.926	1.927	17.5	668–2158
69230 Hermes	1942-04-26	1.651	1.651	1.651	17.5	668–2158
(27002) 1998 DV9	1975-01-31	1.762	1.761	1.762	18.1	507–1637
2002 NY40	2002-08-18	1.371	1.371	1.371	19.0	335–1082
2004 XP_{14}	2006-07-03	1.125	1.125	1.125	19.3	292–942
2015 TB145	2015-10-31	1.266	1.266	1.266	20.0	211–682
(137108) 1999 AN10	2027-08-07	1.014	1.010	1.019	17.9	556–1793
(153814) 2001 WN5	2028-06-26	0.647	0.647	0.647	18.2	921–943
99942 Apophis	2029-04-13	0.0981	0.0963	0.1000	19.7	310–340
2017 MB1	2072-07-26	1.216	1.215	2.759	18.8	367–1186
2011 SM68	2072-10-17	1.875	1.865	1.886	19.6	254–820
(163132) 2002 CU_{11}	2080-08-31	1.655	1.654	1.656	18.5	443–477
(416801) 1998 MZ	2116-11-26	1.068	1.068	1.069	19.2	305–986
(153201) 2000 WO107	2140-12-01	0.634	0.631	0.637	19.3	427–593
(276033) 2002 AJ129	2172-02-08	1.783	1.775	1.792	18.7	385–1242
(290772) 2005 VC	2198-05-05	1.951	1.791	2.134	17.6	638–2061
