= 1999 XS35 =

Near-Earth asteroid

1999 XS_{35}
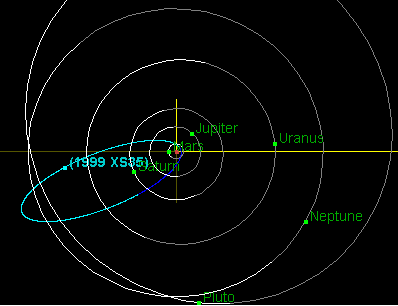
- The comet-like orbit of 1999 XS_{35}

Discovery
- Discovered by: LONEOS
- Discovery date: 2 December 1999

Designations
- Minor planet category: PHA; Apollo

Orbital characteristics
- Epoch 21 November 2025 (JD 2461000.5)
- Uncertainty parameter 5
- Aphelion: 34.690 AU (5.1896 Tm) (beyond Neptune)
- Perihelion: 0.93889 AU (140.456 Gm)
- Semi-major axis: 17.815 AU (2.6651 Tm)
- Eccentricity: 0.94730
- Orbital period (sidereal): 75.19 yr (27464 d)
- Mean anomaly: 124.72°
- Mean motion: 0° 0^{m} 47.189^{s} /day (n)
- Inclination: 19.608°
- Longitude of ascending node: 48.816°
- Argument of perihelion: 333.27°
- Earth MOID: 0.00018624 AU (0.027861 Gm)
- T_{Jupiter}: 1.409

Physical characteristics
- Mean diameter: 1.3 km (est. at 0.14)
- Apparent magnitude: 13.7 to 32
- Absolute magnitude (H): 17.69

1999 XS_{35} is a near-Earth object discovered in 1999 having a comet-like orbit. Its semi-major axis is 17.8 AU. Its orbital eccentricity is 0.94, which means that at the perihelion 1999 XS_{35} comes as close as 0.9 AU to the Sun, while at the aphelion it reaches beyond the orbit of Neptune. 1999 XS_{35} is a damocloid. 1999 XS_{35} is a small object with an absolute magnitude (H) of 17.2, which implies a size of about 1 km.

1999 XS_{35} came to perihelion on 21 October 1999, passed 0.0453 AU (6,780,000 km; 4,210,000 mi) from Earth on 5 November 1999, and was discovered on 2 December 1999 at about apparent magnitude 16.9.
