= List of unnumbered trans-Neptunian objects: 1999 =

The following is a partial list of unnumbered trans-Neptunian objects for principal designations assigned within 1999. As of October 2026, it contains a total of 93 bodies. For more information see the description on the main page. Also see list for the previous and next year.

== 1999 ==
Designation	First Observed (discovered)		D (km)	Orbital description						Remarks	Refs
Designation	Date	Observer (Site)	D (km)	Class	a (AU)	e	i (°)	q (AU)	Q (AU)	Remarks	Refs
1999 CA_{119}	10 February 1999	Maunakea (568)	98	cubewano (cold)?	45.2	0.00	0	45.2	45.2	albedo: 0.152	MPC · JPL
1999 CA_{132}	11 February 1999	Maunakea (568)	157	cubewano (hot)?	44.0	0.10	12	39.7	48.3	albedo: 0.079	MPC · JPL
1999 CB_{119}	10 February 1999	Maunakea (568)	177	cubewano (hot)	46.9	0.13	9	40.8	53.1	albedo: 0.079; BRmag: 1.93; taxonomy: RR	MPC · JPL
1999 CC_{119}	10 February 1999	Maunakea (568)	125	cubewano (cold)	44.8	0.07	1	41.5	48.0	albedo: 0.152	MPC · JPL
1999 CD_{119}	10 February 1999	Maunakea (568)	118	cubewano (cold)?	44.0	0.03	2	42.8	45.2	albedo: 0.152	MPC · JPL
1999 CG_{154}	11 February 1999	Maunakea (568)	113	cubewano (cold)	43.2	0.09	1	39.4	47.1	albedo: 0.152	MPC · JPL
1999 CH_{119}	11 February 1999	Maunakea (568)	170	cubewano (hot)	43.5	0.08	20	40.1	46.9	albedo: 0.079	MPC · JPL
1999 CH_{154}	12 February 1999	Maunakea (568)	100	cubewano (cold)	43.2	0.01	1	42.6	43.7	albedo: 0.152	MPC · JPL
1999 CJ_{119}	11 February 1999	Maunakea (568)	112	cubewano (cold)	45.5	0.07	3	42.3	48.8	albedo: 0.152; BRmag: 2.07	MPC · JPL
1999 CK_{119}	11 February 1999	Maunakea (568)	124	cubewano (hot)?	42.1	0.00	12	42.1	42.1	albedo: 0.079	MPC · JPL
1999 CK_{158}	10 February 1999	Maunakea (568)	108	cubewano (hot)?	41.0	0.08	17	37.9	44.0	albedo: 0.079	MPC · JPL
1999 CM_{119}	11 February 1999	Maunakea (568)	90	cubewano (cold)	44.3	0.12	3	39.2	49.5	albedo: 0.152; BRmag: 1.78	MPC · JPL
1999 CM_{153}	11 February 1999	Maunakea (568)	114	cubewano (cold)	45.8	0.14	0	39.3	52.3	albedo: 0.152	MPC · JPL
1999 CN_{119}	11 February 1999	Maunakea (568)	82	cubewano (cold)	43.9	0.04	1	42.2	45.6	albedo: 0.152	MPC · JPL
1999 CN_{153}	11 February 1999	Maunakea (568)	121	cubewano (hot)	44.0	0.12	7	38.9	49.0	albedo: 0.079	MPC · JPL
1999 CP_{153}	10 February 1999	Maunakea (568)	98	cubewano (cold)?	44.4	0.07	3	41.2	47.5	albedo: 0.152	MPC · JPL
1999 CQ_{133}	12 February 1999	Maunakea (568)	196	cubewano (hot)	41.5	0.09	13	37.6	45.3	albedo: 0.079; BRmag: 1.35	MPC · JPL
1999 CQ_{153}	11 February 1999	Maunakea (568)	75	cubewano (cold)	46.4	0.06	0	43.5	49.4	albedo: 0.152	MPC · JPL
1999 CR_{133}	12 February 1999	Maunakea (568)	82	cubewano (cold)?	42.3	0.00	2	42.3	42.3	albedo: 0.152	MPC · JPL
1999 CR_{153}	11 February 1999	Maunakea (568)	78	cubewano (cold)?	44.3	0.08	1	40.7	47.9	albedo: 0.152	MPC · JPL
1999 CS_{153}	11 February 1999	Maunakea (568)	82	cubewano (cold)?	44.0	0.03	1	42.9	45.1	albedo: 0.152	MPC · JPL
1999 CT_{153}	11 February 1999	Maunakea (568)	74	cubewano (cold)?	44.9	0.10	5	40.4	49.5	albedo: 0.152	MPC · JPL
1999 CW_{118}	10 February 1999	Maunakea (568)	94	cubewano (cold)?	43.5	0.00	1	43.5	43.5	albedo: 0.152	MPC · JPL
1999 CW_{131}	10 February 1999	Maunakea (568)	124	cubewano (hot)?	43.6	0.09	8	39.7	47.4	albedo: 0.079	MPC · JPL
1999 CX_{118}	10 February 1999	Maunakea (568)	130	cubewano (cold)?	43.6	0.03	2	42.4	44.8	albedo: 0.152	MPC · JPL
1999 CY_{118}	10 February 1999	Maunakea (568)	70	SDO	90.3	0.62	26	34.6	146.1	albedo: 0.124	MPC · JPL
1999 CY_{131}	11 February 1999	Maunakea (568)	113	cubewano (hot)?	43.9	0.14	25	38.0	49.9	albedo: 0.079	MPC · JPL
1999 CZ_{118}	10 February 1999	Maunakea (568)	99	SDO	116.7	0.68	28	37.5	195.9	albedo: 0.124	MPC · JPL
1999 CZ_{131}	11 February 1999	Maunakea (568)	90	cubewano (cold)?	43.4	0.04	2	41.5	45.2	albedo: 0.152	MPC · JPL
1999 DA	16 February 1999	Maunakea (568)	97	cubewano (cold)	43.4	0.07	3	40.4	46.3	albedo: 0.152	MPC · JPL
1999 DB_{8}	16 February 1999	Maunakea (568)	46	cubewano (hot)?	50.7	0.26	20	37.4	63.9	albedo: 0.079	MPC · JPL
1999 DC_{8}	16 February 1999	Maunakea (568)	48	cubewano (hot)?	43.4	0.10	5	39.3	47.6	albedo: 0.079	MPC · JPL
1999 DD_{8}	16 February 1999	Maunakea (568)	23	other TNO	38.3	0.11	6	34.1	42.4	albedo: 0.13	MPC · JPL
1999 DE_{8}	16 February 1999	Maunakea (568)	40	cubewano (cold)?	50.7	0.11	3	45.1	56.3	albedo: 0.152	MPC · JPL
1999 DF_{8}	16 February 1999	Maunakea (568)	37	cubewano (cold)?	41.0	0.09	3	37.2	44.8	albedo: 0.152	MPC · JPL
1999 DG_{8}	16 February 1999	Maunakea (568)	86	SDO	61.6	0.10	35	55.2	68.0	albedo: 0.124	MPC · JPL
1999 DH_{8}	16 February 1999	Maunakea (568)	62	cubewano (cold)	44.2	0.08	5	40.9	47.5	albedo: 0.152	MPC · JPL
1999 DL_{8}	16 February 1999	Maunakea (568)	109	cubewano (hot)?	74.7	0.22	175	58.1	91.3	albedo: 0.079	MPC · JPL
1999 DM_{8}	16 February 1999	Maunakea (568)	39	cubewano (cold)?	45.7	0.11	4	40.8	50.6	albedo: 0.152	MPC · JPL
1999 DN_{8}	16 February 1999	Maunakea (568)	39	cubewano (cold)?	40.9	0.09	3	37.1	44.8	albedo: 0.152	MPC · JPL
1999 DO_{8}	16 February 1999	Maunakea (568)	34	cubewano (cold)?	42.6	0.11	4	37.8	47.4	albedo: 0.152	MPC · JPL
1999 DP_{8}	16 February 1999	Maunakea (568)	71	SDO	59.1	0.11	39	52.7	65.4	albedo: 0.124	MPC · JPL
1999 DQ_{8}	16 February 1999	Maunakea (568)	72	cubewano (hot)?	41.9	0.09	15	38.0	45.8	albedo: 0.079	MPC · JPL
1999 DR_{8}	16 February 1999	Maunakea (568)	66	cubewano (hot)?	47.9	0.09	8	43.4	52.4	albedo: 0.079	MPC · JPL
1999 DZ_{7}	16 February 1999	Maunakea (568)	85	plutino?	39.4	0.27	14	28.9	49.9	albedo: 0.074	MPC · JPL
1999 GS_{46}	12 April 1999	European Southern Observatory, La Silla (809)	197	cubewano (hot)	44.5	0.09	5	40.6	48.4	albedo: 0.079; BRmag: 1.76	MPC · JPL
1999 HA_{12}	17 April 1999	Kitt Peak (695)	94	cubewano (cold)?	43.1	0.06	4	40.6	45.7	albedo: 0.152	MPC · JPL
1999 HG_{12}	18 April 1999	Kitt Peak (695)	136	res · 4:7	43.5	0.15	1	36.8	50.1	albedo: 0.126; BRmag: 1.61; taxonomy: IR-RR	MPC · JPL
1999 HH_{12}	18 April 1999	Kitt Peak (695)	137	cubewano (cold)	43.4	0.02	1	42.6	44.3	albedo: 0.152	MPC · JPL
1999 HJ_{12}	18 April 1999	Kitt Peak (695)	113	cubewano (cold)	42.9	0.05	5	40.9	45.0	albedo: 0.152	MPC · JPL
1999 HS_{11}	17 April 1999	Kitt Peak (695)	142	cubewano (cold)	44.0	0.02	3	43.3	44.7	albedo: 0.152; BRmag: 1.86; taxonomy: RR	MPC · JPL
1999 HY_{11}	17 April 1999	Kitt Peak (695)	103	cubewano (hot)?	42.2	0.06	6	39.6	44.7	albedo: 0.079	MPC · JPL
1999 HZ_{11}	17 April 1999	Kitt Peak (695)	99	cubewano (hot)?	42.4	0.08	10	39.0	45.7	albedo: 0.079	MPC · JPL
1999 JA_{132}	10 May 1999	Cerro Tololo Observatory, La Serena (807)	136	cubewano (hot)?	44.6	0.00	7	44.5	44.6	albedo: 0.079	MPC · JPL
1999 JB_{132}	10 May 1999	Cerro Tololo Observatory, La Serena (807)	110	other TNO	38.3	0.10	13	34.5	42.0	albedo: 0.13	MPC · JPL
1999 JC_{132}	10 May 1999	Cerro Tololo Observatory, La Serena (807)	65	other TNO	41.5	0.11	5	37.1	45.9	albedo: 0.13	MPC · JPL
1999 JD_{132}	10 May 1999	Cerro Tololo Observatory, La Serena (807)	136	cubewano (hot)	43.1	0.07	11	40.2	46.1	albedo: 0.079; BRmag: 1.59	MPC · JPL
1999 JE_{132}	10 May 1999	Cerro Tololo Observatory, La Serena (807)	68	other TNO	40.8	0.10	24	36.7	44.8	albedo: 0.13	MPC · JPL
1999 JF_{132}	10 May 1999	Cerro Tololo Observatory, La Serena (807)	90	cubewano (cold)?	42.6	0.10	2	38.2	47.0	albedo: 0.152	MPC · JPL
1999 JH_{132}	10 May 1999	Cerro Tololo Observatory, La Serena (807)	52	cubewano (cold)?	45.5	0.11	1	40.7	50.3	albedo: 0.152	MPC · JPL
1999 JJ_{132}	10 May 1999	Cerro Tololo Observatory, La Serena (807)	57	cubewano (cold)?	55.2	0.11	3	49.4	61.0	albedo: 0.152	MPC · JPL
1999 JK_{132}	10 May 1999	Cerro Tololo Observatory, La Serena (807)	68	other TNO	35.8	0.10	17	32.3	39.3	albedo: 0.13	MPC · JPL
1999 KK_{17}	18 May 1999	Cerro Tololo Observatory, La Serena (807)	77	cubewano (cold)?	48.0	0.10	4	43.1	52.8	albedo: 0.152	MPC · JPL
1999 KL_{17}	18 May 1999	Cerro Tololo Observatory, La Serena (807)	62	cubewano (cold)?	46.2	0.03	3	44.9	47.6	albedo: 0.152	MPC · JPL
1999 KR_{18}	18 May 1999	Cerro Tololo Observatory, La Serena (807)	98	res · 4:7	43.5	0.21	1	34.3	52.7	albedo: 0.126	MPC · JPL
1999 KT_{16}	18 May 1999	Cerro Tololo Observatory, La Serena (807)	75	cubewano (hot)?	97.4	0.55	6	43.8	151.0	albedo: 0.079	MPC · JPL
1999 LB_{37}	8 June 1999	Palomar Mountain (675)	59	plutino?	39.5	0.19	15	31.9	47.1	albedo: 0.074	MPC · JPL
1999 OA_{4}	21 July 1999	Maunakea (568)	90	cubewano (cold)	44.3	0.07	3	41.3	47.3	albedo: 0.152	MPC · JPL
1999 OC_{4}	18 July 1999	Maunakea (568)	75	cubewano (cold)	45.4	0.17	1	37.8	53.0	albedo: 0.152	MPC · JPL
1999 OD_{4}	19 July 1999	Maunakea (568)	171	cubewano (hot)	41.4	0.10	14	37.4	45.4	albedo: 0.079	MPC · JPL
1999 OG_{4}	20 July 1999	Maunakea (568)	98	cubewano (cold)	46.9	0.13	1	40.7	53.2	albedo: 0.152	MPC · JPL
1999 OH_{4}	18 July 1999	Maunakea (568)	103	cubewano (hot)?	40.4	0.04	28	38.9	41.9	albedo: 0.079; BRmag: 3.20	MPC · JPL
1999 OK_{4}	19 July 1999	Maunakea (568)	145	cubewano (hot)?	43.1	0.16	30	36.3	50.0	albedo: 0.079	MPC · JPL
1999 OZ_{3}	21 July 1999	Maunakea (568)	121	cubewano (cold)	43.9	0.08	3	40.3	47.5	albedo: 0.152	MPC · JPL
1999 RB_{215}	6 September 1999	Maunakea (568)	49	twotino	47.9	0.34	8	31.5	64.3	albedo: 0.126	MPC · JPL
1999 RC_{216}	8 September 1999	Maunakea (568)	118	cubewano (cold)?	44.4	0.08	1	40.8	48.0	albedo: 0.152	MPC · JPL
1999 RF_{215}	7 September 1999	Maunakea (568)	113	cubewano (cold)?	44.0	0.00	4	44.0	44.0	albedo: 0.152	MPC · JPL
1999 RG_{215}	7 September 1999	Maunakea (568)	118	cubewano (cold)	46.5	0.07	0	43.1	49.9	albedo: 0.152	MPC · JPL
1999 RK_{257}	12 September 1999	Maunakea (568)	103	cubewano (hot)?	43.2	0.05	18	41.0	45.4	albedo: 0.079	MPC · JPL
1999 RR_{215}	7 September 1999	Maunakea (568)	82	cubewano (cold)	44.3	0.10	1	39.9	48.6	albedo: 0.152	MPC · JPL
1999 RS_{214}	6 September 1999	Maunakea (568)	90	cubewano (cold)?	43.0	0.00	3	43.0	43.0	albedo: 0.152	MPC · JPL
1999 RT_{214}	6 September 1999	Maunakea (568)	65	cubewano (cold)	42.5	0.05	3	40.6	44.5	binary: 45 km, possible triple; albedo: 0.21	MPC · JPL
1999 RT_{215}	7 September 1999	Maunakea (568)	180	cubewano (hot)?	43.1	0.00	22	43.1	43.1	albedo: 0.079	MPC · JPL
1999 RU_{214}	6 September 1999	Maunakea (568)	151	res · 2:5	55.5	0.34	4	36.7	74.3	albedo: 0.126	MPC · JPL
1999 RV_{214}	6 September 1999	Maunakea (568)	90	cubewano (cold)	46.6	0.04	1	44.7	48.5	albedo: 0.152	MPC · JPL
1999 RV_{215}	7 September 1999	Maunakea (568)	99	cubewano (hot)?	44.9	0.19	22	36.5	53.2	albedo: 0.079	MPC · JPL
1999 RW_{214}	6 September 1999	Maunakea (568)	118	cubewano (cold)	43.0	0.03	1	41.8	44.3	albedo: 0.152	MPC · JPL
1999 RW_{215}	7 September 1999	Maunakea (568)	96	res · 3:4	36.6	0.16	11	30.6	42.5	albedo: 0.126	MPC · JPL
1999 RX_{214}	6 September 1999	Maunakea (568)	150	cubewano (cold)	46.2	0.17	5	38.4	54.0	albedo: 0.152; BRmag: 1.65; taxonomy: IR	MPC · JPL
1999 RX_{215}	8 September 1999	Maunakea (568)	111	cubewano (cold)	46.9	0.14	1	40.4	53.4	albedo: 0.152	MPC · JPL
1999 RZ_{214}	6 September 1999	Maunakea (568)	104	SDO	85.2	0.57	21	36.8	133.5	albedo: 0.124	MPC · JPL
1999 SA_{28}	16 September 1999	Maunakea (568)	169	plutino?	39.2	0.19	11	32.0	46.5	albedo: 0.074	MPC · JPL
1999 TR_{11}	9 October 1999	Maunakea (568)	101	plutino	39.7	0.25	17	29.8	49.6	albedo: 0.074; BRmag: 1.77; taxonomy: RR	MPC · JPL

back to top
