= Apollo asteroid =

Group of near-Earth asteroids

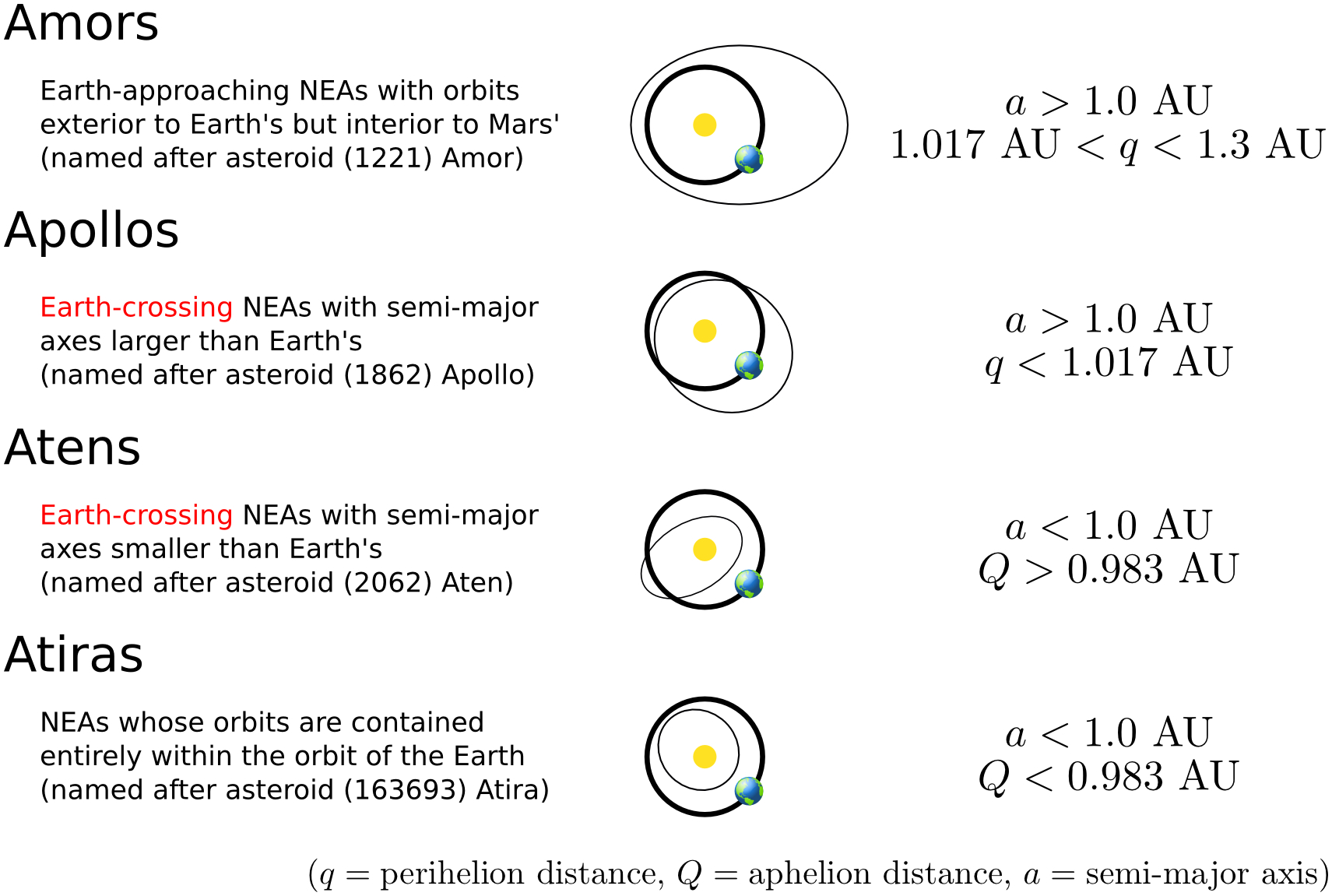
Common orbital subgroups of Near-Earth Objects (NEOs)

The Apollo asteroids are a group of near-Earth asteroids named after 1862 Apollo, discovered by German astronomer Karl Reinmuth in the 1930s. They are Earth-crossing asteroids that have an orbital semi-major axis greater than that of the Earth (a > 1 AU) but perihelion distances less than the Earth's aphelion distance (q < 1.017 AU).

As of January 2025, the number of known Apollo asteroids is 21,083, making the class the largest group of near-Earth objects (cf. the Aten, Amor and Atira asteroids), of which 1,742 are numbered (asteroids are not numbered until they have been observed at two or more oppositions), 81 are named, and 2,130 are identified as potentially hazardous asteroids.

The closer their semi-major axis is to Earth's, the less eccentricity is needed for the orbits to cross. The Chelyabinsk meteor, that exploded over the city of Chelyabinsk in the southern Urals region of Russia on February 15, 2013, injuring an estimated 1,500 people with flying glass from broken windows, was an Apollo-class asteroid.

Apollo asteroids are generally named after Greek deities.

== List ==
The largest known Apollo asteroid is 1866 Sisyphus, with a diameter of about 8.5 km. Examples of known Apollo asteroids include:

Designation	Year	Discoverer/First observed (Note: A discoverer is determined by the MPC when the object is numbered. For unnumbered bodies, the table gives the "first observer". LINEAR: Lincoln Near-Earth Asteroid Research CSS : Catalina Sky Survey Spacewatch, on Kitt Peak, near Tucson, Arizona)	Ref
2025 PU	2025	Zwicky Transient Facility	MPC
2024 PT5	2024	ATLAS-SAAO	MPC
2019 SU3	2019	ATLAS-HKO	MPC
2016 WF9	2016	NEOWISE	MPC
(671294) 2014 JO25	2014	CSS	MPC
(837253) 2013 FW13	2013	CSS	MPC
2013 RH74	2013	CSS	MPC
2011 MD	2011	LINEAR	MPC (Note: 2011 MD is classified as Amor, not Apollo asteroid by the MPC.)
2011 EO40	2011	CSS–Mount Lemmon Survey	MPC
2010 AL30	2010	LINEAR	MPC
(529366) 2009 WM1	2009	CSS	MPC
2009 DD45	2009	Siding Spring Observatory, Australia	MPC
(386454) 2008 XM	2008	LINEAR	List
2008 TC3	2008	CSS	MPC
2008 FF5	2008	CSS–Mount Lemmon Survey	MPC
2007 VK184	2007	CSS	MPC
2007 TU24	2007	CSS	MPC
2007 WD5	2007	CSS	MPC
2007 OX	2007	CSS–Mount Lemmon Survey	MPC
(277810) 2006 FV35	2006	Spacewatch	List
(394130) 2006 HY51	2006	LINEAR	List
(292220) 2006 SU49	2006	Spacewatch	List
(308635) 2005 YU55	2005	R. S. McMillan, Steward Observatory, Kitt Peak, USA	List
2005 WY55	2005	Mount Lemmon Survey	MPC
2005 HC4	2005	LONEOS	MPC
(612901) 2004 XP14	2004	LINEAR	MPC
(374158) 2004 UL	2004	LINEAR	List
(357439) 2004 BL86	2004	LINEAR	List
(444004) 2004 AS1	2004	LINEAR	List
2003 RW11	2003	James Whitney Young	MPC
2003 BV35	2003	James Whitney Young	MPC
(89958) 2002 LY45	2002	LINEAR	List
(179806) 2002 TD66	2002	LINEAR	List
54509 YORP	2000	LINEAR	List
162173 Ryugu	1999	LINEAR	List
(137108) 1999 AN10	1999	LINEAR	List
101955 Bennu	1999	LINEAR (Bennu is the target of the OSIRIS-REx mission)	List
1998 KY26	1998	Spacewatch	MPC
(433953) 1997 XR2	1997	LINEAR	List
65803 Didymos	1996	Spacewatch	List
69230 Hermes	1937	Karl Reinmuth	List
(53319) 1999 JM8	1999	LINEAR	List
(52760) 1998 ML14	1998	LINEAR	List
(35396) 1997 XF11	1997	Spacewatch	List
25143 Itokawa	1998	LINEAR	List
(136617) 1994 CC	1994	Spacewatch	List
(175706) 1996 FG3	1996	R. H. McNaught, Siding Spring Observatory, Australia	List
6489 Golevka	1991	Eleanor F. Helin	List
4769 Castalia	1989	Eleanor F. Helin	List
4660 Nereus	1982	Eleanor F. Helin	List
4581 Asclepius	1989	Henry E. Holt, Norman G. Thomas	List
4486 Mithra	1987	Eric Elst, Vladimir Shkodrov	List
14827 Hypnos	1986	Carolyn S. Shoemaker, Eugene Merle Shoemaker	List
4197 Morpheus	1982	Eleanor F. Helin, Eugene Merle Shoemaker	List
4183 Cuno	1959	Cuno Hoffmeister	List
4179 Toutatis	1989	Christian Pollas	List
4015 Wilson–Harrington	1979	Eleanor F. Helin	List
3200 Phaethon	1983	Simon F. Green, John K.Davies / IRAS	List
2063 Bacchus	1977	Charles T. Kowal	List
1866 Sisyphus	1972	Paul Wild	List
1620 Geographos	1951	Albert George Wilson, Rudolph Minkowski	List
(29075) 1950 DA	1950	Carl A. Wirtanen	List
1566 Icarus	1949	Walter Baade	List
1685 Toro	1948	Carl A. Wirtanen	List
2101 Adonis	1936	Eugène Joseph Delporte	List
1862 Apollo	1932	Karl Reinmuth	List

== See also ==
- Alinda group
- Amor asteroid
- Apollo asteroids (category)
- Apollo asteroid records
- Aten asteroid
- List of minor planets
- 2020 PP1
