= List of minor planets: 292001–293000 =

The following is a partial list of minor planets, running from minor-planet number 292001 through 293000, inclusive. The primary data for this and other partial lists is based on JPL's "Small-Body Orbital Elements" and data available from the Minor Planet Center. Critical list information is also provided by the MPC, unless otherwise specified from Lowell Observatory. A detailed description of the table's columns and additional sources are given on the main page including a complete list of every page in this series, and a statistical break-up on the dynamical classification of minor planets.

Also see the summary list of all named bodies in numerical and alphabetical order, and the corresponding naming citations for the number range of this particular list. New namings may only be added to this list after official publication, as the preannouncement of names is condemned by the Working Group for Small Bodies Nomenclature of the International Astronomical Union.

Near-Earth obj.	MBA (inner)	MBA (outer)	Centaur
Mars-crosser	MBA (middle)	Jupiter trojan	Trans-Neptunian obj.
Unclassified

== 292001–292100 ==
Designation			Discovery			Properties		Ref
Permanent	Provisional	Named after	Date	Site	Discoverer(s)	Category	Diam.	Ref
292001	2006 QG_{117}	—	August 27, 2006	Anderson Mesa	LONEOS	·	1.6 km	MPC · JPL
292002	2006 QJ_{117}	—	August 27, 2006	Anderson Mesa	LONEOS	·	1.7 km	MPC · JPL
292003	2006 QD_{118}	—	August 27, 2006	Anderson Mesa	LONEOS	·	2.3 km	MPC · JPL
292004	2006 QV_{120}	—	August 29, 2006	Catalina	CSS	V	860 m	MPC · JPL
292005	2006 QS_{121}	—	August 29, 2006	Catalina	CSS	·	850 m	MPC · JPL
292006	2006 QL_{123}	—	August 29, 2006	Catalina	CSS	·	2.6 km	MPC · JPL
292007	2006 QH_{124}	—	August 16, 2006	Palomar	NEAT	·	1.6 km	MPC · JPL
292008	2006 QF_{129}	—	August 17, 2006	Palomar	NEAT	·	1.9 km	MPC · JPL
292009	2006 QO_{129}	—	August 18, 2006	Anderson Mesa	LONEOS	·	1.5 km	MPC · JPL
292010	2006 QK_{132}	—	August 22, 2006	Palomar	NEAT	(5)	1.4 km	MPC · JPL
292011	2006 QE_{133}	—	August 23, 2006	Palomar	NEAT	·	1.4 km	MPC · JPL
292012	2006 QE_{136}	—	August 29, 2006	Catalina	CSS	·	770 m	MPC · JPL
292013	2006 QQ_{136}	—	August 29, 2006	Catalina	CSS	MAR	1.2 km	MPC · JPL
292014	2006 QH_{144}	—	August 26, 2006	Reedy Creek	J. Broughton	·	970 m	MPC · JPL
292015	2006 QH_{145}	—	August 18, 2006	Kitt Peak	Spacewatch	THM	2.4 km	MPC · JPL
292016	2006 QU_{145}	—	August 18, 2006	Kitt Peak	Spacewatch	(5)	1.1 km	MPC · JPL
292017	2006 QH_{147}	—	August 18, 2006	Kitt Peak	Spacewatch	·	1.2 km	MPC · JPL
292018	2006 QG_{149}	—	August 18, 2006	Kitt Peak	Spacewatch	·	3.4 km	MPC · JPL
292019	2006 QP_{149}	—	August 18, 2006	Kitt Peak	Spacewatch	·	2.3 km	MPC · JPL
292020	2006 QP_{150}	—	August 19, 2006	Kitt Peak	Spacewatch	·	730 m	MPC · JPL
292021	2006 QE_{152}	—	August 19, 2006	Kitt Peak	Spacewatch	KOR	1.8 km	MPC · JPL
292022	2006 QG_{152}	—	August 19, 2006	Kitt Peak	Spacewatch	AST	1.9 km	MPC · JPL
292023	2006 QL_{155}	—	August 18, 2006	Palomar	NEAT	EUN	1.4 km	MPC · JPL
292024	2006 QZ_{155}	—	August 19, 2006	Kitt Peak	Spacewatch	·	730 m	MPC · JPL
292025	2006 QB_{156}	—	August 19, 2006	Kitt Peak	Spacewatch	·	4.1 km	MPC · JPL
292026	2006 QV_{160}	—	August 19, 2006	Kitt Peak	Spacewatch	·	1.2 km	MPC · JPL
292027	2006 QP_{161}	—	August 19, 2006	Kitt Peak	Spacewatch	·	2.2 km	MPC · JPL
292028	2006 QT_{162}	—	August 21, 2006	Kitt Peak	Spacewatch	V	690 m	MPC · JPL
292029	2006 QM_{165}	—	August 29, 2006	Catalina	CSS	·	1.9 km	MPC · JPL
292030	2006 QN_{165}	—	August 29, 2006	Catalina	CSS	·	2.8 km	MPC · JPL
292031	2006 QR_{165}	—	October 15, 2001	Kitt Peak	Spacewatch	EOS	2.3 km	MPC · JPL
292032	2006 QN_{168}	—	August 30, 2006	Anderson Mesa	LONEOS	·	2.5 km	MPC · JPL
292033	2006 QO_{168}	—	August 30, 2006	Anderson Mesa	LONEOS	·	2.1 km	MPC · JPL
292034	2006 QQ_{168}	—	August 30, 2006	Anderson Mesa	LONEOS	·	3.8 km	MPC · JPL
292035	2006 QS_{168}	—	August 30, 2006	Anderson Mesa	LONEOS	·	2.6 km	MPC · JPL
292036	2006 QR_{169}	—	August 27, 2006	Anderson Mesa	LONEOS	·	6.2 km	MPC · JPL
292037	2006 QN_{176}	—	August 22, 2006	Cerro Tololo	M. W. Buie	BRG	1.4 km	MPC · JPL
292038	2006 QU_{178}	—	August 21, 2006	Kitt Peak	Spacewatch	·	4.3 km	MPC · JPL
292039	2006 QP_{182}	—	August 28, 2006	Apache Point	A. C. Becker	EOS	3.8 km	MPC · JPL
292040	2006 QW_{182}	—	August 19, 2006	Kitt Peak	Spacewatch	·	2.2 km	MPC · JPL
292041	2006 QL_{183}	—	August 28, 2006	Kitt Peak	Spacewatch	·	1.0 km	MPC · JPL
292042	2006 QM_{183}	—	August 28, 2006	Kitt Peak	Spacewatch	KOR	1.7 km	MPC · JPL
292043	2006 QN_{183}	—	August 28, 2006	Catalina	CSS	·	1.3 km	MPC · JPL
292044	2006 QX_{184}	—	August 18, 2006	Kitt Peak	Spacewatch	·	2.3 km	MPC · JPL
292045	2006 QY_{184}	—	August 18, 2006	Kitt Peak	Spacewatch	·	2.2 km	MPC · JPL
292046	2006 QM_{185}	—	August 28, 2006	Kitt Peak	Spacewatch	·	1.4 km	MPC · JPL
292047	2006 QZ_{185}	—	August 28, 2006	Catalina	CSS	NYS	1.2 km	MPC · JPL
292048	2006 QE_{187}	—	August 29, 2006	Kitt Peak	Spacewatch	·	1.3 km	MPC · JPL
292049	2006 QF_{187}	—	August 29, 2006	Kitt Peak	Spacewatch	V	760 m	MPC · JPL
292050	2006 RX_{1}	—	September 13, 2006	Eskridge	Farpoint	·	1.4 km	MPC · JPL
292051 Bohlender	2006 RD_{3}	Bohlender	September 14, 2006	Mauna Kea	D. D. Balam	EOS	2.2 km	MPC · JPL
292052	2006 RC_{4}	—	September 12, 2006	Catalina	CSS	·	1.2 km	MPC · JPL
292053	2006 RG_{5}	—	September 14, 2006	Catalina	CSS	·	3.0 km	MPC · JPL
292054	2006 RN_{5}	—	September 14, 2006	Catalina	CSS	·	1.8 km	MPC · JPL
292055	2006 RE_{6}	—	September 14, 2006	Catalina	CSS	·	4.1 km	MPC · JPL
292056	2006 RZ_{6}	—	September 14, 2006	Catalina	CSS	·	930 m	MPC · JPL
292057	2006 RF_{8}	—	September 12, 2006	Catalina	CSS	·	870 m	MPC · JPL
292058	2006 RL_{8}	—	September 12, 2006	Catalina	CSS	·	1.8 km	MPC · JPL
292059	2006 RR_{9}	—	September 13, 2006	Palomar	NEAT	EOS	2.7 km	MPC · JPL
292060	2006 RD_{10}	—	September 13, 2006	Palomar	NEAT	·	3.5 km	MPC · JPL
292061	2006 RF_{10}	—	September 13, 2006	Palomar	NEAT	EOS	4.9 km	MPC · JPL
292062	2006 RW_{10}	—	September 12, 2006	Catalina	CSS	(2076)	830 m	MPC · JPL
292063	2006 RB_{12}	—	September 13, 2006	Palomar	NEAT	·	1.5 km	MPC · JPL
292064	2006 RS_{12}	—	September 14, 2006	Kitt Peak	Spacewatch	·	1.4 km	MPC · JPL
292065	2006 RS_{13}	—	September 14, 2006	Kitt Peak	Spacewatch	·	940 m	MPC · JPL
292066	2006 RE_{15}	—	September 14, 2006	Kitt Peak	Spacewatch	·	940 m	MPC · JPL
292067	2006 RF_{16}	—	September 14, 2006	Palomar	NEAT	·	1.5 km	MPC · JPL
292068	2006 RP_{16}	—	September 14, 2006	Catalina	CSS	·	1.7 km	MPC · JPL
292069	2006 RP_{17}	—	September 14, 2006	Catalina	CSS	·	2.9 km	MPC · JPL
292070	2006 RH_{18}	—	September 14, 2006	Kitt Peak	Spacewatch	·	1.1 km	MPC · JPL
292071	2006 RP_{18}	—	September 14, 2006	Catalina	CSS	·	900 m	MPC · JPL
292072	2006 RX_{18}	—	September 14, 2006	Palomar	NEAT	·	1.6 km	MPC · JPL
292073	2006 RW_{20}	—	September 15, 2006	Kitt Peak	Spacewatch	VER	2.9 km	MPC · JPL
292074	2006 RB_{21}	—	September 15, 2006	Kitt Peak	Spacewatch	KOR	1.6 km	MPC · JPL
292075	2006 RL_{21}	—	September 15, 2006	Kitt Peak	Spacewatch	·	3.3 km	MPC · JPL
292076	2006 RN_{21}	—	September 15, 2006	Kitt Peak	Spacewatch	·	3.4 km	MPC · JPL
292077	2006 RC_{24}	—	September 13, 2006	Palomar	NEAT	·	1.1 km	MPC · JPL
292078	2006 RF_{26}	—	September 14, 2006	Palomar	NEAT	(2076)	950 m	MPC · JPL
292079	2006 RN_{26}	—	September 14, 2006	Kitt Peak	Spacewatch	·	1.6 km	MPC · JPL
292080	2006 RA_{33}	—	September 15, 2006	Kitt Peak	Spacewatch	·	1.1 km	MPC · JPL
292081	2006 RJ_{33}	—	September 12, 2006	Catalina	CSS	·	1.6 km	MPC · JPL
292082	2006 RU_{33}	—	September 12, 2006	Catalina	CSS	·	2.1 km	MPC · JPL
292083	2006 RB_{34}	—	September 12, 2006	Catalina	CSS	·	1.9 km	MPC · JPL
292084	2006 RH_{34}	—	September 12, 2006	Catalina	CSS	·	4.7 km	MPC · JPL
292085	2006 RS_{34}	—	September 13, 2006	Palomar	NEAT	·	2.6 km	MPC · JPL
292086	2006 RT_{34}	—	September 13, 2006	Palomar	NEAT	·	3.8 km	MPC · JPL
292087	2006 RW_{34}	—	September 14, 2006	Palomar	NEAT	·	1.3 km	MPC · JPL
292088	2006 RN_{35}	—	September 14, 2006	Palomar	NEAT	H	700 m	MPC · JPL
292089	2006 RO_{35}	—	September 14, 2006	Palomar	NEAT	·	4.0 km	MPC · JPL
292090	2006 RT_{35}	—	September 14, 2006	Palomar	NEAT	·	1.7 km	MPC · JPL
292091	2006 RC_{37}	—	September 12, 2006	Catalina	CSS	·	3.3 km	MPC · JPL
292092	2006 RT_{39}	—	September 12, 2006	Catalina	CSS	·	2.6 km	MPC · JPL
292093	2006 RB_{40}	—	September 12, 2006	Catalina	CSS	MRX	1.6 km	MPC · JPL
292094	2006 RS_{42}	—	September 14, 2006	Kitt Peak	Spacewatch	·	1.5 km	MPC · JPL
292095	2006 RX_{43}	—	September 14, 2006	Kitt Peak	Spacewatch	·	1.8 km	MPC · JPL
292096	2006 RV_{44}	—	September 14, 2006	Kitt Peak	Spacewatch	·	2.6 km	MPC · JPL
292097	2006 RD_{46}	—	September 14, 2006	Kitt Peak	Spacewatch	·	2.9 km	MPC · JPL
292098	2006 RO_{46}	—	September 14, 2006	Kitt Peak	Spacewatch	·	2.0 km	MPC · JPL
292099	2006 RC_{47}	—	September 14, 2006	Kitt Peak	Spacewatch	MAS	780 m	MPC · JPL
292100	2006 RJ_{48}	—	September 14, 2006	Catalina	CSS	·	4.0 km	MPC · JPL

== 292101–292200 ==
back to top

Designation			Discovery			Properties		Ref
Permanent	Provisional	Named after	Date	Site	Discoverer(s)	Category	Diam.	Ref
292101	2006 RV_{49}	—	September 14, 2006	Kitt Peak	Spacewatch	·	750 m	MPC · JPL
292102	2006 RE_{50}	—	September 14, 2006	Kitt Peak	Spacewatch	·	1.3 km	MPC · JPL
292103	2006 RM_{50}	—	September 14, 2006	Kitt Peak	Spacewatch	·	3.4 km	MPC · JPL
292104	2006 RS_{50}	—	September 14, 2006	Kitt Peak	Spacewatch	MIS	2.0 km	MPC · JPL
292105	2006 RD_{53}	—	September 14, 2006	Kitt Peak	Spacewatch	MAS	800 m	MPC · JPL
292106	2006 RP_{54}	—	September 14, 2006	Kitt Peak	Spacewatch	·	2.1 km	MPC · JPL
292107	2006 RY_{54}	—	September 14, 2006	Kitt Peak	Spacewatch	EOS	2.4 km	MPC · JPL
292108	2006 RP_{55}	—	September 14, 2006	Kitt Peak	Spacewatch	·	1.3 km	MPC · JPL
292109	2006 RJ_{56}	—	September 14, 2006	Kitt Peak	Spacewatch	KOR	2.0 km	MPC · JPL
292110	2006 RK_{56}	—	September 14, 2006	Kitt Peak	Spacewatch	NYS	1.2 km	MPC · JPL
292111	2006 RZ_{56}	—	September 14, 2006	Kitt Peak	Spacewatch	·	1.4 km	MPC · JPL
292112	2006 RM_{57}	—	September 15, 2006	Kitt Peak	Spacewatch	·	1.2 km	MPC · JPL
292113	2006 RT_{58}	—	September 15, 2006	Kitt Peak	Spacewatch	·	5.2 km	MPC · JPL
292114	2006 RB_{59}	—	September 15, 2006	Kitt Peak	Spacewatch	·	4.3 km	MPC · JPL
292115	2006 RO_{59}	—	September 15, 2006	Kitt Peak	Spacewatch	·	3.4 km	MPC · JPL
292116	2006 RQ_{59}	—	September 15, 2006	Kitt Peak	Spacewatch	·	2.1 km	MPC · JPL
292117	2006 RR_{60}	—	September 13, 2006	Palomar	NEAT	·	2.1 km	MPC · JPL
292118	2006 RR_{63}	—	September 14, 2006	Catalina	CSS	(194)	2.3 km	MPC · JPL
292119	2006 RX_{63}	—	September 12, 2006	Catalina	CSS	·	2.9 km	MPC · JPL
292120	2006 RO_{64}	—	September 13, 2006	Palomar	NEAT	·	2.0 km	MPC · JPL
292121	2006 RN_{66}	—	September 14, 2006	Kitt Peak	Spacewatch	·	800 m	MPC · JPL
292122	2006 RP_{67}	—	September 15, 2006	Kitt Peak	Spacewatch	HNS	1.1 km	MPC · JPL
292123	2006 RA_{68}	—	September 15, 2006	Kitt Peak	Spacewatch	KOR	1.7 km	MPC · JPL
292124	2006 RJ_{71}	—	September 15, 2006	Kitt Peak	Spacewatch	KOR	1.5 km	MPC · JPL
292125	2006 RW_{71}	—	September 15, 2006	Kitt Peak	Spacewatch	VER	3.0 km	MPC · JPL
292126	2006 RT_{72}	—	September 15, 2006	Kitt Peak	Spacewatch	·	3.1 km	MPC · JPL
292127	2006 RK_{73}	—	September 15, 2006	Kitt Peak	Spacewatch	·	2.2 km	MPC · JPL
292128	2006 RF_{74}	—	September 15, 2006	Kitt Peak	Spacewatch	·	2.1 km	MPC · JPL
292129	2006 RS_{74}	—	September 15, 2006	Kitt Peak	Spacewatch	·	2.1 km	MPC · JPL
292130	2006 RB_{75}	—	September 15, 2006	Kitt Peak	Spacewatch	·	1.9 km	MPC · JPL
292131	2006 RN_{75}	—	September 15, 2006	Kitt Peak	Spacewatch	·	2.8 km	MPC · JPL
292132	2006 RT_{76}	—	September 15, 2006	Kitt Peak	Spacewatch	·	1.8 km	MPC · JPL
292133	2006 RY_{76}	—	September 15, 2006	Kitt Peak	Spacewatch	·	2.8 km	MPC · JPL
292134	2006 RZ_{76}	—	September 15, 2006	Kitt Peak	Spacewatch	·	2.7 km	MPC · JPL
292135	2006 RP_{80}	—	September 15, 2006	Kitt Peak	Spacewatch	·	1.8 km	MPC · JPL
292136	2006 RB_{81}	—	September 15, 2006	Kitt Peak	Spacewatch	(16286)	2.1 km	MPC · JPL
292137	2006 RH_{81}	—	September 15, 2006	Kitt Peak	Spacewatch	·	1.3 km	MPC · JPL
292138	2006 RN_{81}	—	September 15, 2006	Kitt Peak	Spacewatch	V	760 m	MPC · JPL
292139	2006 RJ_{82}	—	September 15, 2006	Kitt Peak	Spacewatch	KOR	1.6 km	MPC · JPL
292140	2006 RH_{83}	—	September 15, 2006	Kitt Peak	Spacewatch	·	3.5 km	MPC · JPL
292141	2006 RG_{84}	—	September 15, 2006	Kitt Peak	Spacewatch	EOS	2.1 km	MPC · JPL
292142	2006 RB_{87}	—	September 15, 2006	Kitt Peak	Spacewatch	·	870 m	MPC · JPL
292143	2006 RD_{87}	—	September 15, 2006	Kitt Peak	Spacewatch	HYG	2.6 km	MPC · JPL
292144	2006 RB_{88}	—	September 15, 2006	Kitt Peak	Spacewatch	MAS	670 m	MPC · JPL
292145	2006 RF_{90}	—	September 15, 2006	Kitt Peak	Spacewatch	·	1.2 km	MPC · JPL
292146	2006 RV_{91}	—	September 15, 2006	Kitt Peak	Spacewatch	NYS	1.3 km	MPC · JPL
292147	2006 RL_{93}	—	September 15, 2006	Kitt Peak	Spacewatch	NEM	2.7 km	MPC · JPL
292148	2006 RH_{94}	—	September 15, 2006	Kitt Peak	Spacewatch	·	1.8 km	MPC · JPL
292149	2006 RX_{94}	—	September 15, 2006	Kitt Peak	Spacewatch	(5)	1.1 km	MPC · JPL
292150	2006 RZ_{94}	—	September 15, 2006	Kitt Peak	Spacewatch	HYG	4.0 km	MPC · JPL
292151	2006 RC_{95}	—	September 15, 2006	Kitt Peak	Spacewatch	KOR	1.5 km	MPC · JPL
292152	2006 RO_{96}	—	September 15, 2006	Kitt Peak	Spacewatch	·	1.4 km	MPC · JPL
292153	2006 RZ_{97}	—	September 13, 2006	Palomar	NEAT	·	2.6 km	MPC · JPL
292154	2006 RG_{100}	—	September 14, 2006	Catalina	CSS	·	1.9 km	MPC · JPL
292155	2006 RN_{102}	—	September 14, 2006	Catalina	CSS	·	3.6 km	MPC · JPL
292156	2006 RN_{103}	—	September 15, 2006	Kitt Peak	Spacewatch	·	2.0 km	MPC · JPL
292157	2006 RT_{103}	—	September 11, 2006	Apache Point	A. C. Becker	·	4.6 km	MPC · JPL
292158	2006 RB_{104}	—	September 11, 2006	Apache Point	A. C. Becker	·	2.4 km	MPC · JPL
292159 Jongoldstein	2006 RU_{105}	Jongoldstein	September 14, 2006	Mauna Kea	Masiero, J.	·	1.2 km	MPC · JPL
292160 Davefask	2006 RG_{107}	Davefask	September 14, 2006	Mauna Kea	Masiero, J.	EUN	1.3 km	MPC · JPL
292161	2006 RQ_{120}	—	September 15, 2006	Kitt Peak	Spacewatch	·	1.4 km	MPC · JPL
292162	2006 SO	—	September 16, 2006	Catalina	CSS	EOS	2.6 km	MPC · JPL
292163	2006 SD_{3}	—	September 16, 2006	Socorro	LINEAR	·	1.3 km	MPC · JPL
292164	2006 SM_{4}	—	September 16, 2006	Catalina	CSS	EOS	2.8 km	MPC · JPL
292165	2006 SC_{6}	—	September 16, 2006	Siding Spring	SSS	APO +1km	850 m	MPC · JPL
292166	2006 SV_{7}	—	September 16, 2006	Socorro	LINEAR	·	1.5 km	MPC · JPL
292167	2006 SG_{9}	—	September 16, 2006	Catalina	CSS	·	1.7 km	MPC · JPL
292168	2006 SS_{9}	—	September 16, 2006	Kitt Peak	Spacewatch	·	1.3 km	MPC · JPL
292169	2006 SA_{11}	—	September 16, 2006	Catalina	CSS	fast	1.8 km	MPC · JPL
292170	2006 SP_{11}	—	September 16, 2006	Socorro	LINEAR	·	2.8 km	MPC · JPL
292171	2006 SR_{12}	—	September 16, 2006	Palomar	NEAT	·	940 m	MPC · JPL
292172	2006 SU_{12}	—	September 16, 2006	Palomar	NEAT	·	2.6 km	MPC · JPL
292173	2006 SN_{13}	—	September 17, 2006	Socorro	LINEAR	·	2.2 km	MPC · JPL
292174	2006 SM_{15}	—	September 17, 2006	Catalina	CSS	·	1.5 km	MPC · JPL
292175	2006 ST_{15}	—	September 17, 2006	Catalina	CSS	·	3.5 km	MPC · JPL
292176	2006 SW_{15}	—	September 17, 2006	Catalina	CSS	·	2.2 km	MPC · JPL
292177	2006 SD_{17}	—	September 17, 2006	Kitt Peak	Spacewatch	·	2.2 km	MPC · JPL
292178	2006 SF_{18}	—	September 17, 2006	Kitt Peak	Spacewatch	·	1.3 km	MPC · JPL
292179	2006 SW_{18}	—	September 17, 2006	Kitt Peak	Spacewatch	·	3.5 km	MPC · JPL
292180	2006 SZ_{18}	—	September 17, 2006	Kitt Peak	Spacewatch	NYS	1.0 km	MPC · JPL
292181	2006 SZ_{19}	—	September 19, 2006	La Sagra	OAM	·	3.7 km	MPC · JPL
292182	2006 SB_{20}	—	September 18, 2006	Calvin-Rehoboth	Calvin College	·	760 m	MPC · JPL
292183	2006 SM_{20}	—	September 19, 2006	Eskridge	Farpoint	·	2.3 km	MPC · JPL
292184	2006 SP_{21}	—	September 17, 2006	Catalina	CSS	NAE	4.8 km	MPC · JPL
292185	2006 SA_{22}	—	September 17, 2006	Catalina	CSS	·	2.9 km	MPC · JPL
292186	2006 SG_{22}	—	September 17, 2006	Anderson Mesa	LONEOS	·	2.9 km	MPC · JPL
292187	2006 SN_{25}	—	September 16, 2006	Anderson Mesa	LONEOS	·	1.4 km	MPC · JPL
292188	2006 SW_{27}	—	September 17, 2006	Kitt Peak	Spacewatch	·	1.0 km	MPC · JPL
292189	2006 SN_{28}	—	September 17, 2006	Kitt Peak	Spacewatch	·	2.9 km	MPC · JPL
292190	2006 SZ_{30}	—	September 17, 2006	Kitt Peak	Spacewatch	·	650 m	MPC · JPL
292191	2006 SM_{31}	—	September 17, 2006	Socorro	LINEAR	NYS	1.4 km	MPC · JPL
292192	2006 SZ_{31}	—	September 17, 2006	Kitt Peak	Spacewatch	·	1.6 km	MPC · JPL
292193	2006 ST_{32}	—	September 17, 2006	Kitt Peak	Spacewatch	·	1.3 km	MPC · JPL
292194	2006 SY_{32}	—	September 17, 2006	Kitt Peak	Spacewatch	NYS	1.2 km	MPC · JPL
292195	2006 SE_{33}	—	September 17, 2006	Catalina	CSS	·	2.6 km	MPC · JPL
292196	2006 SK_{33}	—	September 17, 2006	Catalina	CSS	·	840 m	MPC · JPL
292197	2006 SD_{34}	—	September 17, 2006	Catalina	CSS	·	4.1 km	MPC · JPL
292198	2006 SK_{34}	—	September 17, 2006	Catalina	CSS	EUN	1.9 km	MPC · JPL
292199	2006 SM_{34}	—	September 17, 2006	Catalina	CSS	·	2.4 km	MPC · JPL
292200	2006 SS_{34}	—	September 17, 2006	Catalina	CSS	NYS	1.4 km	MPC · JPL

== 292201–292300 ==
back to top

Designation			Discovery			Properties		Ref
Permanent	Provisional	Named after	Date	Site	Discoverer(s)	Category	Diam.	Ref
292201	2006 SV_{34}	—	September 17, 2006	Kitt Peak	Spacewatch	HOF	4.1 km	MPC · JPL
292202	2006 SY_{34}	—	September 17, 2006	Kitt Peak	Spacewatch	·	1.4 km	MPC · JPL
292203	2006 SA_{35}	—	September 17, 2006	Kitt Peak	Spacewatch	PAD	2.0 km	MPC · JPL
292204	2006 SB_{35}	—	September 17, 2006	Kitt Peak	Spacewatch	·	2.6 km	MPC · JPL
292205	2006 SL_{35}	—	September 17, 2006	Anderson Mesa	LONEOS	V	880 m	MPC · JPL
292206	2006 SO_{35}	—	September 17, 2006	Kitt Peak	Spacewatch	HOF	3.1 km	MPC · JPL
292207	2006 SC_{36}	—	September 17, 2006	Anderson Mesa	LONEOS	·	960 m	MPC · JPL
292208	2006 SX_{36}	—	September 17, 2006	Kitt Peak	Spacewatch	·	4.0 km	MPC · JPL
292209	2006 SY_{36}	—	September 17, 2006	Kitt Peak	Spacewatch	·	1.6 km	MPC · JPL
292210	2006 SR_{38}	—	September 18, 2006	Kitt Peak	Spacewatch	HYG	2.9 km	MPC · JPL
292211	2006 SX_{41}	—	September 18, 2006	Anderson Mesa	LONEOS	V	950 m	MPC · JPL
292212	2006 SL_{42}	—	September 18, 2006	Kitt Peak	Spacewatch	MAS	630 m	MPC · JPL
292213	2006 SS_{42}	—	September 18, 2006	Catalina	CSS	·	2.6 km	MPC · JPL
292214	2006 SP_{43}	—	September 16, 2006	Catalina	CSS	·	2.7 km	MPC · JPL
292215	2006 SC_{46}	—	September 18, 2006	Anderson Mesa	LONEOS	·	1.5 km	MPC · JPL
292216	2006 SJ_{46}	—	September 18, 2006	Kitt Peak	Spacewatch	·	1.3 km	MPC · JPL
292217	2006 SB_{48}	—	September 19, 2006	Kitt Peak	Spacewatch	·	2.0 km	MPC · JPL
292218	2006 SC_{49}	—	September 18, 2006	Kitt Peak	Spacewatch	NYS	1.2 km	MPC · JPL
292219	2006 SE_{49}	—	September 19, 2006	Anderson Mesa	LONEOS	NYS	1.7 km	MPC · JPL
292220	2006 SU_{49}	—	September 20, 2006	Kitt Peak	Spacewatch	APO · PHA	470 m	MPC · JPL
292221	2006 SQ_{50}	—	September 16, 2006	Catalina	CSS	·	2.6 km	MPC · JPL
292222	2006 SX_{50}	—	September 17, 2006	Anderson Mesa	LONEOS	V	730 m	MPC · JPL
292223	2006 SN_{51}	—	September 17, 2006	Anderson Mesa	LONEOS	·	4.0 km	MPC · JPL
292224	2006 SW_{53}	—	September 16, 2006	Catalina	CSS	·	2.9 km	MPC · JPL
292225	2006 SS_{55}	—	September 18, 2006	Catalina	CSS	·	930 m	MPC · JPL
292226	2006 SC_{57}	—	September 18, 2006	Calvin-Rehoboth	Calvin College	HOF	2.4 km	MPC · JPL
292227	2006 ST_{59}	—	September 17, 2006	Catalina	CSS	·	1.4 km	MPC · JPL
292228	2006 SB_{60}	—	September 18, 2006	Catalina	CSS	·	3.8 km	MPC · JPL
292229	2006 SL_{60}	—	September 18, 2006	Catalina	CSS	·	1.5 km	MPC · JPL
292230	2006 SR_{60}	—	September 18, 2006	Catalina	CSS	·	2.9 km	MPC · JPL
292231	2006 SE_{62}	—	September 18, 2006	Catalina	CSS	·	2.0 km	MPC · JPL
292232	2006 SY_{62}	—	September 18, 2006	Anderson Mesa	LONEOS	V	820 m	MPC · JPL
292233	2006 SG_{63}	—	September 19, 2006	Anderson Mesa	LONEOS	·	2.8 km	MPC · JPL
292234	2006 SM_{64}	—	September 17, 2006	Kitt Peak	Spacewatch	·	4.1 km	MPC · JPL
292235	2006 SP_{64}	—	September 21, 2006	San Marcello	San Marcello	·	1.8 km	MPC · JPL
292236	2006 SK_{68}	—	September 19, 2006	Catalina	CSS	·	3.5 km	MPC · JPL
292237	2006 SJ_{69}	—	September 19, 2006	Kitt Peak	Spacewatch	·	2.2 km	MPC · JPL
292238	2006 ST_{69}	—	September 19, 2006	Catalina	CSS	·	950 m	MPC · JPL
292239	2006 SN_{70}	—	September 19, 2006	Kitt Peak	Spacewatch	THM	2.8 km	MPC · JPL
292240	2006 SG_{71}	—	September 19, 2006	Kitt Peak	Spacewatch	·	1.3 km	MPC · JPL
292241	2006 SJ_{71}	—	September 19, 2006	Kitt Peak	Spacewatch	(5)	1.2 km	MPC · JPL
292242	2006 SQ_{72}	—	September 19, 2006	Kitt Peak	Spacewatch	3:2	5.7 km	MPC · JPL
292243	2006 SE_{74}	—	September 19, 2006	Kitt Peak	Spacewatch	·	1.3 km	MPC · JPL
292244	2006 SH_{74}	—	September 19, 2006	Kitt Peak	Spacewatch	·	930 m	MPC · JPL
292245	2006 SP_{75}	—	September 19, 2006	Kitt Peak	Spacewatch	·	1.8 km	MPC · JPL
292246	2006 SG_{76}	—	September 19, 2006	Kitt Peak	Spacewatch	·	1.2 km	MPC · JPL
292247	2006 SW_{77}	—	September 20, 2006	Palomar	NEAT	·	3.5 km	MPC · JPL
292248	2006 SF_{78}	—	September 22, 2006	San Marcello	San Marcello	·	2.0 km	MPC · JPL
292249	2006 SP_{80}	—	September 18, 2006	Kitt Peak	Spacewatch	·	1.4 km	MPC · JPL
292250	2006 SZ_{82}	—	September 18, 2006	Kitt Peak	Spacewatch	·	1.6 km	MPC · JPL
292251	2006 SP_{87}	—	September 18, 2006	Kitt Peak	Spacewatch	THM	2.4 km	MPC · JPL
292252	2006 SS_{87}	—	September 18, 2006	Kitt Peak	Spacewatch	·	2.2 km	MPC · JPL
292253	2006 SO_{89}	—	September 18, 2006	Kitt Peak	Spacewatch	·	2.5 km	MPC · JPL
292254	2006 SP_{91}	—	September 18, 2006	Kitt Peak	Spacewatch	VER	2.7 km	MPC · JPL
292255	2006 SQ_{91}	—	September 18, 2006	Kitt Peak	Spacewatch	·	1.0 km	MPC · JPL
292256	2006 SM_{93}	—	September 18, 2006	Kitt Peak	Spacewatch	THM	1.9 km	MPC · JPL
292257	2006 SV_{94}	—	September 18, 2006	Kitt Peak	Spacewatch	·	1.9 km	MPC · JPL
292258	2006 SB_{97}	—	September 18, 2006	Kitt Peak	Spacewatch	EOS	1.9 km	MPC · JPL
292259	2006 SM_{97}	—	September 18, 2006	Kitt Peak	Spacewatch	·	1.4 km	MPC · JPL
292260	2006 SP_{97}	—	September 18, 2006	Kitt Peak	Spacewatch	AEO	1.3 km	MPC · JPL
292261	2006 SU_{98}	—	September 18, 2006	Kitt Peak	Spacewatch	·	2.1 km	MPC · JPL
292262	2006 SJ_{99}	—	September 18, 2006	Kitt Peak	Spacewatch	·	790 m	MPC · JPL
292263	2006 SY_{99}	—	September 18, 2006	Kitt Peak	Spacewatch	·	1.2 km	MPC · JPL
292264	2006 SK_{101}	—	September 19, 2006	Catalina	CSS	NAE	5.8 km	MPC · JPL
292265	2006 SX_{106}	—	September 19, 2006	Kitt Peak	Spacewatch	·	1.6 km	MPC · JPL
292266	2006 SZ_{106}	—	September 19, 2006	Kitt Peak	Spacewatch	·	2.9 km	MPC · JPL
292267	2006 SA_{107}	—	September 19, 2006	Kitt Peak	Spacewatch	·	1.8 km	MPC · JPL
292268	2006 SF_{110}	—	September 20, 2006	Socorro	LINEAR	·	3.8 km	MPC · JPL
292269	2006 SG_{110}	—	September 20, 2006	Anderson Mesa	LONEOS	ERI	1.9 km	MPC · JPL
292270	2006 SP_{110}	—	September 20, 2006	Palomar	NEAT	V	690 m	MPC · JPL
292271	2006 SN_{111}	—	September 22, 2006	Anderson Mesa	LONEOS	EOS	2.3 km	MPC · JPL
292272	2006 SQ_{114}	—	September 23, 2006	Kitt Peak	Spacewatch	HYG	3.6 km	MPC · JPL
292273	2006 SH_{116}	—	September 24, 2006	Kitt Peak	Spacewatch	MAS	1.0 km	MPC · JPL
292274	2006 SX_{119}	—	September 18, 2006	Catalina	CSS	·	1.8 km	MPC · JPL
292275	2006 SB_{120}	—	September 18, 2006	Catalina	CSS	GEF	1.9 km	MPC · JPL
292276	2006 SK_{121}	—	September 18, 2006	Anderson Mesa	LONEOS	HYG	4.0 km	MPC · JPL
292277	2006 SS_{121}	—	September 19, 2006	Eskridge	Farpoint	·	2.6 km	MPC · JPL
292278	2006 ST_{125}	—	September 20, 2006	Palomar	NEAT	(5)	1.1 km	MPC · JPL
292279	2006 SX_{125}	—	September 20, 2006	Palomar	NEAT	V	750 m	MPC · JPL
292280	2006 SE_{126}	—	September 20, 2006	Palomar	NEAT	·	2.4 km	MPC · JPL
292281	2006 SA_{128}	—	September 17, 2006	Catalina	CSS	·	1.9 km	MPC · JPL
292282	2006 SB_{128}	—	September 17, 2006	Catalina	CSS	·	940 m	MPC · JPL
292283	2006 SC_{130}	—	September 19, 2006	Anderson Mesa	LONEOS	AGN	1.7 km	MPC · JPL
292284	2006 SO_{130}	—	September 20, 2006	Anderson Mesa	LONEOS	WIT	1.5 km	MPC · JPL
292285	2006 ST_{130}	—	September 20, 2006	Anderson Mesa	LONEOS	EOS	3.3 km	MPC · JPL
292286	2006 SG_{131}	—	September 25, 2006	Eskridge	Farpoint	·	4.0 km	MPC · JPL
292287	2006 SX_{132}	—	September 16, 2006	Catalina	CSS	MAR	1.2 km	MPC · JPL
292288	2006 SF_{133}	—	September 17, 2006	Catalina	CSS	·	4.9 km	MPC · JPL
292289	2006 SA_{134}	—	September 17, 2006	Catalina	CSS	·	1.8 km	MPC · JPL
292290	2006 SN_{134}	—	September 25, 2006	Socorro	LINEAR	·	3.1 km	MPC · JPL
292291	2006 SZ_{134}	—	September 20, 2006	Anderson Mesa	LONEOS	·	3.4 km	MPC · JPL
292292	2006 SB_{135}	—	September 20, 2006	Palomar	NEAT	·	1.1 km	MPC · JPL
292293	2006 SC_{135}	—	September 20, 2006	Palomar	NEAT	·	4.4 km	MPC · JPL
292294	2006 SS_{137}	—	September 20, 2006	Catalina	CSS	·	1.6 km	MPC · JPL
292295	2006 SA_{140}	—	September 22, 2006	Anderson Mesa	LONEOS	·	4.0 km	MPC · JPL
292296	2006 SD_{140}	—	September 22, 2006	Catalina	CSS	PHO	1.3 km	MPC · JPL
292297	2006 SC_{143}	—	September 19, 2006	Kitt Peak	Spacewatch	·	3.9 km	MPC · JPL
292298	2006 SW_{143}	—	September 19, 2006	Kitt Peak	Spacewatch	(5)	1.5 km	MPC · JPL
292299	2006 SD_{144}	—	September 19, 2006	Kitt Peak	Spacewatch	·	1.1 km	MPC · JPL
292300	2006 SN_{144}	—	September 19, 2006	Kitt Peak	Spacewatch	EOS	1.9 km	MPC · JPL

== 292301–292400 ==
back to top

Designation			Discovery			Properties		Ref
Permanent	Provisional	Named after	Date	Site	Discoverer(s)	Category	Diam.	Ref
292301	2006 SQ_{146}	—	September 19, 2006	Kitt Peak	Spacewatch	·	2.1 km	MPC · JPL
292302	2006 ST_{148}	—	September 19, 2006	Kitt Peak	Spacewatch	·	1.3 km	MPC · JPL
292303	2006 SH_{150}	—	September 19, 2006	Kitt Peak	Spacewatch	·	2.4 km	MPC · JPL
292304	2006 SK_{151}	—	September 19, 2006	Kitt Peak	Spacewatch	·	1.2 km	MPC · JPL
292305	2006 SN_{151}	—	September 19, 2006	Kitt Peak	Spacewatch	·	1.4 km	MPC · JPL
292306	2006 SK_{152}	—	September 19, 2006	Kitt Peak	Spacewatch	·	1.2 km	MPC · JPL
292307	2006 SS_{152}	—	September 19, 2006	Kitt Peak	Spacewatch	·	2.7 km	MPC · JPL
292308	2006 SB_{153}	—	September 20, 2006	Palomar	NEAT	VER	3.8 km	MPC · JPL
292309	2006 SS_{154}	—	September 21, 2006	Anderson Mesa	LONEOS	·	1.3 km	MPC · JPL
292310	2006 SK_{155}	—	September 22, 2006	Catalina	CSS	·	3.3 km	MPC · JPL
292311	2006 SW_{155}	—	September 23, 2006	Kitt Peak	Spacewatch	·	1.6 km	MPC · JPL
292312	2006 SL_{158}	—	September 23, 2006	Kitt Peak	Spacewatch	·	1.8 km	MPC · JPL
292313	2006 SE_{159}	—	September 23, 2006	Kitt Peak	Spacewatch	·	2.9 km	MPC · JPL
292314	2006 SY_{159}	—	September 23, 2006	Kitt Peak	Spacewatch	HYG	3.2 km	MPC · JPL
292315	2006 SX_{161}	—	September 24, 2006	Kitt Peak	Spacewatch	NYS	1.1 km	MPC · JPL
292316	2006 SJ_{163}	—	September 24, 2006	Kitt Peak	Spacewatch	·	2.9 km	MPC · JPL
292317	2006 SG_{164}	—	September 25, 2006	Kitt Peak	Spacewatch	EOS	2.1 km	MPC · JPL
292318	2006 SW_{165}	—	September 25, 2006	Kitt Peak	Spacewatch	·	970 m	MPC · JPL
292319	2006 SA_{166}	—	September 25, 2006	Kitt Peak	Spacewatch	·	4.4 km	MPC · JPL
292320	2006 SN_{166}	—	September 25, 2006	Kitt Peak	Spacewatch	·	2.4 km	MPC · JPL
292321	2006 SK_{169}	—	September 25, 2006	Kitt Peak	Spacewatch	·	2.7 km	MPC · JPL
292322	2006 SQ_{169}	—	September 25, 2006	Kitt Peak	Spacewatch	·	2.0 km	MPC · JPL
292323	2006 SV_{170}	—	September 25, 2006	Kitt Peak	Spacewatch	·	1.9 km	MPC · JPL
292324	2006 SU_{174}	—	September 25, 2006	Mount Lemmon	Mount Lemmon Survey	·	1.7 km	MPC · JPL
292325	2006 SQ_{177}	—	September 25, 2006	Kitt Peak	Spacewatch	·	2.1 km	MPC · JPL
292326	2006 SU_{179}	—	September 25, 2006	Kitt Peak	Spacewatch	HOF	3.2 km	MPC · JPL
292327	2006 SW_{180}	—	September 25, 2006	Mount Lemmon	Mount Lemmon Survey	·	1.8 km	MPC · JPL
292328	2006 SX_{180}	—	September 25, 2006	Mount Lemmon	Mount Lemmon Survey	·	1.5 km	MPC · JPL
292329	2006 SW_{181}	—	September 25, 2006	Anderson Mesa	LONEOS	·	1.1 km	MPC · JPL
292330	2006 SO_{183}	—	September 25, 2006	Mount Lemmon	Mount Lemmon Survey	THM	2.3 km	MPC · JPL
292331	2006 SQ_{183}	—	September 25, 2006	Mount Lemmon	Mount Lemmon Survey	MAS	930 m	MPC · JPL
292332	2006 SX_{183}	—	September 25, 2006	Kitt Peak	Spacewatch	·	1.6 km	MPC · JPL
292333	2006 SZ_{184}	—	September 25, 2006	Mount Lemmon	Mount Lemmon Survey	·	3.3 km	MPC · JPL
292334	2006 SD_{186}	—	September 25, 2006	Mount Lemmon	Mount Lemmon Survey	·	4.5 km	MPC · JPL
292335	2006 SG_{186}	—	September 25, 2006	Kitt Peak	Spacewatch	·	2.8 km	MPC · JPL
292336	2006 SW_{186}	—	September 25, 2006	Mount Lemmon	Mount Lemmon Survey	·	2.2 km	MPC · JPL
292337	2006 SN_{188}	—	September 26, 2006	Kitt Peak	Spacewatch	MAS	760 m	MPC · JPL
292338	2006 SC_{192}	—	September 26, 2006	Mount Lemmon	Mount Lemmon Survey	·	2.5 km	MPC · JPL
292339	2006 SR_{192}	—	September 26, 2006	Mount Lemmon	Mount Lemmon Survey	·	2.4 km	MPC · JPL
292340	2006 SG_{194}	—	September 26, 2006	Kitt Peak	Spacewatch	AGN	1.4 km	MPC · JPL
292341	2006 SM_{195}	—	September 26, 2006	Kitt Peak	Spacewatch	·	3.3 km	MPC · JPL
292342	2006 ST_{196}	—	September 26, 2006	Kitt Peak	Spacewatch	·	2.0 km	MPC · JPL
292343 Yasuosato	2006 SF_{198}	Yasuosato	September 25, 2006	Moletai	Molėtai	·	3.0 km	MPC · JPL
292344	2006 SO_{199}	—	September 24, 2006	Kitt Peak	Spacewatch	·	2.5 km	MPC · JPL
292345	2006 SA_{202}	—	September 24, 2006	Kitt Peak	Spacewatch	·	1.8 km	MPC · JPL
292346	2006 SA_{206}	—	September 25, 2006	Anderson Mesa	LONEOS	·	1.2 km	MPC · JPL
292347	2006 SE_{206}	—	September 25, 2006	Mount Lemmon	Mount Lemmon Survey	·	1.4 km	MPC · JPL
292348	2006 SB_{211}	—	September 26, 2006	Kitt Peak	Spacewatch	(5651)	3.5 km	MPC · JPL
292349	2006 SM_{211}	—	September 26, 2006	Catalina	CSS	·	3.7 km	MPC · JPL
292350	2006 SA_{215}	—	September 27, 2006	Kitt Peak	Spacewatch	·	2.3 km	MPC · JPL
292351	2006 ST_{216}	—	September 27, 2006	Kitt Peak	Spacewatch	·	1.9 km	MPC · JPL
292352 Nicolinha	2006 SU_{218}	Nicolinha	September 26, 2006	Charleston	R. Holmes	·	900 m	MPC · JPL
292353	2006 SB_{220}	—	September 25, 2006	Socorro	LINEAR	EOS	3.0 km	MPC · JPL
292354	2006 SU_{221}	—	September 25, 2006	Mount Lemmon	Mount Lemmon Survey	·	1.2 km	MPC · JPL
292355	2006 SW_{225}	—	September 26, 2006	Kitt Peak	Spacewatch	·	3.2 km	MPC · JPL
292356	2006 SX_{226}	—	September 26, 2006	Kitt Peak	Spacewatch	·	1.7 km	MPC · JPL
292357	2006 SY_{226}	—	September 26, 2006	Kitt Peak	Spacewatch	·	2.5 km	MPC · JPL
292358	2006 SG_{236}	—	September 26, 2006	Mount Lemmon	Mount Lemmon Survey	·	1.2 km	MPC · JPL
292359	2006 SJ_{236}	—	September 26, 2006	Mount Lemmon	Mount Lemmon Survey	·	1.1 km	MPC · JPL
292360	2006 SB_{239}	—	September 26, 2006	Mount Lemmon	Mount Lemmon Survey	·	940 m	MPC · JPL
292361	2006 SL_{240}	—	September 26, 2006	Kitt Peak	Spacewatch	·	3.6 km	MPC · JPL
292362	2006 SD_{241}	—	September 26, 2006	Kitt Peak	Spacewatch	·	470 m	MPC · JPL
292363	2006 SN_{243}	—	September 26, 2006	Kitt Peak	Spacewatch	MAS	790 m	MPC · JPL
292364	2006 SR_{244}	—	September 26, 2006	Kitt Peak	Spacewatch	·	2.9 km	MPC · JPL
292365	2006 SB_{246}	—	September 26, 2006	Mount Lemmon	Mount Lemmon Survey	MAS	980 m	MPC · JPL
292366	2006 SY_{247}	—	September 26, 2006	Mount Lemmon	Mount Lemmon Survey	·	900 m	MPC · JPL
292367	2006 SH_{248}	—	September 26, 2006	Mount Lemmon	Mount Lemmon Survey	MAS	740 m	MPC · JPL
292368	2006 SF_{249}	—	September 26, 2006	Kitt Peak	Spacewatch	·	1.8 km	MPC · JPL
292369	2006 SJ_{249}	—	September 26, 2006	Kitt Peak	Spacewatch	·	1.2 km	MPC · JPL
292370	2006 SK_{250}	—	September 26, 2006	Kitt Peak	Spacewatch	EOS	2.8 km	MPC · JPL
292371	2006 SM_{251}	—	September 26, 2006	Kitt Peak	Spacewatch	·	1.3 km	MPC · JPL
292372	2006 SE_{253}	—	September 26, 2006	Mount Lemmon	Mount Lemmon Survey	EOS	2.2 km	MPC · JPL
292373	2006 SE_{255}	—	September 26, 2006	Catalina	CSS	·	4.3 km	MPC · JPL
292374	2006 SU_{256}	—	September 26, 2006	Kitt Peak	Spacewatch	AGN	1.1 km	MPC · JPL
292375	2006 SA_{257}	—	September 26, 2006	Kitt Peak	Spacewatch	·	1.2 km	MPC · JPL
292376	2006 SF_{257}	—	September 26, 2006	Kitt Peak	Spacewatch	VER	3.7 km	MPC · JPL
292377	2006 ST_{257}	—	September 26, 2006	Kitt Peak	Spacewatch	NYS	1.2 km	MPC · JPL
292378	2006 SD_{258}	—	September 26, 2006	Kitt Peak	Spacewatch	·	2.3 km	MPC · JPL
292379	2006 SQ_{258}	—	September 26, 2006	Kitt Peak	Spacewatch	MAS	840 m	MPC · JPL
292380	2006 SL_{259}	—	September 26, 2006	Kitt Peak	Spacewatch	KOR	1.9 km	MPC · JPL
292381	2006 SM_{261}	—	September 26, 2006	Kitt Peak	Spacewatch	NYS	1.5 km	MPC · JPL
292382	2006 SA_{262}	—	September 26, 2006	Mount Lemmon	Mount Lemmon Survey	·	4.8 km	MPC · JPL
292383	2006 SH_{262}	—	September 26, 2006	Mount Lemmon	Mount Lemmon Survey	·	2.1 km	MPC · JPL
292384	2006 SC_{263}	—	September 26, 2006	Mount Lemmon	Mount Lemmon Survey	·	3.0 km	MPC · JPL
292385	2006 SD_{265}	—	September 26, 2006	Kitt Peak	Spacewatch	EOS	2.4 km	MPC · JPL
292386	2006 SA_{266}	—	September 26, 2006	Kitt Peak	Spacewatch	·	1.9 km	MPC · JPL
292387	2006 SS_{266}	—	September 26, 2006	Kitt Peak	Spacewatch	HYG	4.3 km	MPC · JPL
292388	2006 SA_{267}	—	September 26, 2006	Kitt Peak	Spacewatch	EOS	2.1 km	MPC · JPL
292389	2006 SB_{267}	—	September 26, 2006	Kitt Peak	Spacewatch	·	2.3 km	MPC · JPL
292390	2006 SB_{268}	—	September 26, 2006	Kitt Peak	Spacewatch	·	3.3 km	MPC · JPL
292391	2006 SE_{268}	—	September 26, 2006	Kitt Peak	Spacewatch	·	3.6 km	MPC · JPL
292392	2006 SD_{269}	—	September 26, 2006	Kitt Peak	Spacewatch	·	1.6 km	MPC · JPL
292393	2006 SX_{269}	—	September 26, 2006	Mount Lemmon	Mount Lemmon Survey	·	1.9 km	MPC · JPL
292394	2006 SZ_{269}	—	September 26, 2006	Mount Lemmon	Mount Lemmon Survey	·	1.5 km	MPC · JPL
292395	2006 SA_{273}	—	September 27, 2006	Mount Lemmon	Mount Lemmon Survey	·	3.4 km	MPC · JPL
292396	2006 SW_{274}	—	September 27, 2006	Mount Lemmon	Mount Lemmon Survey	V	770 m	MPC · JPL
292397	2006 SA_{275}	—	September 27, 2006	Kitt Peak	Spacewatch	·	1.8 km	MPC · JPL
292398	2006 SY_{277}	—	September 28, 2006	Socorro	LINEAR	·	2.9 km	MPC · JPL
292399	2006 SY_{278}	—	September 28, 2006	Kitt Peak	Spacewatch	·	3.7 km	MPC · JPL
292400	2006 SH_{279}	—	September 28, 2006	Kitt Peak	Spacewatch	·	1.1 km	MPC · JPL

== 292401–292500 ==
back to top

Designation			Discovery			Properties		Ref
Permanent	Provisional	Named after	Date	Site	Discoverer(s)	Category	Diam.	Ref
292401	2006 SC_{281}	—	September 29, 2006	Anderson Mesa	LONEOS	·	1.9 km	MPC · JPL
292402	2006 SG_{283}	—	September 26, 2006	Socorro	LINEAR	NYS	990 m	MPC · JPL
292403	2006 SS_{284}	—	September 28, 2006	Socorro	LINEAR	·	1.9 km	MPC · JPL
292404	2006 SW_{285}	—	September 25, 2006	Mount Lemmon	Mount Lemmon Survey	·	3.8 km	MPC · JPL
292405	2006 SZ_{285}	—	September 17, 2006	Kitt Peak	Spacewatch	·	1.2 km	MPC · JPL
292406	2006 SE_{286}	—	September 19, 2006	Catalina	CSS	AEG	4.3 km	MPC · JPL
292407	2006 SF_{286}	—	September 19, 2006	Catalina	CSS	·	1.5 km	MPC · JPL
292408	2006 SL_{286}	—	September 19, 2006	Catalina	CSS	ULA · CYB	7.3 km	MPC · JPL
292409	2006 ST_{287}	—	September 22, 2006	Anderson Mesa	LONEOS	·	3.7 km	MPC · JPL
292410	2006 SJ_{288}	—	September 25, 2006	Catalina	CSS	·	3.5 km	MPC · JPL
292411	2006 SF_{290}	—	September 30, 2006	Catalina	CSS	CLA	2.1 km	MPC · JPL
292412	2006 SG_{290}	—	September 30, 2006	Catalina	CSS	·	2.4 km	MPC · JPL
292413	2006 SN_{292}	—	September 25, 2006	Kitt Peak	Spacewatch	EUN	1.7 km	MPC · JPL
292414	2006 SO_{295}	—	September 25, 2006	Kitt Peak	Spacewatch	·	720 m	MPC · JPL
292415	2006 SK_{296}	—	September 25, 2006	Kitt Peak	Spacewatch	·	1.6 km	MPC · JPL
292416	2006 SV_{296}	—	September 25, 2006	Kitt Peak	Spacewatch	·	1.4 km	MPC · JPL
292417	2006 SC_{298}	—	September 25, 2006	Mount Lemmon	Mount Lemmon Survey	·	4.0 km	MPC · JPL
292418	2006 SG_{300}	—	September 26, 2006	Catalina	CSS	·	1.4 km	MPC · JPL
292419	2006 SU_{302}	—	September 27, 2006	Kitt Peak	Spacewatch	NYS	1.2 km	MPC · JPL
292420	2006 ST_{304}	—	September 27, 2006	Kitt Peak	Spacewatch	·	2.7 km	MPC · JPL
292421	2006 SB_{305}	—	September 27, 2006	Kitt Peak	Spacewatch	PAD	2.9 km	MPC · JPL
292422	2006 SP_{306}	—	September 27, 2006	Mount Lemmon	Mount Lemmon Survey	·	2.7 km	MPC · JPL
292423	2006 SM_{311}	—	September 27, 2006	Kitt Peak	Spacewatch	·	1.4 km	MPC · JPL
292424	2006 SP_{313}	—	September 27, 2006	Kitt Peak	Spacewatch	·	1.3 km	MPC · JPL
292425	2006 SW_{313}	—	September 27, 2006	Kitt Peak	Spacewatch	VER	3.0 km	MPC · JPL
292426	2006 SK_{315}	—	September 27, 2006	Kitt Peak	Spacewatch	·	1.8 km	MPC · JPL
292427	2006 SF_{321}	—	September 27, 2006	Kitt Peak	Spacewatch	·	1.0 km	MPC · JPL
292428	2006 SG_{321}	—	September 27, 2006	Kitt Peak	Spacewatch	·	1.5 km	MPC · JPL
292429	2006 SH_{322}	—	September 27, 2006	Kitt Peak	Spacewatch	MAS	550 m	MPC · JPL
292430	2006 SA_{326}	—	September 27, 2006	Kitt Peak	Spacewatch	EOS	2.1 km	MPC · JPL
292431	2006 SD_{330}	—	September 27, 2006	Kitt Peak	Spacewatch	NYS	1.0 km	MPC · JPL
292432	2006 SU_{330}	—	September 28, 2006	Mount Lemmon	Mount Lemmon Survey	·	2.2 km	MPC · JPL
292433	2006 SV_{332}	—	September 28, 2006	Kitt Peak	Spacewatch	MAS	800 m	MPC · JPL
292434	2006 SE_{335}	—	September 28, 2006	Kitt Peak	Spacewatch	·	1.9 km	MPC · JPL
292435	2006 SP_{335}	—	September 28, 2006	Kitt Peak	Spacewatch	HYG	3.0 km	MPC · JPL
292436	2006 SY_{336}	—	September 28, 2006	Kitt Peak	Spacewatch	·	2.2 km	MPC · JPL
292437	2006 SS_{338}	—	September 28, 2006	Kitt Peak	Spacewatch	KON	3.0 km	MPC · JPL
292438	2006 SO_{346}	—	September 28, 2006	Kitt Peak	Spacewatch	·	4.8 km	MPC · JPL
292439	2006 SN_{348}	—	September 28, 2006	Kitt Peak	Spacewatch	·	4.0 km	MPC · JPL
292440	2006 SO_{349}	—	September 29, 2006	Anderson Mesa	LONEOS	·	1.4 km	MPC · JPL
292441	2006 SL_{351}	—	September 30, 2006	Catalina	CSS	·	4.1 km	MPC · JPL
292442	2006 SW_{351}	—	September 30, 2006	Catalina	CSS	·	2.6 km	MPC · JPL
292443	2006 SB_{352}	—	September 30, 2006	Catalina	CSS	·	3.4 km	MPC · JPL
292444	2006 SJ_{353}	—	September 30, 2006	Catalina	CSS	·	1.4 km	MPC · JPL
292445	2006 SY_{353}	—	September 30, 2006	Catalina	CSS	EOS	2.4 km	MPC · JPL
292446	2006 SY_{355}	—	September 30, 2006	Catalina	CSS	·	3.4 km	MPC · JPL
292447	2006 SL_{357}	—	September 30, 2006	Catalina	CSS	·	5.3 km	MPC · JPL
292448	2006 SN_{357}	—	September 30, 2006	Catalina	CSS	·	3.4 km	MPC · JPL
292449	2006 SO_{357}	—	September 30, 2006	Mount Lemmon	Mount Lemmon Survey	EOS	2.6 km	MPC · JPL
292450	2006 SV_{358}	—	September 30, 2006	Catalina	CSS	·	650 m	MPC · JPL
292451	2006 SF_{359}	—	September 30, 2006	Catalina	CSS	·	2.3 km	MPC · JPL
292452	2006 SU_{359}	—	September 30, 2006	Catalina	CSS	·	1.9 km	MPC · JPL
292453	2006 SX_{359}	—	September 30, 2006	Junk Bond	D. Healy	·	830 m	MPC · JPL
292454	2006 SQ_{360}	—	September 30, 2006	Mount Lemmon	Mount Lemmon Survey	·	3.3 km	MPC · JPL
292455	2006 SX_{360}	—	September 30, 2006	Mount Lemmon	Mount Lemmon Survey	LIX	4.0 km	MPC · JPL
292456	2006 SR_{362}	—	September 30, 2006	Mount Lemmon	Mount Lemmon Survey	·	2.5 km	MPC · JPL
292457	2006 SW_{365}	—	September 30, 2006	Mount Lemmon	Mount Lemmon Survey	·	2.5 km	MPC · JPL
292458	2006 SE_{366}	—	September 30, 2006	Mount Lemmon	Mount Lemmon Survey	·	4.1 km	MPC · JPL
292459 Antoniolasciac	2006 SO_{366}	Antoniolasciac	September 29, 2006	Farra d'Isonzo	Farra d'Isonzo	EOS	2.5 km	MPC · JPL
292460	2006 SH_{372}	—	September 23, 2006	Kitt Peak	Spacewatch	·	1.1 km	MPC · JPL
292461	2006 SA_{373}	—	September 28, 2006	Catalina	CSS	EOS	2.6 km	MPC · JPL
292462	2006 SZ_{373}	—	September 16, 2006	Apache Point	A. C. Becker	·	3.6 km	MPC · JPL
292463	2006 SN_{375}	—	September 17, 2006	Apache Point	A. C. Becker	EOS	2.1 km	MPC · JPL
292464	2006 SU_{375}	—	September 17, 2006	Apache Point	A. C. Becker	AGN	1.5 km	MPC · JPL
292465	2006 SY_{375}	—	September 17, 2006	Apache Point	A. C. Becker	·	3.1 km	MPC · JPL
292466	2006 SX_{377}	—	September 17, 2006	Apache Point	A. C. Becker	·	1.9 km	MPC · JPL
292467	2006 SE_{378}	—	September 18, 2006	Apache Point	A. C. Becker	·	2.2 km	MPC · JPL
292468	2006 SP_{380}	—	September 27, 2006	Apache Point	A. C. Becker	PHO	2.5 km	MPC · JPL
292469	2006 ST_{380}	—	September 27, 2006	Apache Point	A. C. Becker	·	1.5 km	MPC · JPL
292470	2006 SB_{382}	—	September 28, 2006	Apache Point	A. C. Becker	·	4.8 km	MPC · JPL
292471	2006 SQ_{387}	—	September 30, 2006	Apache Point	A. C. Becker	·	4.2 km	MPC · JPL
292472	2006 SX_{388}	—	September 30, 2006	Apache Point	A. C. Becker	·	3.6 km	MPC · JPL
292473	2006 SS_{389}	—	September 30, 2006	Apache Point	A. C. Becker	·	3.0 km	MPC · JPL
292474	2006 SV_{390}	—	September 17, 2006	Catalina	CSS	·	1.4 km	MPC · JPL
292475	2006 SF_{391}	—	September 17, 2006	Kitt Peak	Spacewatch	·	2.4 km	MPC · JPL
292476	2006 SB_{392}	—	September 19, 2006	Kitt Peak	Spacewatch	·	1.9 km	MPC · JPL
292477	2006 SD_{392}	—	September 19, 2006	Kitt Peak	Spacewatch	·	1.9 km	MPC · JPL
292478	2006 SG_{392}	—	September 25, 2006	Kitt Peak	Spacewatch	EOS	2.1 km	MPC · JPL
292479	2006 ST_{392}	—	September 26, 2006	Kitt Peak	Spacewatch	·	1.8 km	MPC · JPL
292480	2006 SQ_{393}	—	September 28, 2006	Kitt Peak	Spacewatch	·	1.7 km	MPC · JPL
292481	2006 ST_{393}	—	September 30, 2006	Mount Lemmon	Mount Lemmon Survey	·	3.1 km	MPC · JPL
292482	2006 SM_{398}	—	September 16, 2006	Kitt Peak	Spacewatch	·	1.0 km	MPC · JPL
292483	2006 SR_{398}	—	September 17, 2006	Kitt Peak	Spacewatch	·	880 m	MPC · JPL
292484	2006 SV_{399}	—	September 18, 2006	Catalina	CSS	·	1.6 km	MPC · JPL
292485	2006 SZ_{399}	—	September 18, 2006	Kitt Peak	Spacewatch	·	930 m	MPC · JPL
292486	2006 SK_{400}	—	September 19, 2006	Catalina	CSS	·	2.0 km	MPC · JPL
292487	2006 SB_{401}	—	September 26, 2006	Mount Lemmon	Mount Lemmon Survey	·	1.6 km	MPC · JPL
292488	2006 SJ_{401}	—	September 27, 2006	Mount Lemmon	Mount Lemmon Survey	·	2.3 km	MPC · JPL
292489	2006 SV_{401}	—	September 28, 2006	Mount Lemmon	Mount Lemmon Survey	·	1.4 km	MPC · JPL
292490 Sienkiewicz	2006 SH_{406}	Sienkiewicz	September 24, 2006	Moletai	K. Černis	ADE	2.4 km	MPC · JPL
292491	2006 SK_{406}	—	September 28, 2006	Kitt Peak	Spacewatch	·	1.6 km	MPC · JPL
292492	2006 SZ_{406}	—	September 26, 2006	Catalina	CSS	TIR	3.8 km	MPC · JPL
292493	2006 SS_{410}	—	September 18, 2006	Kitt Peak	Spacewatch	·	3.1 km	MPC · JPL
292494	2006 SM_{412}	—	September 28, 2006	Catalina	CSS	·	5.3 km	MPC · JPL
292495	2006 SP_{413}	—	September 30, 2006	Catalina	CSS	·	3.5 km	MPC · JPL
292496	2006 TU_{4}	—	October 2, 2006	Mount Lemmon	Mount Lemmon Survey	·	3.9 km	MPC · JPL
292497	2006 TX_{7}	—	October 12, 2006	Kanab	Sheridan, E.	·	2.0 km	MPC · JPL
292498	2006 TQ_{9}	—	October 1, 2006	Piszkéstető	K. Sárneczky	·	3.0 km	MPC · JPL
292499	2006 TQ_{10}	—	October 14, 2006	Piszkéstető	K. Sárneczky, Kuli, Z.	·	3.6 km	MPC · JPL
292500	2006 TB_{13}	—	October 10, 2006	Palomar	NEAT	·	1.6 km	MPC · JPL

== 292501–292600 ==
back to top

Designation			Discovery			Properties		Ref
Permanent	Provisional	Named after	Date	Site	Discoverer(s)	Category	Diam.	Ref
292501	2006 TO_{13}	—	October 10, 2006	Palomar	NEAT	·	4.6 km	MPC · JPL
292502	2006 TW_{13}	—	October 10, 2006	Palomar	NEAT	·	2.4 km	MPC · JPL
292503	2006 TD_{15}	—	October 11, 2006	Kitt Peak	Spacewatch	·	1.4 km	MPC · JPL
292504	2006 TC_{16}	—	October 11, 2006	Kitt Peak	Spacewatch	·	2.5 km	MPC · JPL
292505	2006 TJ_{17}	—	October 11, 2006	Kitt Peak	Spacewatch	·	1.2 km	MPC · JPL
292506	2006 TW_{17}	—	October 11, 2006	Kitt Peak	Spacewatch	·	2.5 km	MPC · JPL
292507	2006 TB_{18}	—	October 11, 2006	Kitt Peak	Spacewatch	·	3.3 km	MPC · JPL
292508	2006 TP_{18}	—	October 11, 2006	Kitt Peak	Spacewatch	·	3.7 km	MPC · JPL
292509	2006 TS_{20}	—	October 11, 2006	Kitt Peak	Spacewatch	·	3.4 km	MPC · JPL
292510	2006 TP_{22}	—	October 11, 2006	Kitt Peak	Spacewatch	·	2.3 km	MPC · JPL
292511	2006 TL_{24}	—	October 12, 2006	Kitt Peak	Spacewatch	·	2.2 km	MPC · JPL
292512	2006 TS_{26}	—	October 12, 2006	Kitt Peak	Spacewatch	·	1.7 km	MPC · JPL
292513	2006 TU_{27}	—	October 12, 2006	Kitt Peak	Spacewatch	·	3.2 km	MPC · JPL
292514	2006 TU_{28}	—	October 12, 2006	Kitt Peak	Spacewatch	·	2.4 km	MPC · JPL
292515	2006 TA_{31}	—	October 12, 2006	Kitt Peak	Spacewatch	·	1.3 km	MPC · JPL
292516	2006 TN_{31}	—	October 12, 2006	Kitt Peak	Spacewatch	·	3.3 km	MPC · JPL
292517	2006 TA_{32}	—	October 12, 2006	Kitt Peak	Spacewatch	·	2.3 km	MPC · JPL
292518	2006 TL_{32}	—	October 12, 2006	Kitt Peak	Spacewatch	·	1.7 km	MPC · JPL
292519	2006 TU_{32}	—	October 12, 2006	Kitt Peak	Spacewatch	·	740 m	MPC · JPL
292520	2006 TH_{34}	—	October 12, 2006	Kitt Peak	Spacewatch	·	2.2 km	MPC · JPL
292521	2006 TW_{35}	—	October 12, 2006	Kitt Peak	Spacewatch	MRX	990 m	MPC · JPL
292522	2006 TH_{36}	—	October 12, 2006	Kitt Peak	Spacewatch	PHO	1.2 km	MPC · JPL
292523	2006 TY_{36}	—	October 12, 2006	Kitt Peak	Spacewatch	·	2.0 km	MPC · JPL
292524	2006 TZ_{36}	—	October 12, 2006	Kitt Peak	Spacewatch	V	850 m	MPC · JPL
292525	2006 TM_{37}	—	October 12, 2006	Kitt Peak	Spacewatch	MIS	1.9 km	MPC · JPL
292526	2006 TX_{37}	—	October 12, 2006	Kitt Peak	Spacewatch	THM	2.5 km	MPC · JPL
292527	2006 TD_{38}	—	October 12, 2006	Kitt Peak	Spacewatch	EUN	2.3 km	MPC · JPL
292528	2006 TL_{39}	—	October 12, 2006	Kitt Peak	Spacewatch	THM	2.2 km	MPC · JPL
292529	2006 TD_{40}	—	October 12, 2006	Kitt Peak	Spacewatch	·	2.2 km	MPC · JPL
292530	2006 TZ_{40}	—	October 12, 2006	Kitt Peak	Spacewatch	·	1.8 km	MPC · JPL
292531	2006 TH_{41}	—	October 12, 2006	Kitt Peak	Spacewatch	·	2.8 km	MPC · JPL
292532	2006 TO_{44}	—	October 12, 2006	Kitt Peak	Spacewatch	THM	2.7 km	MPC · JPL
292533	2006 TH_{45}	—	October 12, 2006	Kitt Peak	Spacewatch	THM	2.8 km	MPC · JPL
292534	2006 TR_{45}	—	October 12, 2006	Kitt Peak	Spacewatch	·	2.1 km	MPC · JPL
292535	2006 TY_{45}	—	October 12, 2006	Kitt Peak	Spacewatch	KOR	1.4 km	MPC · JPL
292536	2006 TN_{46}	—	October 12, 2006	Kitt Peak	Spacewatch	NEM	2.0 km	MPC · JPL
292537	2006 TO_{46}	—	October 12, 2006	Kitt Peak	Spacewatch	HOF	3.2 km	MPC · JPL
292538	2006 TU_{46}	—	October 12, 2006	Kitt Peak	Spacewatch	·	860 m	MPC · JPL
292539	2006 TC_{47}	—	October 12, 2006	Kitt Peak	Spacewatch	·	1.9 km	MPC · JPL
292540	2006 TV_{47}	—	October 12, 2006	Kitt Peak	Spacewatch	·	1.3 km	MPC · JPL
292541	2006 TC_{48}	—	October 12, 2006	Kitt Peak	Spacewatch	·	2.8 km	MPC · JPL
292542	2006 TH_{48}	—	October 12, 2006	Kitt Peak	Spacewatch	MAS	780 m	MPC · JPL
292543	2006 TF_{50}	—	October 12, 2006	Palomar	NEAT	·	1.3 km	MPC · JPL
292544	2006 TT_{53}	—	October 12, 2006	Kitt Peak	Spacewatch	EOS	2.9 km	MPC · JPL
292545	2006 TQ_{54}	—	October 12, 2006	Palomar	NEAT	SUL	2.7 km	MPC · JPL
292546	2006 TT_{54}	—	October 12, 2006	Palomar	NEAT	·	1.1 km	MPC · JPL
292547	2006 TE_{55}	—	October 12, 2006	Palomar	NEAT	LIX	4.6 km	MPC · JPL
292548	2006 TR_{55}	—	October 12, 2006	Palomar	NEAT	·	2.8 km	MPC · JPL
292549	2006 TL_{60}	—	October 13, 2006	Kitt Peak	Spacewatch	AGN	1.3 km	MPC · JPL
292550	2006 TV_{60}	—	October 14, 2006	Bergisch Gladbach	W. Bickel	·	920 m	MPC · JPL
292551	2006 TR_{61}	—	October 3, 2006	Catalina	CSS	·	3.8 km	MPC · JPL
292552	2006 TF_{63}	—	October 10, 2006	Palomar	NEAT	EOS	2.2 km	MPC · JPL
292553	2006 TJ_{64}	—	October 11, 2006	Palomar	NEAT	·	1.4 km	MPC · JPL
292554	2006 TS_{65}	—	October 11, 2006	Palomar	NEAT	·	1.1 km	MPC · JPL
292555	2006 TP_{66}	—	October 11, 2006	Palomar	NEAT	·	3.0 km	MPC · JPL
292556	2006 TX_{66}	—	October 11, 2006	Palomar	NEAT	·	3.0 km	MPC · JPL
292557	2006 TF_{67}	—	October 11, 2006	Palomar	NEAT	·	4.4 km	MPC · JPL
292558	2006 TP_{69}	—	October 11, 2006	Palomar	NEAT	·	1.4 km	MPC · JPL
292559	2006 TY_{69}	—	October 11, 2006	Palomar	NEAT	·	1.4 km	MPC · JPL
292560	2006 TR_{70}	—	October 11, 2006	Palomar	NEAT	·	3.0 km	MPC · JPL
292561	2006 TT_{70}	—	October 11, 2006	Palomar	NEAT	EOS	2.7 km	MPC · JPL
292562	2006 TF_{71}	—	October 11, 2006	Palomar	NEAT	NYS	1.3 km	MPC · JPL
292563	2006 TG_{71}	—	October 11, 2006	Palomar	NEAT	·	3.5 km	MPC · JPL
292564	2006 TL_{71}	—	October 11, 2006	Palomar	NEAT	·	3.3 km	MPC · JPL
292565	2006 TJ_{73}	—	October 11, 2006	Palomar	NEAT	·	3.0 km	MPC · JPL
292566	2006 TO_{75}	—	October 11, 2006	Palomar	NEAT	·	3.1 km	MPC · JPL
292567	2006 TJ_{76}	—	October 11, 2006	Palomar	NEAT	·	2.0 km	MPC · JPL
292568	2006 TT_{76}	—	October 11, 2006	Palomar	NEAT	·	4.5 km	MPC · JPL
292569	2006 TX_{76}	—	October 11, 2006	Palomar	NEAT	·	6.4 km	MPC · JPL
292570	2006 TW_{78}	—	October 12, 2006	Palomar	NEAT	·	4.0 km	MPC · JPL
292571	2006 TN_{79}	—	October 13, 2006	Kitt Peak	Spacewatch	·	3.5 km	MPC · JPL
292572	2006 TH_{80}	—	October 13, 2006	Kitt Peak	Spacewatch	·	3.1 km	MPC · JPL
292573	2006 TY_{80}	—	October 13, 2006	Kitt Peak	Spacewatch	HYG	3.7 km	MPC · JPL
292574	2006 TC_{83}	—	October 13, 2006	Kitt Peak	Spacewatch	·	5.8 km	MPC · JPL
292575	2006 TW_{84}	—	October 13, 2006	Kitt Peak	Spacewatch	·	3.5 km	MPC · JPL
292576	2006 TD_{87}	—	October 13, 2006	Kitt Peak	Spacewatch	·	1.4 km	MPC · JPL
292577	2006 TG_{87}	—	October 13, 2006	Kitt Peak	Spacewatch	·	2.2 km	MPC · JPL
292578	2006 TU_{87}	—	October 13, 2006	Kitt Peak	Spacewatch	·	4.0 km	MPC · JPL
292579	2006 TR_{89}	—	October 13, 2006	Kitt Peak	Spacewatch	·	2.3 km	MPC · JPL
292580	2006 TX_{89}	—	October 13, 2006	Kitt Peak	Spacewatch	·	1.1 km	MPC · JPL
292581	2006 TJ_{91}	—	October 13, 2006	Kitt Peak	Spacewatch	·	1.9 km	MPC · JPL
292582	2006 TT_{91}	—	October 13, 2006	Kitt Peak	Spacewatch	·	1.9 km	MPC · JPL
292583	2006 TT_{92}	—	October 15, 2006	Kitt Peak	Spacewatch	·	3.2 km	MPC · JPL
292584	2006 TH_{94}	—	October 15, 2006	Catalina	CSS	NEM	2.8 km	MPC · JPL
292585	2006 TP_{95}	—	October 11, 2006	Palomar	NEAT	H	560 m	MPC · JPL
292586	2006 TG_{97}	—	October 13, 2006	Kitt Peak	Spacewatch	·	1.2 km	MPC · JPL
292587	2006 TT_{98}	—	October 15, 2006	Kitt Peak	Spacewatch	·	2.6 km	MPC · JPL
292588	2006 TL_{99}	—	October 15, 2006	Kitt Peak	Spacewatch	·	3.9 km	MPC · JPL
292589	2006 TC_{100}	—	October 15, 2006	Kitt Peak	Spacewatch	·	1.8 km	MPC · JPL
292590	2006 TB_{101}	—	October 15, 2006	Kitt Peak	Spacewatch	HOF	2.7 km	MPC · JPL
292591	2006 TQ_{101}	—	October 15, 2006	Kitt Peak	Spacewatch	·	1.7 km	MPC · JPL
292592	2006 TW_{101}	—	October 15, 2006	Kitt Peak	Spacewatch	EOS	2.3 km	MPC · JPL
292593	2006 TY_{101}	—	October 15, 2006	Kitt Peak	Spacewatch	·	3.4 km	MPC · JPL
292594	2006 TL_{103}	—	October 15, 2006	Kitt Peak	Spacewatch	THM	2.5 km	MPC · JPL
292595	2006 TH_{104}	—	October 15, 2006	Kitt Peak	Spacewatch	NYS	1.2 km	MPC · JPL
292596	2006 TN_{105}	—	October 15, 2006	Kitt Peak	Spacewatch	·	3.9 km	MPC · JPL
292597	2006 TO_{106}	—	October 15, 2006	Catalina	CSS	·	760 m	MPC · JPL
292598	2006 TT_{106}	—	October 15, 2006	Lulin	Lin, C.-S., Q. Ye	·	2.9 km	MPC · JPL
292599	2006 TR_{107}	—	October 12, 2006	Siding Spring	SSS	·	5.4 km	MPC · JPL
292600	2006 TU_{107}	—	October 11, 2006	Apache Point	SDSS	L4	10 km	MPC · JPL

== 292601–292700 ==
back to top

Designation			Discovery			Properties		Ref
Permanent	Provisional	Named after	Date	Site	Discoverer(s)	Category	Diam.	Ref
292601	2006 TX_{108}	—	October 2, 2006	Mount Lemmon	Mount Lemmon Survey	·	1.4 km	MPC · JPL
292602	2006 TZ_{108}	—	October 2, 2006	Catalina	CSS	·	4.0 km	MPC · JPL
292603	2006 TC_{109}	—	October 2, 2006	Mount Lemmon	Mount Lemmon Survey	·	2.7 km	MPC · JPL
292604	2006 TN_{109}	—	October 4, 2006	Mount Lemmon	Mount Lemmon Survey	·	890 m	MPC · JPL
292605	2006 TS_{111}	—	October 1, 2006	Apache Point	A. C. Becker	EOS	2.7 km	MPC · JPL
292606	2006 TD_{115}	—	October 1, 2006	Apache Point	A. C. Becker	·	3.9 km	MPC · JPL
292607	2006 TX_{115}	—	October 2, 2006	Apache Point	A. C. Becker	EOS	2.3 km	MPC · JPL
292608	2006 TA_{117}	—	October 3, 2006	Apache Point	A. C. Becker	·	2.5 km	MPC · JPL
292609	2006 TW_{120}	—	October 12, 2006	Apache Point	A. C. Becker	·	3.8 km	MPC · JPL
292610	2006 TW_{121}	—	October 4, 2006	Mount Lemmon	Mount Lemmon Survey	·	1.9 km	MPC · JPL
292611	2006 TN_{124}	—	October 3, 2006	Mount Lemmon	Mount Lemmon Survey	·	2.2 km	MPC · JPL
292612	2006 TB_{128}	—	October 13, 2006	Kitt Peak	Spacewatch	·	4.1 km	MPC · JPL
292613	2006 TL_{128}	—	October 15, 2006	Kitt Peak	Spacewatch	·	1.1 km	MPC · JPL
292614	2006 TO_{129}	—	October 2, 2006	Mount Lemmon	Mount Lemmon Survey	MAR	1.2 km	MPC · JPL
292615	2006 UC_{1}	—	October 16, 2006	Altschwendt	W. Ries	·	2.2 km	MPC · JPL
292616	2006 UE_{1}	—	October 16, 2006	Piszkéstető	K. Sárneczky, Kuli, Z.	EOS	2.8 km	MPC · JPL
292617	2006 US_{2}	—	October 16, 2006	Mount Lemmon	Mount Lemmon Survey	·	4.0 km	MPC · JPL
292618	2006 UC_{3}	—	October 16, 2006	Catalina	CSS	THM	2.8 km	MPC · JPL
292619	2006 UH_{5}	—	October 16, 2006	Catalina	CSS	·	890 m	MPC · JPL
292620	2006 UL_{6}	—	October 16, 2006	Catalina	CSS	MAS	820 m	MPC · JPL
292621	2006 UD_{7}	—	October 16, 2006	Catalina	CSS	·	1.8 km	MPC · JPL
292622	2006 UN_{7}	—	October 16, 2006	Catalina	CSS	·	1.9 km	MPC · JPL
292623	2006 UD_{9}	—	October 16, 2006	Catalina	CSS	·	5.1 km	MPC · JPL
292624	2006 UG_{9}	—	October 16, 2006	Catalina	CSS	HYG	3.6 km	MPC · JPL
292625	2006 UH_{18}	—	October 16, 2006	Bergisch Gladbach	W. Bickel	·	790 m	MPC · JPL
292626	2006 UP_{19}	—	October 16, 2006	Kitt Peak	Spacewatch	·	1.8 km	MPC · JPL
292627	2006 UW_{19}	—	October 16, 2006	Kitt Peak	Spacewatch	·	3.9 km	MPC · JPL
292628	2006 UL_{20}	—	October 16, 2006	Kitt Peak	Spacewatch	·	3.9 km	MPC · JPL
292629	2006 UQ_{21}	—	October 16, 2006	Kitt Peak	Spacewatch	·	1.6 km	MPC · JPL
292630	2006 UD_{23}	—	October 16, 2006	Calvin-Rehoboth	L. A. Molnar	NYS	1 km	MPC · JPL
292631	2006 UZ_{23}	—	October 16, 2006	Kitt Peak	Spacewatch	·	3.8 km	MPC · JPL
292632	2006 UR_{24}	—	October 16, 2006	Kitt Peak	Spacewatch	HYG	2.9 km	MPC · JPL
292633	2006 UL_{25}	—	October 16, 2006	Kitt Peak	Spacewatch	NYS	1.3 km	MPC · JPL
292634	2006 UB_{27}	—	October 16, 2006	Kitt Peak	Spacewatch	KOR	1.4 km	MPC · JPL
292635	2006 UG_{27}	—	October 16, 2006	Kitt Peak	Spacewatch	·	1.2 km	MPC · JPL
292636	2006 UM_{29}	—	October 16, 2006	Kitt Peak	Spacewatch	·	1.2 km	MPC · JPL
292637	2006 UW_{29}	—	October 16, 2006	Kitt Peak	Spacewatch	·	2.9 km	MPC · JPL
292638	2006 UC_{30}	—	October 16, 2006	Kitt Peak	Spacewatch	KOR	1.6 km	MPC · JPL
292639	2006 UG_{33}	—	October 16, 2006	Kitt Peak	Spacewatch	·	1.1 km	MPC · JPL
292640	2006 UZ_{34}	—	October 16, 2006	Kitt Peak	Spacewatch	·	4.8 km	MPC · JPL
292641	2006 UZ_{35}	—	October 16, 2006	Kitt Peak	Spacewatch	V	670 m	MPC · JPL
292642	2006 UT_{36}	—	October 16, 2006	Kitt Peak	Spacewatch	·	2.0 km	MPC · JPL
292643	2006 UD_{37}	—	October 16, 2006	Kitt Peak	Spacewatch	·	1.6 km	MPC · JPL
292644	2006 UB_{38}	—	October 16, 2006	Kitt Peak	Spacewatch	·	720 m	MPC · JPL
292645	2006 UP_{38}	—	October 16, 2006	Kitt Peak	Spacewatch	·	1.1 km	MPC · JPL
292646	2006 UT_{38}	—	October 16, 2006	Kitt Peak	Spacewatch	·	3.3 km	MPC · JPL
292647	2006 UT_{39}	—	October 16, 2006	Kitt Peak	Spacewatch	·	1.5 km	MPC · JPL
292648	2006 UB_{44}	—	October 16, 2006	Kitt Peak	Spacewatch	·	800 m	MPC · JPL
292649	2006 UG_{45}	—	October 16, 2006	Kitt Peak	Spacewatch	BRA	1.7 km	MPC · JPL
292650	2006 UZ_{50}	—	October 17, 2006	Mount Lemmon	Mount Lemmon Survey	·	1.6 km	MPC · JPL
292651	2006 UP_{51}	—	October 17, 2006	Kitt Peak	Spacewatch	·	2.0 km	MPC · JPL
292652	2006 UR_{51}	—	October 17, 2006	Kitt Peak	Spacewatch	·	4.2 km	MPC · JPL
292653	2006 UB_{52}	—	October 17, 2006	Mount Lemmon	Mount Lemmon Survey	·	1.1 km	MPC · JPL
292654	2006 UO_{52}	—	October 17, 2006	Catalina	CSS	·	2.9 km	MPC · JPL
292655	2006 UP_{52}	—	October 17, 2006	Catalina	CSS	·	3.4 km	MPC · JPL
292656	2006 UC_{53}	—	October 17, 2006	Mount Lemmon	Mount Lemmon Survey	THM	2.6 km	MPC · JPL
292657	2006 UY_{53}	—	October 17, 2006	Mount Lemmon	Mount Lemmon Survey	·	5.3 km	MPC · JPL
292658	2006 UQ_{54}	—	October 17, 2006	Catalina	CSS	·	4.3 km	MPC · JPL
292659	2006 UK_{57}	—	October 18, 2006	Kitt Peak	Spacewatch	V	710 m	MPC · JPL
292660	2006 UZ_{57}	—	October 18, 2006	Kitt Peak	Spacewatch	·	1.6 km	MPC · JPL
292661	2006 UV_{58}	—	October 19, 2006	Mount Lemmon	Mount Lemmon Survey	·	2.7 km	MPC · JPL
292662	2006 UA_{60}	—	October 19, 2006	Catalina	CSS	·	4.1 km	MPC · JPL
292663	2006 UC_{62}	—	October 21, 2006	Desert Moon	Stevens, B. L.	·	3.7 km	MPC · JPL
292664	2006 UL_{65}	—	October 16, 2006	Mount Lemmon	Mount Lemmon Survey	KOR	1.7 km	MPC · JPL
292665	2006 UO_{66}	—	October 16, 2006	Kitt Peak	Spacewatch	V	590 m	MPC · JPL
292666	2006 UY_{66}	—	October 16, 2006	Mount Lemmon	Mount Lemmon Survey	·	3.1 km	MPC · JPL
292667	2006 UD_{69}	—	October 16, 2006	Catalina	CSS	·	3.7 km	MPC · JPL
292668	2006 UX_{69}	—	October 16, 2006	Catalina	CSS	·	1.6 km	MPC · JPL
292669	2006 UM_{74}	—	October 17, 2006	Kitt Peak	Spacewatch	·	2.7 km	MPC · JPL
292670	2006 UA_{75}	—	October 17, 2006	Kitt Peak	Spacewatch	·	1.6 km	MPC · JPL
292671	2006 UK_{75}	—	October 17, 2006	Mount Lemmon	Mount Lemmon Survey	EOS	1.8 km	MPC · JPL
292672	2006 UT_{76}	—	October 17, 2006	Kitt Peak	Spacewatch	WIT	960 m	MPC · JPL
292673	2006 UK_{78}	—	October 17, 2006	Kitt Peak	Spacewatch	·	3.6 km	MPC · JPL
292674	2006 UM_{79}	—	October 17, 2006	Kitt Peak	Spacewatch	·	1.4 km	MPC · JPL
292675	2006 UB_{81}	—	October 17, 2006	Kitt Peak	Spacewatch	·	2.9 km	MPC · JPL
292676	2006 UK_{83}	—	October 17, 2006	Mount Lemmon	Mount Lemmon Survey	·	790 m	MPC · JPL
292677	2006 US_{83}	—	October 17, 2006	Kitt Peak	Spacewatch	·	1.5 km	MPC · JPL
292678	2006 UF_{84}	—	October 17, 2006	Mount Lemmon	Mount Lemmon Survey	KOR	1.3 km	MPC · JPL
292679	2006 UR_{84}	—	October 17, 2006	Kitt Peak	Spacewatch	·	2.9 km	MPC · JPL
292680	2006 UR_{89}	—	October 17, 2006	Kitt Peak	Spacewatch	(5)	1.5 km	MPC · JPL
292681	2006 UO_{90}	—	October 17, 2006	Kitt Peak	Spacewatch	·	1.0 km	MPC · JPL
292682	2006 UN_{92}	—	October 18, 2006	Kitt Peak	Spacewatch	·	3.4 km	MPC · JPL
292683	2006 UB_{93}	—	October 18, 2006	Kitt Peak	Spacewatch	·	3.5 km	MPC · JPL
292684	2006 UW_{93}	—	October 18, 2006	Kitt Peak	Spacewatch	·	1.6 km	MPC · JPL
292685	2006 UL_{94}	—	October 18, 2006	Kitt Peak	Spacewatch	·	1.5 km	MPC · JPL
292686	2006 UV_{96}	—	October 18, 2006	Kitt Peak	Spacewatch	·	1.8 km	MPC · JPL
292687	2006 UG_{97}	—	October 18, 2006	Kitt Peak	Spacewatch	·	1.7 km	MPC · JPL
292688	2006 UM_{97}	—	October 18, 2006	Kitt Peak	Spacewatch	(11882)	1.6 km	MPC · JPL
292689	2006 UB_{98}	—	October 18, 2006	Kitt Peak	Spacewatch	MIS	2.8 km	MPC · JPL
292690	2006 UO_{98}	—	October 18, 2006	Kitt Peak	Spacewatch	(5)	1.4 km	MPC · JPL
292691	2006 UB_{99}	—	October 18, 2006	Kitt Peak	Spacewatch	·	3.9 km	MPC · JPL
292692	2006 UL_{99}	—	October 18, 2006	Kitt Peak	Spacewatch	·	1.6 km	MPC · JPL
292693	2006 UZ_{110}	—	October 19, 2006	Kitt Peak	Spacewatch	·	1.3 km	MPC · JPL
292694	2006 UB_{111}	—	October 19, 2006	Kitt Peak	Spacewatch	(5)	1.7 km	MPC · JPL
292695	2006 UZ_{113}	—	October 19, 2006	Kitt Peak	Spacewatch	·	1.9 km	MPC · JPL
292696	2006 UD_{117}	—	October 19, 2006	Kitt Peak	Spacewatch	·	2.1 km	MPC · JPL
292697	2006 UW_{117}	—	October 19, 2006	Kitt Peak	Spacewatch	·	970 m	MPC · JPL
292698	2006 UE_{121}	—	October 19, 2006	Kitt Peak	Spacewatch	·	2.1 km	MPC · JPL
292699	2006 UF_{121}	—	October 19, 2006	Kitt Peak	Spacewatch	·	1.7 km	MPC · JPL
292700	2006 UV_{121}	—	October 19, 2006	Kitt Peak	Spacewatch	DOR	3.0 km	MPC · JPL

== 292701–292800 ==
back to top

Designation			Discovery			Properties		Ref
Permanent	Provisional	Named after	Date	Site	Discoverer(s)	Category	Diam.	Ref
292701	2006 UZ_{121}	—	October 19, 2006	Kitt Peak	Spacewatch	KON	2.7 km	MPC · JPL
292702	2006 UK_{122}	—	October 19, 2006	Kitt Peak	Spacewatch	·	1.2 km	MPC · JPL
292703	2006 UE_{123}	—	October 19, 2006	Kitt Peak	Spacewatch	(5)	1.0 km	MPC · JPL
292704	2006 UW_{123}	—	October 19, 2006	Kitt Peak	Spacewatch	·	800 m	MPC · JPL
292705	2006 US_{124}	—	October 19, 2006	Mount Lemmon	Mount Lemmon Survey	·	990 m	MPC · JPL
292706	2006 UU_{124}	—	October 19, 2006	Mount Lemmon	Mount Lemmon Survey	·	4.4 km	MPC · JPL
292707	2006 UJ_{126}	—	October 19, 2006	Kitt Peak	Spacewatch	·	2.9 km	MPC · JPL
292708	2006 UC_{127}	—	October 19, 2006	Kitt Peak	Spacewatch	·	2.2 km	MPC · JPL
292709	2006 UM_{127}	—	October 19, 2006	Kitt Peak	Spacewatch	·	1.3 km	MPC · JPL
292710	2006 US_{127}	—	October 19, 2006	Catalina	CSS	EUN	1.4 km	MPC · JPL
292711	2006 UD_{128}	—	October 19, 2006	Kitt Peak	Spacewatch	·	1.2 km	MPC · JPL
292712	2006 UJ_{128}	—	October 19, 2006	Kitt Peak	Spacewatch	MAS	620 m	MPC · JPL
292713	2006 UD_{130}	—	October 19, 2006	Kitt Peak	Spacewatch	·	1.7 km	MPC · JPL
292714	2006 UU_{130}	—	October 19, 2006	Kitt Peak	Spacewatch	·	4.0 km	MPC · JPL
292715	2006 UJ_{132}	—	October 19, 2006	Catalina	CSS	·	880 m	MPC · JPL
292716	2006 UU_{133}	—	October 19, 2006	Kitt Peak	Spacewatch	·	3.6 km	MPC · JPL
292717	2006 UC_{135}	—	October 19, 2006	Kitt Peak	Spacewatch	MAS	650 m	MPC · JPL
292718	2006 UP_{136}	—	October 19, 2006	Mount Lemmon	Mount Lemmon Survey	·	4.2 km	MPC · JPL
292719	2006 UH_{137}	—	October 19, 2006	Mount Lemmon	Mount Lemmon Survey	·	1.7 km	MPC · JPL
292720	2006 UK_{138}	—	October 19, 2006	Kitt Peak	Spacewatch	ADE	3.7 km	MPC · JPL
292721	2006 UL_{138}	—	October 19, 2006	Kitt Peak	Spacewatch	·	1.9 km	MPC · JPL
292722	2006 UK_{139}	—	October 19, 2006	Kitt Peak	Spacewatch	EUN	1.9 km	MPC · JPL
292723	2006 UP_{140}	—	October 19, 2006	Kitt Peak	Spacewatch	·	1.5 km	MPC · JPL
292724	2006 UX_{140}	—	October 19, 2006	Kitt Peak	Spacewatch	V	630 m	MPC · JPL
292725	2006 UH_{141}	—	October 19, 2006	Mount Lemmon	Mount Lemmon Survey	·	3.3 km	MPC · JPL
292726	2006 UY_{141}	—	October 19, 2006	Kitt Peak	Spacewatch	HYG	3.7 km	MPC · JPL
292727	2006 UV_{142}	—	October 19, 2006	Kitt Peak	Spacewatch	MRX	1.1 km	MPC · JPL
292728	2006 US_{143}	—	October 19, 2006	Kitt Peak	Spacewatch	·	1.5 km	MPC · JPL
292729	2006 UU_{143}	—	October 19, 2006	Palomar	NEAT	DOR	3.8 km	MPC · JPL
292730	2006 US_{153}	—	October 21, 2006	Kitt Peak	Spacewatch	V	770 m	MPC · JPL
292731	2006 UH_{155}	—	October 21, 2006	Catalina	CSS	·	2.1 km	MPC · JPL
292732	2006 UY_{155}	—	October 21, 2006	Mount Lemmon	Mount Lemmon Survey	BRA	1.9 km	MPC · JPL
292733	2006 UG_{156}	—	October 21, 2006	Mount Lemmon	Mount Lemmon Survey	EOS	2.2 km	MPC · JPL
292734	2006 UM_{157}	—	October 21, 2006	Mount Lemmon	Mount Lemmon Survey	·	2.3 km	MPC · JPL
292735	2006 UO_{162}	—	October 21, 2006	Mount Lemmon	Mount Lemmon Survey	NAE	2.3 km	MPC · JPL
292736	2006 UL_{164}	—	October 21, 2006	Mount Lemmon	Mount Lemmon Survey	·	1.8 km	MPC · JPL
292737	2006 UG_{167}	—	October 21, 2006	Mount Lemmon	Mount Lemmon Survey	·	4.8 km	MPC · JPL
292738	2006 UM_{171}	—	October 21, 2006	Mount Lemmon	Mount Lemmon Survey	MRX	1.2 km	MPC · JPL
292739	2006 UR_{171}	—	October 21, 2006	Mount Lemmon	Mount Lemmon Survey	·	1.6 km	MPC · JPL
292740	2006 UV_{171}	—	October 21, 2006	Mount Lemmon	Mount Lemmon Survey	·	1.5 km	MPC · JPL
292741	2006 UH_{172}	—	October 21, 2006	Mount Lemmon	Mount Lemmon Survey	·	3.6 km	MPC · JPL
292742	2006 UV_{172}	—	October 22, 2006	Kitt Peak	Spacewatch	·	1.5 km	MPC · JPL
292743	2006 UO_{173}	—	October 22, 2006	Mount Lemmon	Mount Lemmon Survey	·	1.3 km	MPC · JPL
292744	2006 UP_{173}	—	October 22, 2006	Mount Lemmon	Mount Lemmon Survey	·	1.7 km	MPC · JPL
292745	2006 UN_{174}	—	October 19, 2006	Catalina	CSS	MRX	1.3 km	MPC · JPL
292746	2006 UU_{174}	—	October 16, 2006	Bergisch Gladbach	W. Bickel	(11882)	2.0 km	MPC · JPL
292747	2006 UD_{175}	—	October 16, 2006	Catalina	CSS	·	2.6 km	MPC · JPL
292748	2006 UG_{176}	—	October 16, 2006	Catalina	CSS	·	4.3 km	MPC · JPL
292749	2006 UX_{176}	—	October 16, 2006	Catalina	CSS	·	1.5 km	MPC · JPL
292750	2006 UT_{177}	—	October 16, 2006	Catalina	CSS	HYG	3.7 km	MPC · JPL
292751	2006 UE_{178}	—	October 16, 2006	Catalina	CSS	NAE	3.3 km	MPC · JPL
292752	2006 UH_{179}	—	October 16, 2006	Catalina	CSS	·	2.0 km	MPC · JPL
292753	2006 UJ_{183}	—	October 17, 2006	Catalina	CSS	·	3.1 km	MPC · JPL
292754	2006 UH_{184}	—	October 19, 2006	Palomar	NEAT	·	1.2 km	MPC · JPL
292755	2006 UU_{185}	—	October 17, 2006	Catalina	CSS	·	4.8 km	MPC · JPL
292756	2006 UV_{185}	—	October 17, 2006	Catalina	CSS	·	4.0 km	MPC · JPL
292757	2006 UX_{185}	—	October 17, 2006	Catalina	CSS	EOS	2.8 km	MPC · JPL
292758	2006 UH_{186}	—	October 17, 2006	Catalina	CSS	EMA	4.9 km	MPC · JPL
292759	2006 UO_{186}	—	October 17, 2006	Catalina	CSS	·	5.0 km	MPC · JPL
292760	2006 UQ_{186}	—	October 17, 2006	Kitt Peak	Spacewatch	·	1.1 km	MPC · JPL
292761	2006 UB_{188}	—	October 19, 2006	Catalina	CSS	·	2.8 km	MPC · JPL
292762	2006 UO_{191}	—	October 19, 2006	Catalina	CSS	·	1.8 km	MPC · JPL
292763	2006 UC_{192}	—	October 19, 2006	Catalina	CSS	·	2.7 km	MPC · JPL
292764	2006 UE_{192}	—	October 19, 2006	Catalina	CSS	·	2.4 km	MPC · JPL
292765	2006 UR_{192}	—	October 19, 2006	Catalina	CSS	EOS	2.7 km	MPC · JPL
292766	2006 UX_{193}	—	October 20, 2006	Kitt Peak	Spacewatch	·	4.9 km	MPC · JPL
292767	2006 UL_{199}	—	October 20, 2006	Kitt Peak	Spacewatch	·	5.3 km	MPC · JPL
292768	2006 UQ_{199}	—	October 21, 2006	Catalina	CSS	·	3.6 km	MPC · JPL
292769	2006 UA_{201}	—	October 21, 2006	Kitt Peak	Spacewatch	·	3.4 km	MPC · JPL
292770	2006 UU_{203}	—	October 22, 2006	Palomar	NEAT	·	3.3 km	MPC · JPL
292771	2006 UL_{204}	—	October 22, 2006	Kitt Peak	Spacewatch	·	4.4 km	MPC · JPL
292772	2006 UR_{204}	—	October 22, 2006	Palomar	NEAT	·	2.4 km	MPC · JPL
292773	2006 UH_{205}	—	October 23, 2006	Kitt Peak	Spacewatch	·	780 m	MPC · JPL
292774	2006 UA_{209}	—	October 23, 2006	Kitt Peak	Spacewatch	(883)	750 m	MPC · JPL
292775	2006 UB_{211}	—	October 23, 2006	Kitt Peak	Spacewatch	·	2.4 km	MPC · JPL
292776	2006 UM_{211}	—	October 23, 2006	Kitt Peak	Spacewatch	·	3.5 km	MPC · JPL
292777	2006 UE_{213}	—	October 23, 2006	Kitt Peak	Spacewatch	HOF	2.8 km	MPC · JPL
292778	2006 UB_{214}	—	October 23, 2006	Kitt Peak	Spacewatch	·	1.7 km	MPC · JPL
292779	2006 UB_{215}	—	October 26, 2006	Kitami	K. Endate	·	4.0 km	MPC · JPL
292780	2006 UH_{215}	—	October 27, 2006	Calvin-Rehoboth	L. A. Molnar	·	1.3 km	MPC · JPL
292781	2006 UU_{215}	—	October 27, 2006	Mount Lemmon	Mount Lemmon Survey	·	1.8 km	MPC · JPL
292782	2006 US_{218}	—	October 16, 2006	Kitt Peak	Spacewatch	·	3.8 km	MPC · JPL
292783	2006 UU_{218}	—	October 16, 2006	Catalina	CSS	·	810 m	MPC · JPL
292784	2006 UM_{219}	—	October 16, 2006	Kitt Peak	Spacewatch	·	1.3 km	MPC · JPL
292785	2006 UO_{220}	—	October 17, 2006	Kitt Peak	Spacewatch	EOS	2.9 km	MPC · JPL
292786	2006 UE_{222}	—	October 17, 2006	Catalina	CSS	·	1.3 km	MPC · JPL
292787	2006 UM_{222}	—	October 17, 2006	Catalina	CSS	HYG	4.4 km	MPC · JPL
292788	2006 UE_{223}	—	October 17, 2006	Catalina	CSS	·	3.0 km	MPC · JPL
292789	2006 UJ_{223}	—	October 17, 2006	Catalina	CSS	VER	4.1 km	MPC · JPL
292790	2006 UF_{224}	—	October 19, 2006	Palomar	NEAT	·	1.2 km	MPC · JPL
292791	2006 UH_{225}	—	October 19, 2006	Catalina	CSS	EOS	2.5 km	MPC · JPL
292792	2006 UK_{225}	—	October 19, 2006	Kitt Peak	Spacewatch	·	3.7 km	MPC · JPL
292793	2006 UC_{226}	—	October 20, 2006	Kitt Peak	Spacewatch	·	840 m	MPC · JPL
292794	2006 UF_{228}	—	October 20, 2006	Kitt Peak	Spacewatch	·	3.3 km	MPC · JPL
292795	2006 UO_{228}	—	October 20, 2006	Palomar	NEAT	·	1.7 km	MPC · JPL
292796	2006 UV_{228}	—	October 20, 2006	Palomar	NEAT	·	1.6 km	MPC · JPL
292797	2006 UX_{232}	—	October 21, 2006	Palomar	NEAT	·	3.4 km	MPC · JPL
292798	2006 US_{233}	—	October 22, 2006	Mount Lemmon	Mount Lemmon Survey	·	2.4 km	MPC · JPL
292799	2006 UE_{234}	—	October 22, 2006	Kitt Peak	Spacewatch	·	3.5 km	MPC · JPL
292800	2006 UJ_{237}	—	October 23, 2006	Kitt Peak	Spacewatch	·	1.5 km	MPC · JPL

== 292801–292900 ==
back to top

Designation			Discovery			Properties		Ref
Permanent	Provisional	Named after	Date	Site	Discoverer(s)	Category	Diam.	Ref
292801	2006 UA_{241}	—	October 23, 2006	Mount Lemmon	Mount Lemmon Survey	·	4.2 km	MPC · JPL
292802	2006 UK_{242}	—	October 27, 2006	Kitt Peak	Spacewatch	·	5.1 km	MPC · JPL
292803	2006 UE_{243}	—	October 27, 2006	Mount Lemmon	Mount Lemmon Survey	·	3.3 km	MPC · JPL
292804	2006 UO_{243}	—	October 27, 2006	Mount Lemmon	Mount Lemmon Survey	·	1.9 km	MPC · JPL
292805	2006 US_{244}	—	October 27, 2006	Mount Lemmon	Mount Lemmon Survey	·	2.4 km	MPC · JPL
292806	2006 US_{246}	—	October 27, 2006	Mount Lemmon	Mount Lemmon Survey	·	2.0 km	MPC · JPL
292807	2006 UK_{248}	—	October 27, 2006	Mount Lemmon	Mount Lemmon Survey	·	2.8 km	MPC · JPL
292808	2006 UX_{248}	—	October 27, 2006	Mount Lemmon	Mount Lemmon Survey	NYS	1.4 km	MPC · JPL
292809	2006 UK_{250}	—	October 27, 2006	Mount Lemmon	Mount Lemmon Survey	·	3.7 km	MPC · JPL
292810	2006 UA_{251}	—	October 27, 2006	Mount Lemmon	Mount Lemmon Survey	·	1.3 km	MPC · JPL
292811	2006 UY_{252}	—	October 27, 2006	Mount Lemmon	Mount Lemmon Survey	·	2.4 km	MPC · JPL
292812	2006 UJ_{253}	—	October 27, 2006	Mount Lemmon	Mount Lemmon Survey	·	3.5 km	MPC · JPL
292813	2006 UP_{254}	—	October 27, 2006	Mount Lemmon	Mount Lemmon Survey	·	3.1 km	MPC · JPL
292814	2006 UT_{254}	—	October 27, 2006	Mount Lemmon	Mount Lemmon Survey	·	3.2 km	MPC · JPL
292815	2006 UX_{254}	—	October 27, 2006	Mount Lemmon	Mount Lemmon Survey	·	760 m	MPC · JPL
292816	2006 UZ_{254}	—	October 27, 2006	Mount Lemmon	Mount Lemmon Survey	·	1.3 km	MPC · JPL
292817	2006 UH_{255}	—	October 27, 2006	Mount Lemmon	Mount Lemmon Survey	·	1.7 km	MPC · JPL
292818	2006 UR_{257}	—	October 28, 2006	Mount Lemmon	Mount Lemmon Survey	·	1.6 km	MPC · JPL
292819	2006 UG_{261}	—	October 28, 2006	Catalina	CSS	·	1.1 km	MPC · JPL
292820	2006 UF_{262}	—	October 28, 2006	Mount Lemmon	Mount Lemmon Survey	NYS	1.5 km	MPC · JPL
292821	2006 UC_{265}	—	October 27, 2006	Mount Lemmon	Mount Lemmon Survey	MAS	680 m	MPC · JPL
292822	2006 UU_{266}	—	October 27, 2006	Kitt Peak	Spacewatch	NEM	2.6 km	MPC · JPL
292823	2006 UQ_{269}	—	October 27, 2006	Kitt Peak	Spacewatch	·	5.2 km	MPC · JPL
292824	2006 UV_{270}	—	October 27, 2006	Mount Lemmon	Mount Lemmon Survey	·	2.3 km	MPC · JPL
292825	2006 UM_{271}	—	October 27, 2006	Mount Lemmon	Mount Lemmon Survey	·	2.8 km	MPC · JPL
292826	2006 UW_{272}	—	October 27, 2006	Kitt Peak	Spacewatch	EMA	4.4 km	MPC · JPL
292827	2006 UZ_{272}	—	October 27, 2006	Kitt Peak	Spacewatch	·	1.3 km	MPC · JPL
292828	2006 UG_{273}	—	October 27, 2006	Kitt Peak	Spacewatch	·	4.1 km	MPC · JPL
292829	2006 UB_{274}	—	October 27, 2006	Kitt Peak	Spacewatch	·	2.1 km	MPC · JPL
292830	2006 UH_{275}	—	October 28, 2006	Kitt Peak	Spacewatch	·	3.4 km	MPC · JPL
292831	2006 UA_{276}	—	October 28, 2006	Kitt Peak	Spacewatch	KOR	1.7 km	MPC · JPL
292832	2006 UH_{281}	—	October 28, 2006	Mount Lemmon	Mount Lemmon Survey	·	1.0 km	MPC · JPL
292833	2006 UP_{281}	—	October 28, 2006	Mount Lemmon	Mount Lemmon Survey	·	1.4 km	MPC · JPL
292834	2006 UV_{281}	—	October 28, 2006	Mount Lemmon	Mount Lemmon Survey	·	1.6 km	MPC · JPL
292835	2006 UW_{282}	—	October 28, 2006	Kitt Peak	Spacewatch	NYS	1.2 km	MPC · JPL
292836	2006 UG_{283}	—	October 28, 2006	Kitt Peak	Spacewatch	·	1.4 km	MPC · JPL
292837	2006 UH_{283}	—	October 28, 2006	Kitt Peak	Spacewatch	·	2.6 km	MPC · JPL
292838	2006 UN_{284}	—	October 28, 2006	Kitt Peak	Spacewatch	·	4.8 km	MPC · JPL
292839	2006 UH_{285}	—	October 28, 2006	Mount Lemmon	Mount Lemmon Survey	·	2.9 km	MPC · JPL
292840	2006 UB_{289}	—	October 31, 2006	Kitt Peak	Spacewatch	·	1.4 km	MPC · JPL
292841	2006 UA_{290}	—	October 31, 2006	Kitt Peak	Spacewatch	·	2.0 km	MPC · JPL
292842	2006 UD_{295}	—	October 19, 2006	Kitt Peak	M. W. Buie	AGN	1.5 km	MPC · JPL
292843	2006 UC_{299}	—	October 19, 2006	Kitt Peak	M. W. Buie	·	2.6 km	MPC · JPL
292844	2006 UY_{300}	—	October 19, 2006	Kitt Peak	M. W. Buie	·	1.9 km	MPC · JPL
292845	2006 UX_{325}	—	October 20, 2006	Kitt Peak	M. W. Buie	WIT	940 m	MPC · JPL
292846	2006 UP_{327}	—	October 28, 2006	Mount Lemmon	Mount Lemmon Survey	·	2.3 km	MPC · JPL
292847	2006 UP_{328}	—	October 19, 2006	Kitt Peak	Spacewatch	·	810 m	MPC · JPL
292848	2006 UZ_{328}	—	October 21, 2006	Mount Lemmon	Mount Lemmon Survey	NEM	2.5 km	MPC · JPL
292849	2006 UG_{329}	—	October 22, 2006	Kitt Peak	Spacewatch	·	4.7 km	MPC · JPL
292850	2006 UZ_{329}	—	October 22, 2006	Mount Lemmon	Mount Lemmon Survey	·	980 m	MPC · JPL
292851	2006 UL_{332}	—	October 21, 2006	Apache Point	A. C. Becker	·	2.8 km	MPC · JPL
292852	2006 US_{334}	—	October 20, 2006	Mount Lemmon	Mount Lemmon Survey	·	1.4 km	MPC · JPL
292853	2006 UY_{334}	—	October 21, 2006	Kitt Peak	Spacewatch	·	1.2 km	MPC · JPL
292854	2006 UN_{338}	—	October 28, 2006	Mount Lemmon	Mount Lemmon Survey	·	3.6 km	MPC · JPL
292855	2006 UQ_{338}	—	October 31, 2006	Mount Lemmon	Mount Lemmon Survey	MAS	990 m	MPC · JPL
292856 Peeters	2006 UE_{341}	Peeters	October 26, 2006	Mauna Kea	P. A. Wiegert	·	1.6 km	MPC · JPL
292857	2006 US_{358}	—	October 18, 2006	Kitt Peak	Spacewatch	·	2.7 km	MPC · JPL
292858	2006 UW_{360}	—	October 23, 2006	Mount Lemmon	Mount Lemmon Survey	·	3.1 km	MPC · JPL
292859	2006 UK_{361}	—	October 22, 2006	Catalina	CSS	·	1.6 km	MPC · JPL
292860	2006 VW	—	November 1, 2006	Mount Lemmon	Mount Lemmon Survey	·	1.3 km	MPC · JPL
292861	2006 VZ	—	November 1, 2006	Kitt Peak	Spacewatch	·	2.4 km	MPC · JPL
292862	2006 VM_{1}	—	November 1, 2006	Mount Lemmon	Mount Lemmon Survey	·	1.4 km	MPC · JPL
292863	2006 VQ_{2}	—	November 3, 2006	Charleston	Astronomical Research Observatory	·	4.3 km	MPC · JPL
292864	2006 VJ_{3}	—	November 9, 2006	Kitt Peak	Spacewatch	·	1.0 km	MPC · JPL
292865	2006 VR_{3}	—	November 9, 2006	Kitt Peak	Spacewatch	·	5.0 km	MPC · JPL
292866	2006 VY_{3}	—	November 9, 2006	Kitt Peak	Spacewatch	·	1.7 km	MPC · JPL
292867	2006 VU_{4}	—	November 9, 2006	Lulin	Lin, H.-C., Q. Ye	·	4.4 km	MPC · JPL
292868	2006 VA_{6}	—	November 10, 2006	Kitt Peak	Spacewatch	AGN	1.6 km	MPC · JPL
292869	2006 VB_{6}	—	November 10, 2006	Kitt Peak	Spacewatch	·	1.2 km	MPC · JPL
292870	2006 VF_{8}	—	November 11, 2006	Kitt Peak	Spacewatch	·	1.5 km	MPC · JPL
292871	2006 VC_{12}	—	November 11, 2006	Mount Lemmon	Mount Lemmon Survey	·	1.2 km	MPC · JPL
292872 Anoushankar	2006 VV_{12}	Anoushankar	November 12, 2006	Vallemare Borbona	V. S. Casulli	EOS	2.6 km	MPC · JPL
292873	2006 VV_{14}	—	November 9, 2006	Kitt Peak	Spacewatch	·	950 m	MPC · JPL
292874	2006 VE_{15}	—	November 9, 2006	Kitt Peak	Spacewatch	·	3.5 km	MPC · JPL
292875	2006 VD_{16}	—	November 9, 2006	Kitt Peak	Spacewatch	MRX	1.3 km	MPC · JPL
292876	2006 VH_{18}	—	November 9, 2006	Kitt Peak	Spacewatch	·	880 m	MPC · JPL
292877	2006 VZ_{18}	—	November 9, 2006	Kitt Peak	Spacewatch	·	710 m	MPC · JPL
292878	2006 VY_{19}	—	November 9, 2006	Kitt Peak	Spacewatch	V	750 m	MPC · JPL
292879	2006 VG_{20}	—	November 9, 2006	Kitt Peak	Spacewatch	·	1.0 km	MPC · JPL
292880	2006 VB_{21}	—	November 9, 2006	Lulin	Lin, H.-C., Q. Ye	EOS	3.1 km	MPC · JPL
292881	2006 VX_{23}	—	November 10, 2006	Kitt Peak	Spacewatch	·	1.6 km	MPC · JPL
292882	2006 VN_{24}	—	November 10, 2006	Kitt Peak	Spacewatch	·	2.2 km	MPC · JPL
292883	2006 VS_{24}	—	November 10, 2006	Kitt Peak	Spacewatch	·	2.8 km	MPC · JPL
292884	2006 VZ_{25}	—	November 10, 2006	Kitt Peak	Spacewatch	MRX	1.3 km	MPC · JPL
292885	2006 VT_{27}	—	November 10, 2006	Kitt Peak	Spacewatch	·	3.6 km	MPC · JPL
292886	2006 VV_{27}	—	November 10, 2006	Kitt Peak	Spacewatch	KOR	1.5 km	MPC · JPL
292887	2006 VU_{29}	—	November 10, 2006	Kitt Peak	Spacewatch	EOS	2.7 km	MPC · JPL
292888	2006 VU_{30}	—	November 10, 2006	Kitt Peak	Spacewatch	·	5.2 km	MPC · JPL
292889	2006 VK_{31}	—	November 11, 2006	Kitt Peak	Spacewatch	VER	4.0 km	MPC · JPL
292890	2006 VG_{33}	—	November 11, 2006	Mount Lemmon	Mount Lemmon Survey	THM	2.9 km	MPC · JPL
292891	2006 VQ_{34}	—	November 11, 2006	Catalina	CSS	·	2.8 km	MPC · JPL
292892	2006 VH_{35}	—	November 11, 2006	Mount Lemmon	Mount Lemmon Survey	·	740 m	MPC · JPL
292893	2006 VT_{36}	—	November 11, 2006	Catalina	CSS	NYS	1.4 km	MPC · JPL
292894	2006 VN_{38}	—	November 12, 2006	Mount Lemmon	Mount Lemmon Survey	·	750 m	MPC · JPL
292895	2006 VQ_{38}	—	November 12, 2006	Mount Lemmon	Mount Lemmon Survey	·	1.2 km	MPC · JPL
292896	2006 VJ_{40}	—	November 12, 2006	Mount Lemmon	Mount Lemmon Survey	·	1.4 km	MPC · JPL
292897	2006 VF_{41}	—	November 12, 2006	Mount Lemmon	Mount Lemmon Survey	·	1.9 km	MPC · JPL
292898	2006 VH_{41}	—	November 12, 2006	Mount Lemmon	Mount Lemmon Survey	MIS	2.4 km	MPC · JPL
292899	2006 VQ_{41}	—	November 12, 2006	Mount Lemmon	Mount Lemmon Survey	MAS	650 m	MPC · JPL
292900	2006 VU_{41}	—	November 12, 2006	Mount Lemmon	Mount Lemmon Survey	MAS	650 m	MPC · JPL

== 292901–293000 ==
back to top

Designation			Discovery			Properties		Ref
Permanent	Provisional	Named after	Date	Site	Discoverer(s)	Category	Diam.	Ref
292901	2006 VE_{42}	—	November 12, 2006	Mount Lemmon	Mount Lemmon Survey	·	1.5 km	MPC · JPL
292902	2006 VN_{43}	—	November 13, 2006	Catalina	CSS	·	3.8 km	MPC · JPL
292903	2006 VH_{44}	—	November 13, 2006	Catalina	CSS	H	620 m	MPC · JPL
292904	2006 VH_{46}	—	November 9, 2006	Kitt Peak	Spacewatch	·	1.7 km	MPC · JPL
292905	2006 VP_{48}	—	November 10, 2006	Socorro	LINEAR	·	2.9 km	MPC · JPL
292906	2006 VG_{49}	—	November 10, 2006	Kitt Peak	Spacewatch	·	3.7 km	MPC · JPL
292907	2006 VD_{50}	—	November 10, 2006	Kitt Peak	Spacewatch	·	1.2 km	MPC · JPL
292908	2006 VM_{51}	—	November 10, 2006	Kitt Peak	Spacewatch	·	1.8 km	MPC · JPL
292909	2006 VX_{51}	—	November 11, 2006	Kitt Peak	Spacewatch	·	1.7 km	MPC · JPL
292910	2006 VV_{53}	—	November 11, 2006	Kitt Peak	Spacewatch	·	2.2 km	MPC · JPL
292911	2006 VB_{55}	—	November 11, 2006	Kitt Peak	Spacewatch	·	2.7 km	MPC · JPL
292912	2006 VJ_{56}	—	November 11, 2006	Kitt Peak	Spacewatch	·	2.7 km	MPC · JPL
292913	2006 VM_{56}	—	November 11, 2006	Kitt Peak	Spacewatch	V	800 m	MPC · JPL
292914	2006 VS_{56}	—	November 11, 2006	Kitt Peak	Spacewatch	·	1.6 km	MPC · JPL
292915	2006 VP_{60}	—	November 11, 2006	Mount Lemmon	Mount Lemmon Survey	MAS	730 m	MPC · JPL
292916	2006 VS_{61}	—	November 11, 2006	Kitt Peak	Spacewatch	·	1.1 km	MPC · JPL
292917	2006 VD_{62}	—	November 11, 2006	Kitt Peak	Spacewatch	·	2.0 km	MPC · JPL
292918	2006 VQ_{62}	—	November 11, 2006	Kitt Peak	Spacewatch	·	2.0 km	MPC · JPL
292919	2006 VV_{62}	—	November 11, 2006	Kitt Peak	Spacewatch	·	3.9 km	MPC · JPL
292920	2006 VB_{63}	—	November 11, 2006	Kitt Peak	Spacewatch	NEM	1.9 km	MPC · JPL
292921	2006 VK_{63}	—	November 11, 2006	Kitt Peak	Spacewatch	·	1.9 km	MPC · JPL
292922	2006 VA_{65}	—	November 11, 2006	Kitt Peak	Spacewatch	KOR	1.7 km	MPC · JPL
292923	2006 VG_{65}	—	November 11, 2006	Kitt Peak	Spacewatch	·	660 m	MPC · JPL
292924	2006 VN_{65}	—	November 11, 2006	Kitt Peak	Spacewatch	·	2.7 km	MPC · JPL
292925	2006 VP_{66}	—	November 11, 2006	Catalina	CSS	·	1.3 km	MPC · JPL
292926	2006 VR_{66}	—	November 11, 2006	Catalina	CSS	·	2.2 km	MPC · JPL
292927	2006 VU_{66}	—	November 11, 2006	Catalina	CSS	·	2.8 km	MPC · JPL
292928	2006 VH_{69}	—	November 11, 2006	Kitt Peak	Spacewatch	KOR	1.7 km	MPC · JPL
292929	2006 VO_{69}	—	November 11, 2006	Kitt Peak	Spacewatch	·	3.7 km	MPC · JPL
292930	2006 VX_{69}	—	November 11, 2006	Kitt Peak	Spacewatch	NYS	1.3 km	MPC · JPL
292931	2006 VC_{71}	—	November 11, 2006	Mount Lemmon	Mount Lemmon Survey	·	2.0 km	MPC · JPL
292932	2006 VZ_{72}	—	November 11, 2006	Mount Lemmon	Mount Lemmon Survey	·	3.2 km	MPC · JPL
292933	2006 VG_{73}	—	November 11, 2006	Kitt Peak	Spacewatch	·	1.4 km	MPC · JPL
292934	2006 VA_{74}	—	November 11, 2006	Mount Lemmon	Mount Lemmon Survey	·	3.0 km	MPC · JPL
292935	2006 VK_{76}	—	November 12, 2006	Mount Lemmon	Mount Lemmon Survey	·	2.6 km	MPC · JPL
292936	2006 VQ_{76}	—	November 12, 2006	Mount Lemmon	Mount Lemmon Survey	·	2.0 km	MPC · JPL
292937	2006 VS_{78}	—	November 12, 2006	Mount Lemmon	Mount Lemmon Survey	NEM	2.3 km	MPC · JPL
292938	2006 VW_{78}	—	November 12, 2006	Mount Lemmon	Mount Lemmon Survey	·	4.4 km	MPC · JPL
292939	2006 VS_{79}	—	November 12, 2006	Mount Lemmon	Mount Lemmon Survey	·	3.7 km	MPC · JPL
292940	2006 VY_{83}	—	November 13, 2006	Mount Lemmon	Mount Lemmon Survey	·	4.0 km	MPC · JPL
292941	2006 VA_{84}	—	November 13, 2006	Mount Lemmon	Mount Lemmon Survey	·	2.2 km	MPC · JPL
292942	2006 VE_{86}	—	November 14, 2006	Kitt Peak	Spacewatch	·	710 m	MPC · JPL
292943	2006 VJ_{89}	—	November 14, 2006	Kitt Peak	Spacewatch	·	2.3 km	MPC · JPL
292944	2006 VS_{93}	—	November 15, 2006	Mount Lemmon	Mount Lemmon Survey	(7744)	1.9 km	MPC · JPL
292945	2006 VB_{94}	—	November 15, 2006	Mount Lemmon	Mount Lemmon Survey	·	2.1 km	MPC · JPL
292946	2006 VO_{96}	—	November 10, 2006	Kitt Peak	Spacewatch	·	1.9 km	MPC · JPL
292947	2006 VL_{97}	—	November 11, 2006	Kitt Peak	Spacewatch	·	2.2 km	MPC · JPL
292948	2006 VR_{99}	—	November 11, 2006	Catalina	CSS	·	690 m	MPC · JPL
292949	2006 VC_{100}	—	November 11, 2006	Catalina	CSS	BRA	1.8 km	MPC · JPL
292950	2006 VK_{103}	—	November 12, 2006	Lulin	Lin, H.-C., Q. Ye	·	3.2 km	MPC · JPL
292951	2006 VB_{105}	—	November 13, 2006	Kitt Peak	Spacewatch	·	5.1 km	MPC · JPL
292952	2006 VM_{108}	—	November 13, 2006	Kitt Peak	Spacewatch	·	3.0 km	MPC · JPL
292953	2006 VX_{108}	—	November 13, 2006	Palomar	NEAT	·	3.0 km	MPC · JPL
292954	2006 VN_{110}	—	November 13, 2006	Kitt Peak	Spacewatch	·	1.6 km	MPC · JPL
292955	2006 VC_{111}	—	November 13, 2006	Kitt Peak	Spacewatch	HYG	2.9 km	MPC · JPL
292956	2006 VF_{111}	—	November 13, 2006	Kitt Peak	Spacewatch	·	2.1 km	MPC · JPL
292957	2006 VO_{111}	—	November 13, 2006	Kitt Peak	Spacewatch	·	2.6 km	MPC · JPL
292958	2006 VY_{112}	—	November 13, 2006	Kitt Peak	Spacewatch	fast	3.2 km	MPC · JPL
292959	2006 VC_{113}	—	November 13, 2006	Kitt Peak	Spacewatch	PAD	2.7 km	MPC · JPL
292960	2006 VN_{113}	—	November 13, 2006	Mount Lemmon	Mount Lemmon Survey	·	1.1 km	MPC · JPL
292961	2006 VV_{114}	—	November 14, 2006	Mount Lemmon	Mount Lemmon Survey	·	2.6 km	MPC · JPL
292962	2006 VX_{120}	—	November 14, 2006	Kitt Peak	Spacewatch	·	3.2 km	MPC · JPL
292963	2006 VD_{121}	—	November 14, 2006	Catalina	CSS	·	1.7 km	MPC · JPL
292964	2006 VE_{123}	—	November 14, 2006	Kitt Peak	Spacewatch	(5)	1.5 km	MPC · JPL
292965	2006 VK_{123}	—	November 14, 2006	Kitt Peak	Spacewatch	·	4.3 km	MPC · JPL
292966	2006 VY_{131}	—	November 15, 2006	Kitt Peak	Spacewatch	·	1.2 km	MPC · JPL
292967	2006 VK_{134}	—	November 15, 2006	Catalina	CSS	·	1.3 km	MPC · JPL
292968	2006 VO_{134}	—	November 15, 2006	Catalina	CSS	·	2.3 km	MPC · JPL
292969	2006 VL_{135}	—	November 15, 2006	Kitt Peak	Spacewatch	·	1.1 km	MPC · JPL
292970	2006 VH_{138}	—	November 15, 2006	Kitt Peak	Spacewatch	·	2.4 km	MPC · JPL
292971	2006 VK_{138}	—	November 15, 2006	Kitt Peak	Spacewatch	·	1.8 km	MPC · JPL
292972	2006 VL_{140}	—	November 15, 2006	Kitt Peak	Spacewatch	·	3.6 km	MPC · JPL
292973	2006 VQ_{140}	—	November 15, 2006	Kitt Peak	Spacewatch	·	1.1 km	MPC · JPL
292974	2006 VP_{141}	—	November 13, 2006	Kitt Peak	Spacewatch	·	860 m	MPC · JPL
292975	2006 VA_{142}	—	November 13, 2006	Catalina	CSS	·	880 m	MPC · JPL
292976	2006 VE_{145}	—	November 15, 2006	Catalina	CSS	(2076)	1.2 km	MPC · JPL
292977	2006 VQ_{148}	—	November 15, 2006	Kitt Peak	Spacewatch	·	1.6 km	MPC · JPL
292978	2006 VL_{149}	—	November 2, 2006	Catalina	CSS	THM	2.6 km	MPC · JPL
292979	2006 VA_{150}	—	November 9, 2006	Palomar	NEAT	·	2.8 km	MPC · JPL
292980	2006 VZ_{150}	—	November 9, 2006	Palomar	NEAT	·	4.1 km	MPC · JPL
292981	2006 VF_{151}	—	November 9, 2006	Palomar	NEAT	·	2.6 km	MPC · JPL
292982	2006 VR_{153}	—	November 8, 2006	Palomar	NEAT	EUN	1.4 km	MPC · JPL
292983	2006 VP_{155}	—	November 15, 2006	Catalina	CSS	·	2.5 km	MPC · JPL
292984	2006 VK_{168}	—	November 11, 2006	Kitt Peak	Spacewatch	NYS	1.4 km	MPC · JPL
292985	2006 VT_{168}	—	November 1, 2006	Kitt Peak	Spacewatch	KOR	1.6 km	MPC · JPL
292986	2006 VV_{168}	—	November 8, 2006	Palomar	NEAT	·	1.8 km	MPC · JPL
292987	2006 VY_{168}	—	November 11, 2006	Kitt Peak	Spacewatch	HOF	3.0 km	MPC · JPL
292988	2006 VC_{169}	—	November 2, 2006	Mount Lemmon	Mount Lemmon Survey	EOS	2.4 km	MPC · JPL
292989	2006 VG_{170}	—	November 11, 2006	Mount Lemmon	Mount Lemmon Survey	·	2.1 km	MPC · JPL
292990	2006 VK_{171}	—	November 11, 2006	Mount Lemmon	Mount Lemmon Survey	·	1.9 km	MPC · JPL
292991 Lyonne	2006 WB_{1}	Lyonne	November 17, 2006	Nogales	J.-C. Merlin	HOF	3.3 km	MPC · JPL
292992	2006 WJ_{6}	—	November 16, 2006	Kitt Peak	Spacewatch	·	1.7 km	MPC · JPL
292993	2006 WS_{6}	—	November 16, 2006	Kitt Peak	Spacewatch	·	6.4 km	MPC · JPL
292994	2006 WV_{6}	—	November 16, 2006	Kitt Peak	Spacewatch	·	1.7 km	MPC · JPL
292995	2006 WD_{9}	—	November 16, 2006	Kitt Peak	Spacewatch	·	1.7 km	MPC · JPL
292996	2006 WR_{11}	—	November 16, 2006	Socorro	LINEAR	CYB	3.5 km	MPC · JPL
292997	2006 WK_{12}	—	November 16, 2006	Mount Lemmon	Mount Lemmon Survey	EUN	1.9 km	MPC · JPL
292998	2006 WK_{16}	—	November 17, 2006	Kitt Peak	Spacewatch	V	820 m	MPC · JPL
292999	2006 WF_{17}	—	November 17, 2006	Mount Lemmon	Mount Lemmon Survey	·	1.2 km	MPC · JPL
293000	2006 WY_{17}	—	November 17, 2006	Mount Lemmon	Mount Lemmon Survey	AGN	1.4 km	MPC · JPL

back to top

== See also ==
- Meanings of minor-planet names: 292001–293000
