= Meanings of minor-planet names: 292001–293000 =

As minor planet discoveries are confirmed, they are given a permanent number by the IAU's Minor Planet Center (MPC), and the discoverers can then submit names for them, following the IAU's naming conventions. The list below concerns those minor planets in the specified number-range that have received names, and explains the meanings of those names.

Official naming citations of newly named small Solar System bodies are approved and published in a bulletin by IAU's Working Group for Small Bodies Nomenclature (WGSBN). Before May 2021, citations were published in MPC's Minor Planet Circulars for many decades. Recent citations can also be found on the JPL Small-Body Database (SBDB). Until his death in 2016, German astronomer Lutz D. Schmadel compiled these citations into the Dictionary of Minor Planet Names (DMP) and regularly updated the collection.

Based on Paul Herget's The Names of the Minor Planets, Schmadel also researched the unclear origin of numerous asteroids, most of which had been named prior to World War II. This article incorporates text from this source, which is in the public domain: SBDB New namings may only be added to this list below after official publication as the preannouncement of names is condemned. The WGSBN publishes a comprehensive guideline for the naming rules of non-cometary small Solar System bodies.

== 292001–292100 ==
Named minor planet	Provisional	This minor planet was named for...	Ref · Catalog
292051 Bohlender	2006 RD_{3}	David Bohlender (born 1959) a Canadian astrophysicist and member of the IAU, who uses high-resolution spectroscopy to research magnetars and chemically peculiar stars (such as Bp stars), emission-line stars, exoplanets, and the interstellar medium (Src, IAU)	JPL · 292051

== 292101–292200 ==
back to top

Named minor planet	Provisional	This minor planet was named for...	Ref · Catalog
292159 Jongoldstein	2006 RU_{105}	Jon Goldstein (born 1981), an American research engineer and PhD student at George Mason University and BAE Systems, who is focused in computer simulations of social systems	JPL · 292159
292160 Davefask	2006 RG_{107}	David Fask (born 1982), an American psychologist from the University of Virginia whose research is focused on substance dependence and abuse. His PhD thesis explored the cognitive development of twins.	JPL · 292160

== 292201–292300 ==
back to top

Named minor planet	Provisional	This minor planet was named for...	Ref · Catalog
There are no named minor planets in this number range

== 292301–292400 ==
back to top

Named minor planet	Provisional	This minor planet was named for...	Ref · Catalog
292343 Yasuosato	2006 SF_{198}	Yasuo Sato, Japanese amateur astronomer living in Nishinasuno, Tochigi Prefecture.	IAU · 292343
292352 Nicolinha	2006 SU_{218}	Nicole “Nicolinha” Semião (b. 2012) from Alagoas, Brazil has been a science disseminator since she was six years old. She is a role model for children in citizenscience projects. Nicole has reached thousands of children through lectures in schools and scientific outreach.	IAU · 292352

== 292401–292500 ==
back to top

Named minor planet	Provisional	This minor planet was named for...	Ref · Catalog
292459 Antoniolasciac	2006 SO_{366}	Antonio Lasciac (1856–1946), an Italian–Slovene architect, engineer, poet and musician, who designed the Khedive Palace in Istanbul and the Tahra Palace in Cairo	JPL · 292459
292490 Sienkiewicz	2006 SH_{406}	Henryk Sienkiewicz, one of the most famous Polish writers and the recipient of the 1905 Nobel Prize in Literature.	IAU · 292490

== 292501–292600 ==
back to top

Named minor planet	Provisional	This minor planet was named for...	Ref · Catalog
There are no named minor planets in this number range

== 292601–292700 ==
back to top

Named minor planet	Provisional	This minor planet was named for...	Ref · Catalog
There are no named minor planets in this number range

== 292701–292800 ==
back to top

Named minor planet	Provisional	This minor planet was named for...	Ref · Catalog
There are no named minor planets in this number range

== 292801–292900 ==
back to top

Named minor planet	Provisional	This minor planet was named for...	Ref · Catalog
292856 Peeters	2006 UE_{341}	Els Peeters (b. 1973), a Belgian-Canadian astronomer.	IAU · 292856
292872 Anoushankar	2006 VV_{12}	Anoushka Shankar (born 1981), an Indian sitar musician and composer	JPL · 292872

== 292901–293000 ==
back to top

Named minor planet	Provisional	This minor planet was named for...	Ref · Catalog
292991 Lyonne	2006 WB_{1}	Laurence Lyonne (born 1969) and Jean-Claude Lyonne (born 1965), both active and enthusiastic leaders of the French astronomy club "Le Curieux du Ciel" at Gueugnon, Burgundy, which they founded in 1999	JPL · 292991; IAU

back to top

Preceded by 291,001–292,000	Meanings of minor-planet names List of minor planets: 292,001–293,000	Succeeded by 293,001–294,000
