= List of minor planets: 444001–445000 =

The following is a partial list of minor planets, running from minor-planet number 444001 through 445000, inclusive. The primary data for this and other partial lists is based on JPL's "Small-Body Orbital Elements" and data available from the Minor Planet Center. Critical list information is also provided by the MPC, unless otherwise specified from Lowell Observatory. A detailed description of the table's columns and additional sources are given on the main page including a complete list of every page in this series, and a statistical break-up on the dynamical classification of minor planets.

Also see the summary list of all named bodies in numerical and alphabetical order, and the corresponding naming citations for the number range of this particular list. New namings may only be added to this list after official publication, as the preannouncement of names is condemned by the Working Group for Small Bodies Nomenclature of the International Astronomical Union.

Near-Earth obj.	MBA (inner)	MBA (outer)	Centaur
Mars-crosser	MBA (middle)	Jupiter trojan	Trans-Neptunian obj.
Unclassified

== 444001–444100 ==
Designation			Discovery			Properties		Ref
Permanent	Provisional	Named after	Date	Site	Discoverer(s)	Category	Diam.	Ref
444001	2003 YN_{80}	—	December 18, 2003	Socorro	LINEAR	MAR	1.4 km	MPC · JPL
444002	2003 YG_{117}	—	December 27, 2003	Socorro	LINEAR	·	2.0 km	MPC · JPL
444003	2003 YY_{120}	—	December 27, 2003	Socorro	LINEAR	·	4.3 km	MPC · JPL
444004	2004 AS_{1}	—	January 13, 2004	Socorro	LINEAR	APO · PHA	270 m	MPC · JPL
444005	2004 BA_{65}	—	January 22, 2004	Socorro	LINEAR	EUN	1.3 km	MPC · JPL
444006	2004 BF_{91}	—	January 24, 2004	Socorro	LINEAR	·	2.1 km	MPC · JPL
444007	2004 BU_{99}	—	January 18, 2004	Kitt Peak	Spacewatch	·	1.6 km	MPC · JPL
444008	2004 BE_{126}	—	December 22, 2003	Kitt Peak	Spacewatch	EUN	1.2 km	MPC · JPL
444009	2004 BK_{144}	—	January 19, 2004	Kitt Peak	Spacewatch	·	1.2 km	MPC · JPL
444010	2004 CO_{12}	—	January 30, 2004	Kitt Peak	Spacewatch	·	940 m	MPC · JPL
444011	2004 CY_{27}	—	February 12, 2004	Kitt Peak	Spacewatch	·	2.1 km	MPC · JPL
444012	2004 CB_{89}	—	February 11, 2004	Kitt Peak	Spacewatch	·	1.3 km	MPC · JPL
444013	2004 DM_{8}	—	February 17, 2004	Kitt Peak	Spacewatch	·	970 m	MPC · JPL
444014	2004 DW_{11}	—	February 17, 2004	Kitt Peak	Spacewatch	·	1.9 km	MPC · JPL
444015	2004 DH_{54}	—	February 12, 2004	Kitt Peak	Spacewatch	·	1.6 km	MPC · JPL
444016	2004 EQ_{60}	—	February 17, 2004	Catalina	CSS	·	1.9 km	MPC · JPL
444017	2004 EH_{92}	—	March 15, 2004	Kitt Peak	Spacewatch	·	2.0 km	MPC · JPL
444018	2004 EU_{95}	—	March 15, 2004	Kitt Peak	M. W. Buie	cubewano (cold)	136 km	MPC · JPL
444019	2004 FJ_{94}	—	March 23, 2004	Socorro	LINEAR	·	620 m	MPC · JPL
444020	2004 FU_{94}	—	February 23, 2004	Socorro	LINEAR	·	680 m	MPC · JPL
444021	2004 FL_{131}	—	March 22, 2004	Socorro	LINEAR	·	2.4 km	MPC · JPL
444022	2004 FP_{149}	—	March 16, 2004	Kitt Peak	Spacewatch	·	1.9 km	MPC · JPL
444023	2004 GH_{13}	—	April 12, 2004	Siding Spring	SSS	·	1.0 km	MPC · JPL
444024	2004 GD_{14}	—	April 13, 2004	Catalina	CSS	PHO	1.2 km	MPC · JPL
444025	2004 HJ_{79}	—	March 13, 2013	Kitt Peak	Research and Education Collaborative Occultation Network	cubewano (cold) · moon	125 km	MPC · JPL
444026	2004 JC_{44}	—	May 12, 2004	Anderson Mesa	LONEOS	·	780 m	MPC · JPL
444027	2004 KK_{14}	—	May 23, 2004	Socorro	LINEAR	BRA	2.0 km	MPC · JPL
444028	2004 LB_{10}	—	June 11, 2004	Kitt Peak	Spacewatch	·	1.9 km	MPC · JPL
444029	2004 NJ_{11}	—	July 11, 2004	Socorro	LINEAR	·	980 m	MPC · JPL
444030	2004 NT_{33}	—	July 13, 2004	Palomar	Palomar	cubewano (hot)	423 km	MPC · JPL
444031	2004 PQ_{16}	—	August 7, 2004	Siding Spring	SSS	·	1.4 km	MPC · JPL
444032	2004 PE_{26}	—	August 8, 2004	Socorro	LINEAR	PHO	890 m	MPC · JPL
444033	2004 PE_{29}	—	August 6, 2004	Campo Imperatore	CINEOS	·	940 m	MPC · JPL
444034	2004 PH_{29}	—	August 7, 2004	Palomar	NEAT	·	1 km	MPC · JPL
444035	2004 PL_{32}	—	August 8, 2004	Socorro	LINEAR	·	3.1 km	MPC · JPL
444036	2004 PH_{45}	—	August 7, 2004	Palomar	NEAT	·	1 km	MPC · JPL
444037	2004 PG_{51}	—	June 27, 2004	Siding Spring	SSS	·	2.7 km	MPC · JPL
444038	2004 PC_{77}	—	July 17, 2004	Socorro	LINEAR	·	2.7 km	MPC · JPL
444039	2004 PJ_{83}	—	August 10, 2004	Socorro	LINEAR	·	3.3 km	MPC · JPL
444040	2004 PR_{111}	—	August 11, 2004	Palomar	NEAT	·	3.4 km	MPC · JPL
444041	2004 PF_{114}	—	August 7, 2004	Palomar	NEAT	·	880 m	MPC · JPL
444042	2004 PS_{114}	—	August 12, 2004	Palomar	NEAT	·	1.1 km	MPC · JPL
444043	2004 QR_{5}	—	August 17, 2004	Socorro	LINEAR	H	710 m	MPC · JPL
444044	2004 QR_{10}	—	August 21, 2004	Siding Spring	SSS	·	1.1 km	MPC · JPL
444045	2004 QY_{26}	—	August 21, 2004	Siding Spring	SSS	H	500 m	MPC · JPL
444046	2004 QX_{28}	—	August 25, 2004	Kitt Peak	Spacewatch	·	2.4 km	MPC · JPL
444047	2004 RD_{30}	—	August 8, 2004	Anderson Mesa	LONEOS	·	890 m	MPC · JPL
444048	2004 RG_{42}	—	September 7, 2004	Kitt Peak	Spacewatch	·	2.8 km	MPC · JPL
444049	2004 RQ_{42}	—	September 8, 2004	Socorro	LINEAR	NYS	1.1 km	MPC · JPL
444050	2004 RY_{43}	—	September 8, 2004	Socorro	LINEAR	MAS	580 m	MPC · JPL
444051	2004 RP_{46}	—	September 8, 2004	Socorro	LINEAR	·	3.2 km	MPC · JPL
444052	2004 RZ_{47}	—	September 8, 2004	Socorro	LINEAR	NYS	890 m	MPC · JPL
444053	2004 RK_{75}	—	September 8, 2004	Socorro	LINEAR	·	1.3 km	MPC · JPL
444054	2004 RC_{84}	—	September 10, 2004	Kitt Peak	Spacewatch	H	490 m	MPC · JPL
444055	2004 RU_{106}	—	August 26, 2004	Catalina	CSS	·	2.9 km	MPC · JPL
444056	2004 RG_{129}	—	September 7, 2004	Kitt Peak	Spacewatch	EOS	1.8 km	MPC · JPL
444057	2004 RH_{136}	—	August 19, 2004	Socorro	LINEAR	·	3.4 km	MPC · JPL
444058	2004 RH_{150}	—	September 9, 2004	Socorro	LINEAR	·	2.4 km	MPC · JPL
444059	2004 RO_{153}	—	September 10, 2004	Socorro	LINEAR	·	1.1 km	MPC · JPL
444060	2004 RU_{162}	—	September 11, 2004	Socorro	LINEAR	·	910 m	MPC · JPL
444061	2004 RK_{166}	—	September 7, 2004	Socorro	LINEAR	MAS	620 m	MPC · JPL
444062	2004 RQ_{167}	—	August 11, 2004	Socorro	LINEAR	·	1.1 km	MPC · JPL
444063	2004 RC_{179}	—	September 10, 2004	Socorro	LINEAR	·	1.4 km	MPC · JPL
444064	2004 RN_{182}	—	September 10, 2004	Socorro	LINEAR	·	3.3 km	MPC · JPL
444065	2004 RE_{184}	—	September 10, 2004	Socorro	LINEAR	·	2.6 km	MPC · JPL
444066	2004 RX_{213}	—	September 11, 2004	Socorro	LINEAR	·	2.0 km	MPC · JPL
444067	2004 RX_{218}	—	September 11, 2004	Socorro	LINEAR	·	3.8 km	MPC · JPL
444068	2004 RE_{226}	—	August 11, 2004	Socorro	LINEAR	·	1.0 km	MPC · JPL
444069	2004 RN_{228}	—	September 9, 2004	Kitt Peak	Spacewatch	·	2.9 km	MPC · JPL
444070	2004 RT_{241}	—	September 10, 2004	Kitt Peak	Spacewatch	THM	2.0 km	MPC · JPL
444071	2004 RE_{256}	—	September 7, 2004	Socorro	LINEAR	·	3.3 km	MPC · JPL
444072	2004 RX_{263}	—	September 10, 2004	Kitt Peak	Spacewatch	·	1.0 km	MPC · JPL
444073	2004 RY_{271}	—	September 11, 2004	Kitt Peak	Spacewatch	THM	1.8 km	MPC · JPL
444074	2004 RJ_{282}	—	September 15, 2004	Kitt Peak	Spacewatch	THM	2.1 km	MPC · JPL
444075	2004 RL_{296}	—	September 11, 2004	Kitt Peak	Spacewatch	·	950 m	MPC · JPL
444076	2004 RQ_{302}	—	September 11, 2004	Kitt Peak	Spacewatch	NYS	1 km	MPC · JPL
444077	2004 RX_{305}	—	September 12, 2004	Socorro	LINEAR	·	3.5 km	MPC · JPL
444078	2004 RT_{313}	—	September 15, 2004	Kitt Peak	Spacewatch	·	2.5 km	MPC · JPL
444079	2004 RT_{315}	—	September 15, 2004	Siding Spring	SSS	·	3.5 km	MPC · JPL
444080	2004 RV_{335}	—	September 15, 2004	Kitt Peak	Spacewatch	·	2.4 km	MPC · JPL
444081	2004 SO_{3}	—	September 17, 2004	Socorro	LINEAR	H	450 m	MPC · JPL
444082	2004 SB_{21}	—	September 21, 2004	Socorro	LINEAR	·	1.8 km	MPC · JPL
444083	2004 SY_{23}	—	September 17, 2004	Kitt Peak	Spacewatch	·	1.1 km	MPC · JPL
444084	2004 SC_{24}	—	September 7, 2004	Kitt Peak	Spacewatch	·	2.3 km	MPC · JPL
444085	2004 SU_{39}	—	September 17, 2004	Socorro	LINEAR	THB	3.3 km	MPC · JPL
444086	2004 SV_{46}	—	September 18, 2004	Socorro	LINEAR	·	3.5 km	MPC · JPL
444087	2004 SY_{46}	—	September 18, 2004	Socorro	LINEAR	·	3.5 km	MPC · JPL
444088	2004 SO_{51}	—	August 19, 2004	Siding Spring	SSS	THB	2.9 km	MPC · JPL
444089	2004 SH_{58}	—	September 9, 2004	Socorro	LINEAR	·	1.4 km	MPC · JPL
444090	2004 TW_{10}	—	October 8, 2004	Socorro	LINEAR	H	600 m	MPC · JPL
444091	2004 TG_{14}	—	October 9, 2004	Socorro	LINEAR	·	1.3 km	MPC · JPL
444092	2004 TX_{23}	—	October 4, 2004	Kitt Peak	Spacewatch	NYS	990 m	MPC · JPL
444093	2004 TV_{25}	—	October 4, 2004	Kitt Peak	Spacewatch	VER	3.0 km	MPC · JPL
444094	2004 TA_{29}	—	October 4, 2004	Kitt Peak	Spacewatch	·	1.2 km	MPC · JPL
444095	2004 TF_{33}	—	September 22, 2004	Kitt Peak	Spacewatch	NYS	870 m	MPC · JPL
444096	2004 TE_{34}	—	October 4, 2004	Kitt Peak	Spacewatch	·	2.8 km	MPC · JPL
444097	2004 TY_{34}	—	September 9, 2004	Campo Imperatore	CINEOS	·	3.2 km	MPC · JPL
444098	2004 TC_{36}	—	October 4, 2004	Kitt Peak	Spacewatch	·	3.1 km	MPC · JPL
444099	2004 TG_{36}	—	September 9, 2004	Kitt Peak	Spacewatch	·	2.1 km	MPC · JPL
444100	2004 TQ_{40}	—	September 10, 2004	Kitt Peak	Spacewatch	THM	2.1 km	MPC · JPL

== 444101–444200 ==
back to top

Designation			Discovery			Properties		Ref
Permanent	Provisional	Named after	Date	Site	Discoverer(s)	Category	Diam.	Ref
444101	2004 TY_{40}	—	October 4, 2004	Kitt Peak	Spacewatch	·	1.0 km	MPC · JPL
444102	2004 TJ_{49}	—	October 4, 2004	Kitt Peak	Spacewatch	·	1.0 km	MPC · JPL
444103	2004 TG_{51}	—	October 4, 2004	Kitt Peak	Spacewatch	NYS	1.0 km	MPC · JPL
444104	2004 TZ_{56}	—	October 5, 2004	Kitt Peak	Spacewatch	·	2.3 km	MPC · JPL
444105	2004 TR_{59}	—	October 5, 2004	Kitt Peak	Spacewatch	THM	2.1 km	MPC · JPL
444106	2004 TX_{68}	—	October 5, 2004	Anderson Mesa	LONEOS	·	2.7 km	MPC · JPL
444107	2004 TF_{88}	—	October 5, 2004	Kitt Peak	Spacewatch	·	830 m	MPC · JPL
444108	2004 TQ_{92}	—	September 17, 2004	Kitt Peak	Spacewatch	·	2.4 km	MPC · JPL
444109	2004 TF_{111}	—	October 7, 2004	Kitt Peak	Spacewatch	·	3.0 km	MPC · JPL
444110	2004 TH_{112}	—	October 7, 2004	Kitt Peak	Spacewatch	·	3.2 km	MPC · JPL
444111	2004 TP_{119}	—	October 6, 2004	Palomar	NEAT	·	3.2 km	MPC · JPL
444112	2004 TR_{119}	—	October 6, 2004	Palomar	NEAT	·	3.0 km	MPC · JPL
444113	2004 TX_{121}	—	September 22, 2004	Socorro	LINEAR	MAS	710 m	MPC · JPL
444114	2004 TT_{132}	—	September 18, 2004	Socorro	LINEAR	TIR	3.1 km	MPC · JPL
444115	2004 TM_{143}	—	October 4, 2004	Kitt Peak	Spacewatch	·	3.5 km	MPC · JPL
444116	2004 TK_{151}	—	September 10, 2004	Kitt Peak	Spacewatch	EMA	3.0 km	MPC · JPL
444117	2004 TX_{156}	—	October 6, 2004	Kitt Peak	Spacewatch	EOS	1.4 km	MPC · JPL
444118	2004 TE_{159}	—	October 6, 2004	Kitt Peak	Spacewatch	·	1.2 km	MPC · JPL
444119	2004 TJ_{163}	—	October 6, 2004	Kitt Peak	Spacewatch	VER	2.9 km	MPC · JPL
444120	2004 TW_{178}	—	October 7, 2004	Kitt Peak	Spacewatch	EOS	2.4 km	MPC · JPL
444121	2004 TO_{183}	—	October 7, 2004	Kitt Peak	Spacewatch	ELF	3.3 km	MPC · JPL
444122	2004 TZ_{193}	—	October 7, 2004	Kitt Peak	Spacewatch	·	2.8 km	MPC · JPL
444123	2004 TQ_{197}	—	September 7, 2004	Kitt Peak	Spacewatch	·	1.0 km	MPC · JPL
444124	2004 TD_{207}	—	October 7, 2004	Kitt Peak	Spacewatch	·	4.0 km	MPC · JPL
444125	2004 TF_{212}	—	October 8, 2004	Kitt Peak	Spacewatch	T_{j} (2.99)	3.1 km	MPC · JPL
444126	2004 TT_{215}	—	October 10, 2004	Kitt Peak	Spacewatch	·	1 km	MPC · JPL
444127	2004 TW_{234}	—	October 8, 2004	Socorro	LINEAR	·	4.6 km	MPC · JPL
444128	2004 TY_{269}	—	October 9, 2004	Kitt Peak	Spacewatch	THM	1.8 km	MPC · JPL
444129	2004 TM_{272}	—	October 9, 2004	Kitt Peak	Spacewatch	ERI	1.4 km	MPC · JPL
444130	2004 TZ_{310}	—	October 9, 2004	Anderson Mesa	LONEOS	·	3.6 km	MPC · JPL
444131	2004 TR_{334}	—	September 23, 2004	Kitt Peak	Spacewatch	·	2.3 km	MPC · JPL
444132	2004 TV_{343}	—	October 14, 2004	Kitt Peak	Spacewatch	EOS	2.1 km	MPC · JPL
444133	2004 TH_{344}	—	October 4, 2004	Kitt Peak	Spacewatch	·	1.0 km	MPC · JPL
444134	2004 TL_{366}	—	October 10, 2004	Kitt Peak	M. W. Buie	·	1.0 km	MPC · JPL
444135	2004 UB_{11}	—	October 18, 2004	Socorro	LINEAR	PHO	810 m	MPC · JPL
444136	2004 VX_{1}	—	November 2, 2004	Anderson Mesa	LONEOS	·	1.3 km	MPC · JPL
444137	2004 VZ_{2}	—	October 9, 2004	Kitt Peak	Spacewatch	·	1.4 km	MPC · JPL
444138	2004 VE_{15}	—	November 5, 2004	Palomar	NEAT	·	5.0 km	MPC · JPL
444139	2004 VK_{15}	—	November 6, 2004	Needville	J. Dellinger, Lowe, A.	HYG	2.8 km	MPC · JPL
444140	2004 VR_{21}	—	November 4, 2004	Catalina	CSS	·	1.3 km	MPC · JPL
444141	2004 VX_{39}	—	November 4, 2004	Kitt Peak	Spacewatch	·	1 km	MPC · JPL
444142	2004 VO_{41}	—	October 10, 2004	Kitt Peak	Spacewatch	·	2.4 km	MPC · JPL
444143	2004 VT_{49}	—	November 4, 2004	Kitt Peak	Spacewatch	LIX	3.4 km	MPC · JPL
444144	2004 VO_{51}	—	November 4, 2004	Kitt Peak	Spacewatch	·	1.3 km	MPC · JPL
444145	2004 VC_{54}	—	September 25, 2004	Socorro	LINEAR	·	4.2 km	MPC · JPL
444146	2004 WO_{4}	—	November 17, 2004	Campo Imperatore	CINEOS	·	1.2 km	MPC · JPL
444147	2004 XZ_{14}	—	December 8, 2004	Socorro	LINEAR	NYS	1.1 km	MPC · JPL
444148	2004 XR_{47}	—	December 9, 2004	Kitt Peak	Spacewatch	NYS	1.1 km	MPC · JPL
444149	2004 YT	—	November 10, 2004	Kitt Peak	Spacewatch	·	1.1 km	MPC · JPL
444150	2004 YW_{10}	—	November 10, 2004	Kitt Peak	Spacewatch	·	1.2 km	MPC · JPL
444151	2005 EE_{138}	—	March 9, 2005	Socorro	LINEAR	·	1.6 km	MPC · JPL
444152	2005 EF_{177}	—	March 8, 2005	Mount Lemmon	Mount Lemmon Survey	·	2.0 km	MPC · JPL
444153	2005 ET_{178}	—	March 9, 2005	Kitt Peak	Spacewatch	·	1.4 km	MPC · JPL
444154	2005 EY_{187}	—	March 10, 2005	Mount Lemmon	Mount Lemmon Survey	·	1.5 km	MPC · JPL
444155	2005 ER_{197}	—	March 11, 2005	Mount Lemmon	Mount Lemmon Survey	·	1.4 km	MPC · JPL
444156	2005 EH_{266}	—	March 13, 2005	Kitt Peak	Spacewatch	·	2.0 km	MPC · JPL
444157	2005 GP_{22}	—	April 5, 2005	Siding Spring	SSS	·	1.9 km	MPC · JPL
444158	2005 GL_{61}	—	March 9, 2005	Mount Lemmon	Mount Lemmon Survey	·	1.8 km	MPC · JPL
444159	2005 GZ_{83}	—	April 4, 2005	Kitt Peak	Spacewatch	·	1.7 km	MPC · JPL
444160	2005 GU_{116}	—	April 11, 2005	Kitt Peak	Spacewatch	·	1.4 km	MPC · JPL
444161	2005 GP_{125}	—	April 10, 2005	Mount Lemmon	Mount Lemmon Survey	·	2.0 km	MPC · JPL
444162	2005 GN_{129}	—	April 7, 2005	Kitt Peak	Spacewatch	·	1.8 km	MPC · JPL
444163	2005 GU_{173}	—	April 14, 2005	Kitt Peak	Spacewatch	·	770 m	MPC · JPL
444164	2005 JN_{4}	—	May 1, 2005	Kitt Peak	Spacewatch	·	1.6 km	MPC · JPL
444165	2005 JY_{47}	—	May 3, 2005	Kitt Peak	Spacewatch	·	1.8 km	MPC · JPL
444166	2005 JY_{78}	—	May 10, 2005	Mount Lemmon	Mount Lemmon Survey	·	2.0 km	MPC · JPL
444167	2005 JF_{89}	—	May 11, 2005	Kitt Peak	Spacewatch	·	2.1 km	MPC · JPL
444168	2005 JP_{97}	—	May 8, 2005	Kitt Peak	Spacewatch	·	1.4 km	MPC · JPL
444169	2005 JO_{106}	—	May 12, 2005	Bergisch Gladbach	W. Bickel	·	2.5 km	MPC · JPL
444170	2005 JZ_{135}	—	May 11, 2005	Anderson Mesa	LONEOS	·	1.9 km	MPC · JPL
444171	2005 KC_{1}	—	May 16, 2005	Kitt Peak	Spacewatch	·	640 m	MPC · JPL
444172	2005 LO_{4}	—	June 1, 2005	Kitt Peak	Spacewatch	·	2.1 km	MPC · JPL
444173	2005 NE_{81}	—	July 9, 2005	Kitt Peak	Spacewatch	·	470 m	MPC · JPL
444174	2005 NZ_{104}	—	June 13, 2005	Mount Lemmon	Mount Lemmon Survey	·	1.9 km	MPC · JPL
444175	2005 OH_{5}	—	July 28, 2005	Palomar	NEAT	·	720 m	MPC · JPL
444176	2005 OA_{20}	—	July 28, 2005	Palomar	NEAT	·	840 m	MPC · JPL
444177	2005 QA_{1}	—	July 28, 2005	Palomar	NEAT	·	580 m	MPC · JPL
444178	2005 QP_{1}	—	August 22, 2005	Palomar	NEAT	MRX	1.2 km	MPC · JPL
444179	2005 QV_{40}	—	August 26, 2005	Palomar	NEAT	·	2.0 km	MPC · JPL
444180	2005 QZ_{120}	—	August 28, 2005	Kitt Peak	Spacewatch	·	2.1 km	MPC · JPL
444181	2005 QY_{121}	—	August 28, 2005	Kitt Peak	Spacewatch	·	1.8 km	MPC · JPL
444182	2005 QB_{180}	—	August 26, 2005	Palomar	NEAT	·	770 m	MPC · JPL
444183	2005 QH_{187}	—	August 30, 2005	Kitt Peak	Spacewatch	·	680 m	MPC · JPL
444184	2005 RY_{12}	—	September 1, 2005	Kitt Peak	Spacewatch	·	650 m	MPC · JPL
444185	2005 SR_{1}	—	September 23, 2005	Kitt Peak	Spacewatch	AMO	510 m	MPC · JPL
444186	2005 SC_{15}	—	September 26, 2005	Kitt Peak	Spacewatch	·	490 m	MPC · JPL
444187	2005 SH_{25}	—	September 26, 2005	Catalina	CSS	·	690 m	MPC · JPL
444188	2005 SN_{28}	—	September 23, 2005	Kitt Peak	Spacewatch	EOS	1.7 km	MPC · JPL
444189	2005 SR_{41}	—	September 24, 2005	Kitt Peak	Spacewatch	·	740 m	MPC · JPL
444190	2005 SP_{57}	—	September 26, 2005	Kitt Peak	Spacewatch	EOS	1.6 km	MPC · JPL
444191	2005 SF_{64}	—	September 26, 2005	Kitt Peak	Spacewatch	·	2.1 km	MPC · JPL
444192	2005 SW_{66}	—	September 27, 2005	Kitt Peak	Spacewatch	·	1.4 km	MPC · JPL
444193	2005 SE_{71}	—	September 30, 2005	Mount Lemmon	Mount Lemmon Survey	APO +1km · PHA	440 m	MPC · JPL
444194	2005 SM_{80}	—	September 24, 2005	Kitt Peak	Spacewatch	·	800 m	MPC · JPL
444195	2005 SQ_{90}	—	September 24, 2005	Kitt Peak	Spacewatch	·	720 m	MPC · JPL
444196	2005 SO_{93}	—	September 24, 2005	Kitt Peak	Spacewatch	·	740 m	MPC · JPL
444197	2005 SZ_{108}	—	September 26, 2005	Kitt Peak	Spacewatch	·	580 m	MPC · JPL
444198	2005 SK_{121}	—	September 1, 2005	Kitt Peak	Spacewatch	·	640 m	MPC · JPL
444199	2005 SQ_{146}	—	September 25, 2005	Kitt Peak	Spacewatch	·	1.8 km	MPC · JPL
444200	2005 SM_{156}	—	September 26, 2005	Kitt Peak	Spacewatch	KOR	1.3 km	MPC · JPL

== 444201–444300 ==
back to top

Designation			Discovery			Properties		Ref
Permanent	Provisional	Named after	Date	Site	Discoverer(s)	Category	Diam.	Ref
444201	2005 SK_{181}	—	September 29, 2005	Kitt Peak	Spacewatch	·	810 m	MPC · JPL
444202	2005 SH_{233}	—	September 30, 2005	Mount Lemmon	Mount Lemmon Survey	HYG	2.9 km	MPC · JPL
444203	2005 SV_{235}	—	September 29, 2005	Kitt Peak	Spacewatch	·	1.6 km	MPC · JPL
444204	2005 SE_{252}	—	August 31, 2005	Kitt Peak	Spacewatch	·	740 m	MPC · JPL
444205	2005 SM_{285}	—	September 25, 2005	Apache Point	A. C. Becker	·	2.4 km	MPC · JPL
444206	2005 SC_{291}	—	September 30, 2005	Mount Lemmon	Mount Lemmon Survey	·	1.3 km	MPC · JPL
444207	2005 SK_{293}	—	September 23, 2005	Catalina	CSS	EOS	2.0 km	MPC · JPL
444208	2005 TR_{34}	—	October 1, 2005	Kitt Peak	Spacewatch	KOR	1.2 km	MPC · JPL
444209	2005 TU_{54}	—	October 1, 2005	Catalina	CSS	·	730 m	MPC · JPL
444210	2005 TP_{57}	—	October 1, 2005	Mount Lemmon	Mount Lemmon Survey	·	830 m	MPC · JPL
444211	2005 TL_{58}	—	October 1, 2005	Mount Lemmon	Mount Lemmon Survey	·	1.2 km	MPC · JPL
444212	2005 TH_{68}	—	October 5, 2005	Kitt Peak	Spacewatch	·	2.6 km	MPC · JPL
444213	2005 TC_{78}	—	October 7, 2005	Mount Lemmon	Mount Lemmon Survey	·	1.1 km	MPC · JPL
444214	2005 TY_{78}	—	October 7, 2005	Kitt Peak	Spacewatch	·	1.3 km	MPC · JPL
444215	2005 TM_{83}	—	October 3, 2005	Catalina	CSS	·	650 m	MPC · JPL
444216	2005 TG_{87}	—	October 5, 2005	Kitt Peak	Spacewatch	·	610 m	MPC · JPL
444217	2005 TN_{112}	—	September 27, 2005	Kitt Peak	Spacewatch	·	720 m	MPC · JPL
444218	2005 TE_{119}	—	October 7, 2005	Kitt Peak	Spacewatch	KOR	1.4 km	MPC · JPL
444219	2005 TW_{120}	—	October 7, 2005	Kitt Peak	Spacewatch	KOR	1.2 km	MPC · JPL
444220	2005 TT_{122}	—	September 29, 2005	Mount Lemmon	Mount Lemmon Survey	·	1.4 km	MPC · JPL
444221	2005 TJ_{137}	—	September 25, 2005	Kitt Peak	Spacewatch	·	660 m	MPC · JPL
444222	2005 TM_{180}	—	October 1, 2005	Kitt Peak	Spacewatch	EOS	1.6 km	MPC · JPL
444223	2005 TN_{187}	—	October 6, 2005	Mount Lemmon	Mount Lemmon Survey	·	2.6 km	MPC · JPL
444224	2005 TO_{194}	—	October 10, 2005	Catalina	CSS	·	2.9 km	MPC · JPL
444225	2005 US_{5}	—	October 27, 2005	Socorro	LINEAR	H	420 m	MPC · JPL
444226	2005 UN_{6}	—	October 22, 2005	Kitt Peak	Spacewatch	H	550 m	MPC · JPL
444227	2005 UA_{32}	—	October 24, 2005	Kitt Peak	Spacewatch	·	2.5 km	MPC · JPL
444228	2005 UY_{42}	—	October 22, 2005	Kitt Peak	Spacewatch	·	2.2 km	MPC · JPL
444229	2005 UJ_{47}	—	October 22, 2005	Catalina	CSS	·	680 m	MPC · JPL
444230	2005 UH_{71}	—	October 10, 2005	Catalina	CSS	·	650 m	MPC · JPL
444231	2005 UX_{72}	—	October 23, 2005	Palomar	NEAT	·	1.6 km	MPC · JPL
444232	2005 UL_{83}	—	October 22, 2005	Kitt Peak	Spacewatch	EOS	1.6 km	MPC · JPL
444233	2005 UW_{83}	—	October 22, 2005	Kitt Peak	Spacewatch	·	1.9 km	MPC · JPL
444234	2005 UW_{94}	—	October 22, 2005	Kitt Peak	Spacewatch	·	1.8 km	MPC · JPL
444235	2005 UZ_{97}	—	October 22, 2005	Kitt Peak	Spacewatch	·	1.8 km	MPC · JPL
444236	2005 UE_{100}	—	October 22, 2005	Kitt Peak	Spacewatch	·	620 m	MPC · JPL
444237	2005 UL_{111}	—	October 22, 2005	Kitt Peak	Spacewatch	·	1.8 km	MPC · JPL
444238	2005 UR_{125}	—	October 24, 2005	Kitt Peak	Spacewatch	·	610 m	MPC · JPL
444239	2005 UL_{135}	—	October 25, 2005	Kitt Peak	Spacewatch	·	630 m	MPC · JPL
444240	2005 UM_{135}	—	October 25, 2005	Kitt Peak	Spacewatch	·	1.8 km	MPC · JPL
444241	2005 US_{144}	—	October 26, 2005	Kitt Peak	Spacewatch	·	1.5 km	MPC · JPL
444242	2005 US_{149}	—	October 26, 2005	Kitt Peak	Spacewatch	·	570 m	MPC · JPL
444243	2005 UU_{149}	—	October 26, 2005	Kitt Peak	Spacewatch	·	1.6 km	MPC · JPL
444244	2005 UD_{154}	—	October 26, 2005	Kitt Peak	Spacewatch	·	2.6 km	MPC · JPL
444245	2005 UF_{159}	—	October 25, 2005	Catalina	CSS	H	560 m	MPC · JPL
444246	2005 UG_{165}	—	October 24, 2005	Kitt Peak	Spacewatch	(2076)	620 m	MPC · JPL
444247	2005 UA_{169}	—	October 24, 2005	Kitt Peak	Spacewatch	·	3.1 km	MPC · JPL
444248	2005 UM_{171}	—	October 24, 2005	Kitt Peak	Spacewatch	EOS	1.8 km	MPC · JPL
444249	2005 UA_{179}	—	October 24, 2005	Kitt Peak	Spacewatch	EOS	1.6 km	MPC · JPL
444250	2005 US_{183}	—	October 25, 2005	Mount Lemmon	Mount Lemmon Survey	·	480 m	MPC · JPL
444251	2005 UX_{191}	—	October 27, 2005	Mount Lemmon	Mount Lemmon Survey	·	2.9 km	MPC · JPL
444252	2005 UG_{193}	—	September 29, 2005	Mount Lemmon	Mount Lemmon Survey	·	1.5 km	MPC · JPL
444253	2005 UT_{195}	—	October 24, 2005	Kitt Peak	Spacewatch	KOR	1.2 km	MPC · JPL
444254	2005 UL_{206}	—	October 27, 2005	Kitt Peak	Spacewatch	·	1.3 km	MPC · JPL
444255	2005 UB_{212}	—	October 27, 2005	Kitt Peak	Spacewatch	·	2.6 km	MPC · JPL
444256	2005 US_{219}	—	October 25, 2005	Kitt Peak	Spacewatch	·	1.9 km	MPC · JPL
444257	2005 UG_{224}	—	October 25, 2005	Kitt Peak	Spacewatch	·	660 m	MPC · JPL
444258	2005 UU_{232}	—	October 25, 2005	Mount Lemmon	Mount Lemmon Survey	·	620 m	MPC · JPL
444259	2005 UT_{236}	—	October 25, 2005	Kitt Peak	Spacewatch	·	1.9 km	MPC · JPL
444260	2005 UA_{238}	—	October 25, 2005	Kitt Peak	Spacewatch	·	690 m	MPC · JPL
444261	2005 UX_{240}	—	October 25, 2005	Kitt Peak	Spacewatch	·	680 m	MPC · JPL
444262	2005 UX_{244}	—	October 25, 2005	Kitt Peak	Spacewatch	·	830 m	MPC · JPL
444263	2005 UD_{258}	—	October 25, 2005	Kitt Peak	Spacewatch	·	1.1 km	MPC · JPL
444264	2005 UU_{265}	—	October 27, 2005	Kitt Peak	Spacewatch	·	1.5 km	MPC · JPL
444265	2005 UT_{269}	—	October 1, 2005	Kitt Peak	Spacewatch	·	1.5 km	MPC · JPL
444266	2005 UD_{296}	—	October 26, 2005	Kitt Peak	Spacewatch	·	1.6 km	MPC · JPL
444267	2005 UT_{297}	—	October 26, 2005	Kitt Peak	Spacewatch	·	1.9 km	MPC · JPL
444268	2005 UQ_{299}	—	October 26, 2005	Kitt Peak	Spacewatch	EOS	1.6 km	MPC · JPL
444269	2005 UD_{311}	—	October 29, 2005	Mount Lemmon	Mount Lemmon Survey	·	1.5 km	MPC · JPL
444270	2005 UA_{322}	—	October 27, 2005	Kitt Peak	Spacewatch	·	660 m	MPC · JPL
444271	2005 UV_{325}	—	October 11, 2005	Kitt Peak	Spacewatch	·	680 m	MPC · JPL
444272	2005 US_{332}	—	October 1, 2005	Mount Lemmon	Mount Lemmon Survey	·	1.4 km	MPC · JPL
444273	2005 UK_{333}	—	October 29, 2005	Mount Lemmon	Mount Lemmon Survey	·	1.8 km	MPC · JPL
444274	2005 UP_{335}	—	October 30, 2005	Socorro	LINEAR	·	2.1 km	MPC · JPL
444275	2005 UM_{336}	—	October 30, 2005	Mount Lemmon	Mount Lemmon Survey	·	2.3 km	MPC · JPL
444276	2005 UX_{349}	—	October 27, 2005	Mount Lemmon	Mount Lemmon Survey	·	3.9 km	MPC · JPL
444277	2005 UT_{380}	—	October 30, 2005	Mount Lemmon	Mount Lemmon Survey	·	1.6 km	MPC · JPL
444278	2005 UQ_{384}	—	October 27, 2005	Kitt Peak	Spacewatch	EOS	1.9 km	MPC · JPL
444279	2005 UO_{424}	—	October 28, 2005	Kitt Peak	Spacewatch	·	2.3 km	MPC · JPL
444280	2005 UK_{426}	—	October 28, 2005	Kitt Peak	Spacewatch	·	1.4 km	MPC · JPL
444281	2005 UX_{429}	—	October 28, 2005	Kitt Peak	Spacewatch	·	2.6 km	MPC · JPL
444282	2005 UF_{431}	—	October 28, 2005	Kitt Peak	Spacewatch	·	2.2 km	MPC · JPL
444283	2005 UT_{436}	—	October 31, 2005	Kitt Peak	Spacewatch	EOS	1.6 km	MPC · JPL
444284	2005 UF_{442}	—	October 29, 2005	Catalina	CSS	·	920 m	MPC · JPL
444285	2005 UB_{446}	—	October 29, 2005	Catalina	CSS	·	1.8 km	MPC · JPL
444286	2005 UH_{460}	—	October 28, 2005	Mount Lemmon	Mount Lemmon Survey	·	1.5 km	MPC · JPL
444287	2005 UV_{469}	—	October 30, 2005	Kitt Peak	Spacewatch	·	2.6 km	MPC · JPL
444288	2005 UE_{473}	—	October 30, 2005	Mount Lemmon	Mount Lemmon Survey	·	2.5 km	MPC · JPL
444289	2005 UE_{476}	—	October 23, 2005	Catalina	CSS	·	660 m	MPC · JPL
444290	2005 UP_{489}	—	October 23, 2005	Catalina	CSS	·	2.2 km	MPC · JPL
444291	2005 UY_{495}	—	October 26, 2005	Anderson Mesa	LONEOS	EOS	2.3 km	MPC · JPL
444292	2005 UJ_{511}	—	October 27, 2005	Mount Lemmon	Mount Lemmon Survey	EOS	1.5 km	MPC · JPL
444293	2005 UO_{511}	—	October 27, 2005	Mount Lemmon	Mount Lemmon Survey	THM	1.7 km	MPC · JPL
444294	2005 UM_{513}	—	October 27, 2005	Kitt Peak	Spacewatch	·	740 m	MPC · JPL
444295	2005 UM_{515}	—	October 22, 2005	Apache Point	A. C. Becker	·	2.7 km	MPC · JPL
444296	2005 UV_{517}	—	October 25, 2005	Apache Point	A. C. Becker	·	1.6 km	MPC · JPL
444297	2005 UH_{526}	—	October 25, 2005	Kitt Peak	Spacewatch	·	1.5 km	MPC · JPL
444298	2005 UF_{527}	—	October 30, 2005	Mount Lemmon	Mount Lemmon Survey	·	480 m	MPC · JPL
444299	2005 VO_{13}	—	September 30, 2005	Mount Lemmon	Mount Lemmon Survey	·	1.9 km	MPC · JPL
444300	2005 VC_{34}	—	October 31, 2005	Mount Lemmon	Mount Lemmon Survey	·	2.9 km	MPC · JPL

== 444301–444400 ==
back to top

Designation			Discovery			Properties		Ref
Permanent	Provisional	Named after	Date	Site	Discoverer(s)	Category	Diam.	Ref
444301	2005 VO_{51}	—	October 29, 2005	Kitt Peak	Spacewatch	·	1.2 km	MPC · JPL
444302	2005 VD_{66}	—	November 1, 2005	Mount Lemmon	Mount Lemmon Survey	·	2.2 km	MPC · JPL
444303	2005 VA_{68}	—	October 22, 2005	Kitt Peak	Spacewatch	·	850 m	MPC · JPL
444304	2005 VD_{68}	—	November 2, 2005	Mount Lemmon	Mount Lemmon Survey	·	2.0 km	MPC · JPL
444305	2005 VM_{76}	—	November 4, 2005	Kitt Peak	Spacewatch	·	2.3 km	MPC · JPL
444306	2005 VX_{80}	—	October 25, 2005	Mount Lemmon	Mount Lemmon Survey	·	2.5 km	MPC · JPL
444307	2005 VF_{92}	—	November 6, 2005	Mount Lemmon	Mount Lemmon Survey	·	740 m	MPC · JPL
444308	2005 VE_{94}	—	November 6, 2005	Mount Lemmon	Mount Lemmon Survey	·	2.5 km	MPC · JPL
444309	2005 VE_{99}	—	November 10, 2005	Catalina	CSS	·	2.4 km	MPC · JPL
444310	2005 VK_{101}	—	November 2, 2005	Mount Lemmon	Mount Lemmon Survey	·	800 m	MPC · JPL
444311	2005 VT_{105}	—	October 10, 2005	Kitt Peak	Spacewatch	·	2.2 km	MPC · JPL
444312	2005 VL_{107}	—	November 5, 2005	Kitt Peak	Spacewatch	·	2.0 km	MPC · JPL
444313	2005 VP_{110}	—	September 30, 2005	Mount Lemmon	Mount Lemmon Survey	·	580 m	MPC · JPL
444314	2005 VK_{111}	—	November 6, 2005	Mount Lemmon	Mount Lemmon Survey	·	4.4 km	MPC · JPL
444315	2005 VU_{124}	—	November 4, 2005	Kitt Peak	Spacewatch	·	3.0 km	MPC · JPL
444316	2005 VJ_{134}	—	November 5, 2005	Kitt Peak	Spacewatch	TEL	1.3 km	MPC · JPL
444317	2005 WJ_{13}	—	October 25, 2005	Mount Lemmon	Mount Lemmon Survey	·	610 m	MPC · JPL
444318	2005 WC_{16}	—	November 22, 2005	Kitt Peak	Spacewatch	·	2.9 km	MPC · JPL
444319	2005 WD_{18}	—	November 22, 2005	Kitt Peak	Spacewatch	·	1.7 km	MPC · JPL
444320	2005 WU_{18}	—	November 22, 2005	Kitt Peak	Spacewatch	·	580 m	MPC · JPL
444321	2005 WX_{19}	—	November 12, 2005	Kitt Peak	Spacewatch	·	2.3 km	MPC · JPL
444322	2005 WR_{21}	—	November 21, 2005	Kitt Peak	Spacewatch	·	590 m	MPC · JPL
444323	2005 WX_{25}	—	September 30, 2005	Mount Lemmon	Mount Lemmon Survey	V	610 m	MPC · JPL
444324	2005 WB_{30}	—	November 21, 2005	Kitt Peak	Spacewatch	·	560 m	MPC · JPL
444325	2005 WW_{30}	—	November 21, 2005	Kitt Peak	Spacewatch	·	680 m	MPC · JPL
444326	2005 WL_{35}	—	November 22, 2005	Kitt Peak	Spacewatch	·	670 m	MPC · JPL
444327	2005 WL_{38}	—	November 22, 2005	Junk Bond	D. Healy	·	2.1 km	MPC · JPL
444328	2005 WR_{40}	—	November 25, 2005	Mount Lemmon	Mount Lemmon Survey	·	820 m	MPC · JPL
444329	2005 WY_{42}	—	October 27, 2005	Mount Lemmon	Mount Lemmon Survey	·	1.9 km	MPC · JPL
444330	2005 WE_{47}	—	November 25, 2005	Kitt Peak	Spacewatch	EOS	1.9 km	MPC · JPL
444331	2005 WT_{57}	—	November 21, 2005	Catalina	CSS	·	660 m	MPC · JPL
444332	2005 WH_{65}	—	October 25, 2005	Kitt Peak	Spacewatch	·	1.6 km	MPC · JPL
444333	2005 WG_{69}	—	November 26, 2005	Mount Lemmon	Mount Lemmon Survey	·	2.5 km	MPC · JPL
444334	2005 WB_{72}	—	November 22, 2005	Catalina	CSS	·	620 m	MPC · JPL
444335	2005 WH_{81}	—	November 26, 2005	Mount Lemmon	Mount Lemmon Survey	·	2.8 km	MPC · JPL
444336	2005 WW_{85}	—	November 28, 2005	Mount Lemmon	Mount Lemmon Survey	·	5.0 km	MPC · JPL
444337	2005 WB_{89}	—	October 22, 2005	Kitt Peak	Spacewatch	EOS	2.1 km	MPC · JPL
444338	2005 WD_{98}	—	November 26, 2005	Kitt Peak	Spacewatch	·	2.1 km	MPC · JPL
444339	2005 WF_{109}	—	November 30, 2005	Kitt Peak	Spacewatch	·	780 m	MPC · JPL
444340	2005 WP_{112}	—	November 30, 2005	Mount Lemmon	Mount Lemmon Survey	·	1.8 km	MPC · JPL
444341	2005 WY_{112}	—	November 25, 2005	Catalina	CSS	·	2.7 km	MPC · JPL
444342	2005 WE_{118}	—	November 28, 2005	Catalina	CSS	EOS	4.9 km	MPC · JPL
444343	2005 WG_{124}	—	November 12, 2005	Kitt Peak	Spacewatch	·	2.1 km	MPC · JPL
444344	2005 WY_{130}	—	November 25, 2005	Mount Lemmon	Mount Lemmon Survey	·	2.6 km	MPC · JPL
444345	2005 WY_{131}	—	October 25, 2005	Mount Lemmon	Mount Lemmon Survey	·	1.8 km	MPC · JPL
444346	2005 WM_{138}	—	November 26, 2005	Mount Lemmon	Mount Lemmon Survey	·	1.8 km	MPC · JPL
444347	2005 WT_{141}	—	November 28, 2005	Mount Lemmon	Mount Lemmon Survey	·	2.9 km	MPC · JPL
444348	2005 WW_{144}	—	November 6, 2005	Mount Lemmon	Mount Lemmon Survey	·	1.4 km	MPC · JPL
444349	2005 WN_{145}	—	October 28, 2005	Mount Lemmon	Mount Lemmon Survey	THM	1.8 km	MPC · JPL
444350	2005 WP_{152}	—	November 29, 2005	Kitt Peak	Spacewatch	EOS	1.7 km	MPC · JPL
444351	2005 WZ_{153}	—	November 29, 2005	Palomar	NEAT	·	680 m	MPC · JPL
444352	2005 WN_{158}	—	November 28, 2005	Socorro	LINEAR	·	3.9 km	MPC · JPL
444353	2005 WH_{169}	—	November 30, 2005	Kitt Peak	Spacewatch	·	2.0 km	MPC · JPL
444354	2005 WK_{198}	—	November 5, 2005	Kitt Peak	Spacewatch	·	3.4 km	MPC · JPL
444355	2005 XH_{9}	—	December 1, 2005	Kitt Peak	Spacewatch	·	2.4 km	MPC · JPL
444356	2005 XT_{15}	—	November 22, 2005	Kitt Peak	Spacewatch	EOS	1.7 km	MPC · JPL
444357	2005 XP_{17}	—	December 1, 2005	Kitt Peak	Spacewatch	EOS	2.2 km	MPC · JPL
444358	2005 XB_{21}	—	December 2, 2005	Mount Lemmon	Mount Lemmon Survey	·	2.8 km	MPC · JPL
444359	2005 XL_{26}	—	December 4, 2005	Mount Lemmon	Mount Lemmon Survey	·	1.3 km	MPC · JPL
444360	2005 XM_{27}	—	October 9, 1994	Kitt Peak	Spacewatch	·	1.8 km	MPC · JPL
444361	2005 XH_{37}	—	October 27, 2005	Mount Lemmon	Mount Lemmon Survey	·	2.4 km	MPC · JPL
444362	2005 XA_{47}	—	October 28, 2005	Mount Lemmon	Mount Lemmon Survey	·	2.5 km	MPC · JPL
444363	2005 XZ_{50}	—	December 2, 2005	Kitt Peak	Spacewatch	·	2.1 km	MPC · JPL
444364	2005 XA_{58}	—	December 2, 2005	Kitt Peak	Spacewatch	·	850 m	MPC · JPL
444365	2005 XC_{61}	—	December 4, 2005	Kitt Peak	Spacewatch	THM	1.8 km	MPC · JPL
444366	2005 XP_{72}	—	December 6, 2005	Kitt Peak	Spacewatch	·	2.6 km	MPC · JPL
444367	2005 XE_{90}	—	December 8, 2005	Kitt Peak	Spacewatch	·	600 m	MPC · JPL
444368	2005 YD_{2}	—	October 19, 1998	Kitt Peak	Spacewatch	·	560 m	MPC · JPL
444369	2005 YU_{2}	—	December 21, 2005	Catalina	CSS	·	3.7 km	MPC · JPL
444370	2005 YH_{44}	—	December 5, 2005	Kitt Peak	Spacewatch	EOS	2.3 km	MPC · JPL
444371	2005 YE_{62}	—	December 24, 2005	Kitt Peak	Spacewatch	·	3.4 km	MPC · JPL
444372	2005 YW_{65}	—	December 25, 2005	Mount Lemmon	Mount Lemmon Survey	LIX	3.6 km	MPC · JPL
444373	2005 YL_{66}	—	December 25, 2005	Kitt Peak	Spacewatch	·	560 m	MPC · JPL
444374	2005 YZ_{68}	—	December 26, 2005	Kitt Peak	Spacewatch	·	900 m	MPC · JPL
444375	2005 YJ_{69}	—	December 26, 2005	Kitt Peak	Spacewatch	·	2.3 km	MPC · JPL
444376	2005 YA_{71}	—	November 29, 2005	Mount Lemmon	Mount Lemmon Survey	·	3.7 km	MPC · JPL
444377	2005 YL_{83}	—	December 24, 2005	Kitt Peak	Spacewatch	·	720 m	MPC · JPL
444378	2005 YU_{87}	—	December 2, 2005	Mount Lemmon	Mount Lemmon Survey	·	2.2 km	MPC · JPL
444379	2005 YO_{92}	—	December 27, 2005	Mount Lemmon	Mount Lemmon Survey	·	600 m	MPC · JPL
444380	2005 YJ_{99}	—	December 28, 2005	Kitt Peak	Spacewatch	·	2.7 km	MPC · JPL
444381	2005 YY_{113}	—	December 25, 2005	Kitt Peak	Spacewatch	·	2.4 km	MPC · JPL
444382	2005 YJ_{114}	—	December 25, 2005	Kitt Peak	Spacewatch	MAS	650 m	MPC · JPL
444383	2005 YN_{119}	—	December 26, 2005	Mount Lemmon	Mount Lemmon Survey	·	3.9 km	MPC · JPL
444384	2005 YT_{125}	—	December 26, 2005	Kitt Peak	Spacewatch	·	2.6 km	MPC · JPL
444385	2005 YT_{134}	—	December 26, 2005	Kitt Peak	Spacewatch	·	850 m	MPC · JPL
444386	2005 YY_{150}	—	December 25, 2005	Kitt Peak	Spacewatch	PHO	970 m	MPC · JPL
444387	2005 YA_{156}	—	November 30, 2005	Mount Lemmon	Mount Lemmon Survey	·	3.8 km	MPC · JPL
444388	2005 YG_{176}	—	December 22, 2005	Kitt Peak	Spacewatch	MAS	640 m	MPC · JPL
444389	2005 YA_{180}	—	December 28, 2005	Mount Lemmon	Mount Lemmon Survey	·	460 m	MPC · JPL
444390	2005 YX_{187}	—	November 30, 2005	Mount Lemmon	Mount Lemmon Survey	ERI	1.2 km	MPC · JPL
444391	2005 YS_{190}	—	December 30, 2005	Kitt Peak	Spacewatch	·	690 m	MPC · JPL
444392	2005 YS_{201}	—	December 24, 2005	Kitt Peak	Spacewatch	·	1.9 km	MPC · JPL
444393	2005 YC_{238}	—	November 28, 2005	Mount Lemmon	Mount Lemmon Survey	·	890 m	MPC · JPL
444394	2005 YW_{245}	—	December 1, 2005	Mount Lemmon	Mount Lemmon Survey	·	2.9 km	MPC · JPL
444395	2005 YR_{247}	—	December 30, 2005	Kitt Peak	Spacewatch	THM	2.4 km	MPC · JPL
444396	2005 YU_{253}	—	December 29, 2005	Kitt Peak	Spacewatch	·	3.0 km	MPC · JPL
444397	2005 YL_{276}	—	December 10, 2005	Kitt Peak	Spacewatch	·	3.0 km	MPC · JPL
444398	2005 YC_{280}	—	December 25, 2005	Kitt Peak	Spacewatch	·	550 m	MPC · JPL
444399	2005 YP_{282}	—	December 26, 2005	Mount Lemmon	Mount Lemmon Survey	·	1.4 km	MPC · JPL
444400	2005 YH_{286}	—	December 30, 2005	Kitt Peak	Spacewatch	THM	1.6 km	MPC · JPL

== 444401–444500 ==
back to top

Designation			Discovery			Properties		Ref
Permanent	Provisional	Named after	Date	Site	Discoverer(s)	Category	Diam.	Ref
444401	2005 YU_{286}	—	December 6, 2005	Kitt Peak	Spacewatch	·	820 m	MPC · JPL
444402	2006 AE_{8}	—	January 7, 2006	Anderson Mesa	LONEOS	·	4.7 km	MPC · JPL
444403	2006 AK_{30}	—	January 2, 2006	Mount Lemmon	Mount Lemmon Survey	·	610 m	MPC · JPL
444404	2006 AO_{31}	—	January 5, 2006	Catalina	CSS	·	3.7 km	MPC · JPL
444405	2006 AV_{31}	—	January 5, 2006	Catalina	CSS	TIR	2.7 km	MPC · JPL
444406	2006 AO_{35}	—	December 25, 2005	Mount Lemmon	Mount Lemmon Survey	·	720 m	MPC · JPL
444407	2006 AR_{35}	—	January 4, 2006	Mount Lemmon	Mount Lemmon Survey	MAS	590 m	MPC · JPL
444408	2006 AL_{40}	—	January 5, 2006	Mount Lemmon	Mount Lemmon Survey	·	2.8 km	MPC · JPL
444409	2006 AY_{46}	—	January 6, 2006	Kitt Peak	Spacewatch	·	720 m	MPC · JPL
444410	2006 AD_{49}	—	December 2, 2005	Kitt Peak	Spacewatch	·	4.1 km	MPC · JPL
444411 Lutherbeegle	2006 AR_{51}	Lutherbeegle	December 25, 2005	Mount Lemmon	Mount Lemmon Survey	·	1.0 km	MPC · JPL
444412	2006 AQ_{53}	—	January 5, 2006	Kitt Peak	Spacewatch	V	610 m	MPC · JPL
444413	2006 AH_{55}	—	January 5, 2006	Kitt Peak	Spacewatch	V	540 m	MPC · JPL
444414 Mikehankey	2006 AQ_{56}	Mikehankey	December 29, 2005	Mount Lemmon	Mount Lemmon Survey	·	4.3 km	MPC · JPL
444415	2006 AK_{65}	—	January 8, 2006	Kitt Peak	Spacewatch	·	1.2 km	MPC · JPL
444416	2006 BQ_{8}	—	January 23, 2006	Kitt Peak	Spacewatch	H	590 m	MPC · JPL
444417	2006 BP_{13}	—	December 30, 2005	Kitt Peak	Spacewatch	HYG	2.6 km	MPC · JPL
444418 Rohitbhartia	2006 BM_{30}	Rohitbhartia	November 25, 2005	Mount Lemmon	Mount Lemmon Survey	·	4.2 km	MPC · JPL
444419 Francismccubbin	2006 BR_{34}	Francismccubbin	January 10, 2006	Mount Lemmon	Mount Lemmon Survey	·	2.0 km	MPC · JPL
444420	2006 BQ_{35}	—	January 23, 2006	Kitt Peak	Spacewatch	·	860 m	MPC · JPL
444421	2006 BC_{39}	—	January 24, 2006	Socorro	LINEAR	·	850 m	MPC · JPL
444422	2006 BJ_{49}	—	January 25, 2006	Kitt Peak	Spacewatch	MAS	640 m	MPC · JPL
444423	2006 BE_{57}	—	January 23, 2006	Kitt Peak	Spacewatch	·	1.2 km	MPC · JPL
444424	2006 BM_{65}	—	January 23, 2006	Kitt Peak	Spacewatch	MAS	650 m	MPC · JPL
444425	2006 BV_{65}	—	January 23, 2006	Kitt Peak	Spacewatch	·	780 m	MPC · JPL
444426	2006 BC_{79}	—	January 23, 2006	Kitt Peak	Spacewatch	·	1.9 km	MPC · JPL
444427	2006 BN_{87}	—	January 25, 2006	Kitt Peak	Spacewatch	·	830 m	MPC · JPL
444428	2006 BN_{137}	—	January 28, 2006	Mount Lemmon	Mount Lemmon Survey	NYS	650 m	MPC · JPL
444429	2006 BE_{140}	—	January 21, 2006	Mount Lemmon	Mount Lemmon Survey	NYS	1.0 km	MPC · JPL
444430	2006 BD_{144}	—	January 23, 2006	Catalina	CSS	·	2.6 km	MPC · JPL
444431	2006 BV_{168}	—	January 26, 2006	Mount Lemmon	Mount Lemmon Survey	·	1.2 km	MPC · JPL
444432	2006 BF_{179}	—	January 27, 2006	Mount Lemmon	Mount Lemmon Survey	·	910 m	MPC · JPL
444433	2006 BE_{180}	—	January 27, 2006	Mount Lemmon	Mount Lemmon Survey	·	1.3 km	MPC · JPL
444434	2006 BU_{184}	—	January 28, 2006	Mount Lemmon	Mount Lemmon Survey	·	610 m	MPC · JPL
444435	2006 BK_{194}	—	January 30, 2006	Kitt Peak	Spacewatch	T_{j} (2.98)	4.4 km	MPC · JPL
444436	2006 BF_{205}	—	January 31, 2006	Kitt Peak	Spacewatch	·	2.6 km	MPC · JPL
444437	2006 BJ_{228}	—	January 31, 2006	Kitt Peak	Spacewatch	NYS	1.2 km	MPC · JPL
444438	2006 BM_{228}	—	January 31, 2006	Kitt Peak	Spacewatch	LIX	2.7 km	MPC · JPL
444439	2006 BK_{247}	—	December 25, 2005	Mount Lemmon	Mount Lemmon Survey	·	1.1 km	MPC · JPL
444440	2006 BO_{247}	—	January 31, 2006	Kitt Peak	Spacewatch	MAS	620 m	MPC · JPL
444441	2006 BN_{264}	—	January 31, 2006	Kitt Peak	Spacewatch	·	1.2 km	MPC · JPL
444442	2006 BC_{282}	—	January 31, 2006	Kitt Peak	Spacewatch	NYS	900 m	MPC · JPL
444443	2006 CV_{11}	—	February 1, 2006	Kitt Peak	Spacewatch	·	880 m	MPC · JPL
444444	2006 CL_{67}	—	February 4, 2006	Mount Lemmon	Mount Lemmon Survey	NYS	1.0 km	MPC · JPL
444445	2006 DB_{22}	—	January 25, 2006	Kitt Peak	Spacewatch	V	580 m	MPC · JPL
444446	2006 DH_{45}	—	January 6, 2006	Catalina	CSS	H	560 m	MPC · JPL
444447	2006 DR_{80}	—	February 24, 2006	Kitt Peak	Spacewatch	·	3.4 km	MPC · JPL
444448	2006 DY_{127}	—	February 4, 2006	Kitt Peak	Spacewatch	·	3.2 km	MPC · JPL
444449	2006 DS_{137}	—	February 25, 2006	Kitt Peak	Spacewatch	·	1.3 km	MPC · JPL
444450	2006 DS_{149}	—	February 25, 2006	Kitt Peak	Spacewatch	·	1.0 km	MPC · JPL
444451	2006 DT_{151}	—	February 25, 2006	Kitt Peak	Spacewatch	·	1.2 km	MPC · JPL
444452	2006 DG_{183}	—	February 27, 2006	Kitt Peak	Spacewatch	H	460 m	MPC · JPL
444453	2006 DK_{192}	—	February 27, 2006	Kitt Peak	Spacewatch	·	2.3 km	MPC · JPL
444454	2006 DK_{199}	—	February 23, 2006	Anderson Mesa	LONEOS	H	640 m	MPC · JPL
444455	2006 DG_{206}	—	February 25, 2006	Mount Lemmon	Mount Lemmon Survey	·	770 m	MPC · JPL
444456	2006 EK_{6}	—	March 2, 2006	Kitt Peak	Spacewatch	MAS	540 m	MPC · JPL
444457	2006 EB_{21}	—	March 3, 2006	Kitt Peak	Spacewatch	·	2.0 km	MPC · JPL
444458	2006 EH_{21}	—	March 3, 2006	Kitt Peak	Spacewatch	MAS	680 m	MPC · JPL
444459	2006 EJ_{37}	—	March 3, 2006	Kitt Peak	Spacewatch	H	480 m	MPC · JPL
444460	2006 EB_{48}	—	March 4, 2006	Kitt Peak	Spacewatch	THB	3.8 km	MPC · JPL
444461	2006 EV_{66}	—	March 8, 2006	Kitt Peak	Spacewatch	·	1.6 km	MPC · JPL
444462	2006 EC_{68}	—	March 2, 2006	Kitt Peak	M. W. Buie	CLA	1.3 km	MPC · JPL
444463	2006 EY_{72}	—	March 2, 2006	Kitt Peak	Spacewatch	·	970 m	MPC · JPL
444464	2006 FU_{10}	—	January 31, 2006	Catalina	CSS	THB	2.9 km	MPC · JPL
444465	2006 FA_{21}	—	January 22, 2006	Catalina	CSS	H	530 m	MPC · JPL
444466	2006 GL_{31}	—	April 2, 2006	Kitt Peak	Spacewatch	H	610 m	MPC · JPL
444467	2006 HS_{57}	—	April 20, 2006	Kitt Peak	Spacewatch	H	590 m	MPC · JPL
444468	2006 HJ_{58}	—	April 27, 2006	Socorro	LINEAR	·	2.1 km	MPC · JPL
444469	2006 JG_{4}	—	May 2, 2006	Mount Lemmon	Mount Lemmon Survey	·	1.2 km	MPC · JPL
444470	2006 KJ_{26}	—	May 20, 2006	Kitt Peak	Spacewatch	·	1.2 km	MPC · JPL
444471	2006 KX_{58}	—	May 22, 2006	Kitt Peak	Spacewatch	EUN	960 m	MPC · JPL
444472	2006 KD_{103}	—	May 29, 2006	Socorro	LINEAR	·	1.3 km	MPC · JPL
444473	2006 KB_{105}	—	May 28, 2006	Kitt Peak	Spacewatch	·	1.0 km	MPC · JPL
444474	2006 KL_{142}	—	May 25, 2006	Mauna Kea	P. A. Wiegert	·	800 m	MPC · JPL
444475	2006 PD_{2}	—	August 12, 2006	Palomar	NEAT	EUN	1.6 km	MPC · JPL
444476	2006 PV_{17}	—	August 15, 2006	Palomar	NEAT	·	2.6 km	MPC · JPL
444477	2006 PE_{28}	—	July 18, 2006	Siding Spring	SSS	JUN	1.1 km	MPC · JPL
444478	2006 QN_{51}	—	August 23, 2006	Palomar	NEAT	·	1.6 km	MPC · JPL
444479	2006 QT_{71}	—	August 21, 2006	Kitt Peak	Spacewatch	·	1.2 km	MPC · JPL
444480	2006 QL_{89}	—	August 28, 2006	La Sagra	OAM	526	2.4 km	MPC · JPL
444481	2006 QG_{105}	—	August 28, 2006	Catalina	CSS	EUN	1.1 km	MPC · JPL
444482	2006 QK_{118}	—	August 21, 2006	Kitt Peak	Spacewatch	·	2.4 km	MPC · JPL
444483	2006 QY_{118}	—	May 8, 2006	Mount Lemmon	Mount Lemmon Survey	·	1.4 km	MPC · JPL
444484	2006 QV_{144}	—	August 29, 2006	Anderson Mesa	LONEOS	·	1.8 km	MPC · JPL
444485	2006 QY_{144}	—	August 29, 2006	Catalina	CSS	·	1.7 km	MPC · JPL
444486	2006 QU_{147}	—	May 8, 2005	Kitt Peak	Spacewatch	NEM	1.9 km	MPC · JPL
444487	2006 QW_{157}	—	August 19, 2006	Kitt Peak	Spacewatch	(5)	1.4 km	MPC · JPL
444488	2006 QJ_{185}	—	August 28, 2006	Kitt Peak	Spacewatch	HOF	2.2 km	MPC · JPL
444489	2006 QZ_{186}	—	August 28, 2006	Catalina	CSS	·	2.1 km	MPC · JPL
444490	2006 RT_{2}	—	September 12, 2006	Socorro	LINEAR	JUN	1.3 km	MPC · JPL
444491	2006 RY_{3}	—	September 12, 2006	Catalina	CSS	·	1.7 km	MPC · JPL
444492	2006 RR_{17}	—	August 29, 2006	Anderson Mesa	LONEOS	JUN	1.2 km	MPC · JPL
444493	2006 RE_{20}	—	September 15, 2006	Kitt Peak	Spacewatch	·	1.6 km	MPC · JPL
444494	2006 RY_{20}	—	September 15, 2006	Kitt Peak	Spacewatch	·	1.4 km	MPC · JPL
444495	2006 RQ_{22}	—	September 15, 2006	Goodricke-Pigott	R. A. Tucker	·	1.9 km	MPC · JPL
444496	2006 RL_{32}	—	September 15, 2006	Kitt Peak	Spacewatch	WIT	900 m	MPC · JPL
444497	2006 RT_{41}	—	September 14, 2006	Kitt Peak	Spacewatch	HOF · fast?	2.2 km	MPC · JPL
444498	2006 RG_{53}	—	September 14, 2006	Kitt Peak	Spacewatch	·	2.1 km	MPC · JPL
444499	2006 RW_{54}	—	September 14, 2006	Kitt Peak	Spacewatch	·	1.8 km	MPC · JPL
444500	2006 RJ_{57}	—	November 5, 2002	Socorro	LINEAR	·	1.3 km	MPC · JPL

== 444501–444600 ==
back to top

Designation			Discovery			Properties		Ref
Permanent	Provisional	Named after	Date	Site	Discoverer(s)	Category	Diam.	Ref
444501	2006 RQ_{70}	—	September 15, 2006	Kitt Peak	Spacewatch	·	1.4 km	MPC · JPL
444502	2006 RU_{79}	—	September 15, 2006	Kitt Peak	Spacewatch	NEM	2.1 km	MPC · JPL
444503	2006 RZ_{80}	—	September 15, 2006	Kitt Peak	Spacewatch	·	2.2 km	MPC · JPL
444504	2006 RM_{87}	—	September 15, 2006	Kitt Peak	Spacewatch	·	1.4 km	MPC · JPL
444505	2006 RT_{93}	—	September 15, 2006	Kitt Peak	Spacewatch	AGN	1.1 km	MPC · JPL
444506	2006 SA_{2}	—	September 16, 2006	Catalina	CSS	EUN	1.3 km	MPC · JPL
444507	2006 SY_{13}	—	September 17, 2006	Kitt Peak	Spacewatch	·	1.5 km	MPC · JPL
444508	2006 SN_{26}	—	September 16, 2006	Catalina	CSS	·	2.3 km	MPC · JPL
444509	2006 ST_{26}	—	August 29, 2006	Kitt Peak	Spacewatch	CLO	1.3 km	MPC · JPL
444510	2006 SZ_{33}	—	September 17, 2006	Catalina	CSS	·	2.1 km	MPC · JPL
444511	2006 SG_{34}	—	September 17, 2006	Catalina	CSS	EUN	1.6 km	MPC · JPL
444512	2006 SH_{54}	—	September 17, 2006	Catalina	CSS	·	2.5 km	MPC · JPL
444513	2006 SE_{55}	—	September 18, 2006	Catalina	CSS	·	1.7 km	MPC · JPL
444514	2006 SB_{63}	—	September 18, 2006	Catalina	CSS	·	1.6 km	MPC · JPL
444515	2006 SL_{65}	—	September 17, 2006	Kitt Peak	Spacewatch	·	1.9 km	MPC · JPL
444516	2006 SW_{65}	—	August 29, 2006	Catalina	CSS	·	1.6 km	MPC · JPL
444517	2006 SW_{68}	—	September 19, 2006	Kitt Peak	Spacewatch	AGN	1.0 km	MPC · JPL
444518	2006 SD_{79}	—	September 17, 2006	Catalina	CSS	·	2.3 km	MPC · JPL
444519	2006 SH_{81}	—	September 18, 2006	Kitt Peak	Spacewatch	·	1.4 km	MPC · JPL
444520	2006 SR_{90}	—	September 18, 2006	Kitt Peak	Spacewatch	AGN	1.2 km	MPC · JPL
444521	2006 SP_{92}	—	September 18, 2006	Kitt Peak	Spacewatch	·	1.7 km	MPC · JPL
444522	2006 SE_{98}	—	September 18, 2006	Kitt Peak	Spacewatch	·	1.8 km	MPC · JPL
444523	2006 SF_{98}	—	September 18, 2006	Kitt Peak	Spacewatch	·	1.7 km	MPC · JPL
444524	2006 SY_{107}	—	September 19, 2006	Catalina	CSS	·	2.3 km	MPC · JPL
444525	2006 SW_{114}	—	September 24, 2006	Kitt Peak	Spacewatch	·	1.5 km	MPC · JPL
444526	2006 SA_{116}	—	September 24, 2006	Anderson Mesa	LONEOS	·	2.1 km	MPC · JPL
444527	2006 SP_{130}	—	July 21, 2006	Mount Lemmon	Mount Lemmon Survey	·	1.9 km	MPC · JPL
444528	2006 SN_{148}	—	September 19, 2006	Kitt Peak	Spacewatch	PAD	1.4 km	MPC · JPL
444529	2006 SL_{149}	—	September 19, 2006	Kitt Peak	Spacewatch	·	1.5 km	MPC · JPL
444530	2006 SV_{156}	—	September 23, 2006	Kitt Peak	Spacewatch	·	1.6 km	MPC · JPL
444531	2006 SR_{163}	—	September 24, 2006	Kitt Peak	Spacewatch	AST	1.4 km	MPC · JPL
444532	2006 SD_{165}	—	September 25, 2006	Kitt Peak	Spacewatch	·	1.6 km	MPC · JPL
444533	2006 SA_{169}	—	September 25, 2006	Kitt Peak	Spacewatch	·	1.9 km	MPC · JPL
444534	2006 SX_{179}	—	September 25, 2006	Kitt Peak	Spacewatch	·	1.5 km	MPC · JPL
444535	2006 SB_{182}	—	September 25, 2006	Anderson Mesa	LONEOS	·	1.4 km	MPC · JPL
444536	2006 SM_{185}	—	September 25, 2006	Kitt Peak	Spacewatch	·	1.6 km	MPC · JPL
444537	2006 SF_{199}	—	September 15, 2006	Kitt Peak	Spacewatch	HOF	2.1 km	MPC · JPL
444538	2006 SR_{207}	—	August 30, 2006	Anderson Mesa	LONEOS	·	2.3 km	MPC · JPL
444539	2006 SV_{220}	—	August 28, 2006	Kitt Peak	Spacewatch	AGN	920 m	MPC · JPL
444540	2006 SW_{229}	—	September 26, 2006	Kitt Peak	Spacewatch	·	1.4 km	MPC · JPL
444541	2006 SC_{242}	—	September 18, 2006	Kitt Peak	Spacewatch	NEM	2.0 km	MPC · JPL
444542	2006 SZ_{246}	—	September 15, 2006	Kitt Peak	Spacewatch	·	1.6 km	MPC · JPL
444543	2006 SU_{249}	—	September 26, 2006	Kitt Peak	Spacewatch	·	2.0 km	MPC · JPL
444544	2006 SS_{257}	—	September 26, 2006	Kitt Peak	Spacewatch	·	1.6 km	MPC · JPL
444545	2006 SR_{262}	—	September 26, 2006	Mount Lemmon	Mount Lemmon Survey	·	1.5 km	MPC · JPL
444546	2006 SK_{265}	—	September 26, 2006	Kitt Peak	Spacewatch	·	2.1 km	MPC · JPL
444547	2006 ST_{266}	—	September 26, 2006	Kitt Peak	Spacewatch	·	1.8 km	MPC · JPL
444548	2006 SM_{294}	—	September 25, 2006	Kitt Peak	Spacewatch	·	1.3 km	MPC · JPL
444549	2006 SB_{298}	—	September 14, 2006	Kitt Peak	Spacewatch	·	1.6 km	MPC · JPL
444550	2006 SQ_{299}	—	March 23, 2004	Kitt Peak	Spacewatch	·	1.5 km	MPC · JPL
444551	2006 SO_{306}	—	September 27, 2006	Mount Lemmon	Mount Lemmon Survey	·	1.5 km	MPC · JPL
444552	2006 SU_{307}	—	September 27, 2006	Kitt Peak	Spacewatch	·	1.9 km	MPC · JPL
444553	2006 SR_{317}	—	September 27, 2006	Kitt Peak	Spacewatch	·	1.7 km	MPC · JPL
444554	2006 SW_{325}	—	September 19, 2006	Kitt Peak	Spacewatch	AGN	880 m	MPC · JPL
444555	2006 SF_{329}	—	September 27, 2006	Kitt Peak	Spacewatch	·	1.7 km	MPC · JPL
444556	2006 SQ_{334}	—	September 28, 2006	Kitt Peak	Spacewatch	·	2.3 km	MPC · JPL
444557	2006 SR_{336}	—	September 14, 2006	Kitt Peak	Spacewatch	·	1.9 km	MPC · JPL
444558	2006 SX_{341}	—	September 28, 2006	Kitt Peak	Spacewatch	MRX	880 m	MPC · JPL
444559	2006 SO_{345}	—	September 28, 2006	Kitt Peak	Spacewatch	·	2.1 km	MPC · JPL
444560	2006 SX_{345}	—	September 28, 2006	Kitt Peak	Spacewatch	·	2.6 km	MPC · JPL
444561	2006 SN_{367}	—	September 26, 2006	Catalina	CSS	·	2.2 km	MPC · JPL
444562 Visaginas	2006 SP_{368}	Visaginas	September 25, 2006	Moletai	K. Černis, J. Zdanavičius	·	3.1 km	MPC · JPL
444563	2006 SU_{401}	—	September 30, 2006	Mount Lemmon	Mount Lemmon Survey	·	1.9 km	MPC · JPL
444564	2006 SW_{407}	—	September 25, 2006	Kitt Peak	Spacewatch	·	1.5 km	MPC · JPL
444565	2006 TG_{19}	—	October 11, 2006	Kitt Peak	Spacewatch	·	1.9 km	MPC · JPL
444566	2006 TY_{19}	—	September 28, 2006	Mount Lemmon	Mount Lemmon Survey	·	1.5 km	MPC · JPL
444567	2006 TX_{30}	—	October 12, 2006	Kitt Peak	Spacewatch	·	1.9 km	MPC · JPL
444568	2006 TH_{33}	—	October 12, 2006	Kitt Peak	Spacewatch	·	1.7 km	MPC · JPL
444569	2006 TE_{47}	—	October 12, 2006	Kitt Peak	Spacewatch	AGN	1.1 km	MPC · JPL
444570	2006 TD_{54}	—	October 12, 2006	Kitt Peak	Spacewatch	·	2.2 km	MPC · JPL
444571	2006 TZ_{65}	—	September 18, 2006	Kitt Peak	Spacewatch	·	1.6 km	MPC · JPL
444572	2006 TJ_{67}	—	September 18, 2006	Catalina	CSS	·	2.0 km	MPC · JPL
444573	2006 TB_{70}	—	October 11, 2006	Palomar	NEAT	·	2.8 km	MPC · JPL
444574	2006 TC_{70}	—	October 11, 2006	Palomar	NEAT	·	2.8 km	MPC · JPL
444575	2006 TK_{71}	—	October 11, 2006	Palomar	NEAT	·	1.9 km	MPC · JPL
444576	2006 TE_{73}	—	October 11, 2006	Palomar	NEAT	·	2.2 km	MPC · JPL
444577	2006 TD_{84}	—	October 13, 2006	Kitt Peak	Spacewatch	MRX	890 m	MPC · JPL
444578	2006 TG_{93}	—	October 2, 2006	Mount Lemmon	Mount Lemmon Survey	(13314)	1.7 km	MPC · JPL
444579	2006 TN_{97}	—	October 13, 2006	Kitt Peak	Spacewatch	·	1.8 km	MPC · JPL
444580	2006 TU_{100}	—	October 15, 2006	Kitt Peak	Spacewatch	·	1.8 km	MPC · JPL
444581	2006 TC_{104}	—	September 26, 2006	Mount Lemmon	Mount Lemmon Survey	GEF	1.3 km	MPC · JPL
444582	2006 TX_{105}	—	October 9, 2006	Palomar	NEAT	·	2.3 km	MPC · JPL
444583	2006 TH_{122}	—	October 2, 2006	Mount Lemmon	Mount Lemmon Survey	·	1.9 km	MPC · JPL
444584	2006 UK	—	October 17, 2006	Kitt Peak	Spacewatch	APO · PHA	320 m	MPC · JPL
444585	2006 UU_{18}	—	September 26, 2006	Kitt Peak	Spacewatch	·	2.0 km	MPC · JPL
444586	2006 UA_{21}	—	September 18, 2006	Kitt Peak	Spacewatch	HOF	2.4 km	MPC · JPL
444587	2006 UN_{26}	—	October 16, 2006	Kitt Peak	Spacewatch	·	1.4 km	MPC · JPL
444588	2006 UN_{39}	—	October 16, 2006	Kitt Peak	Spacewatch	·	1.4 km	MPC · JPL
444589	2006 UF_{52}	—	October 17, 2006	Mount Lemmon	Mount Lemmon Survey	KOR	1.2 km	MPC · JPL
444590	2006 UQ_{78}	—	October 17, 2006	Kitt Peak	Spacewatch	·	1.9 km	MPC · JPL
444591	2006 UA_{80}	—	October 17, 2006	Mount Lemmon	Mount Lemmon Survey	·	2.4 km	MPC · JPL
444592	2006 UW_{81}	—	October 17, 2006	Mount Lemmon	Mount Lemmon Survey	·	1.6 km	MPC · JPL
444593	2006 UX_{112}	—	September 28, 2006	Kitt Peak	Spacewatch	·	1.6 km	MPC · JPL
444594	2006 UQ_{121}	—	September 18, 2006	Kitt Peak	Spacewatch	HOF	2.1 km	MPC · JPL
444595	2006 UA_{123}	—	October 19, 2006	Kitt Peak	Spacewatch	·	1.3 km	MPC · JPL
444596	2006 UD_{129}	—	October 19, 2006	Kitt Peak	Spacewatch	·	1.7 km	MPC · JPL
444597	2006 UU_{141}	—	October 19, 2006	Kitt Peak	Spacewatch	·	1.8 km	MPC · JPL
444598	2006 UC_{148}	—	August 18, 2006	Kitt Peak	Spacewatch	·	1.7 km	MPC · JPL
444599	2006 UP_{155}	—	October 21, 2006	Catalina	CSS	·	1.8 km	MPC · JPL
444600	2006 UV_{205}	—	September 24, 2006	Kitt Peak	Spacewatch	AST	1.8 km	MPC · JPL

== 444601–444700 ==
back to top

Designation			Discovery			Properties		Ref
Permanent	Provisional	Named after	Date	Site	Discoverer(s)	Category	Diam.	Ref
444601	2006 UD_{212}	—	October 23, 2006	Kitt Peak	Spacewatch	·	1.9 km	MPC · JPL
444602	2006 UB_{218}	—	October 2, 2006	Mount Lemmon	Mount Lemmon Survey	·	1.8 km	MPC · JPL
444603	2006 UQ_{222}	—	October 17, 2006	Mount Lemmon	Mount Lemmon Survey	·	2.5 km	MPC · JPL
444604	2006 UT_{226}	—	September 26, 2006	Mount Lemmon	Mount Lemmon Survey	·	2.5 km	MPC · JPL
444605	2006 UP_{248}	—	October 4, 2006	Mount Lemmon	Mount Lemmon Survey	·	1.7 km	MPC · JPL
444606	2006 UJ_{254}	—	October 20, 2006	Kitt Peak	Spacewatch	KOR	1.0 km	MPC · JPL
444607	2006 UL_{270}	—	October 27, 2006	Mount Lemmon	Mount Lemmon Survey	·	2.5 km	MPC · JPL
444608	2006 UU_{274}	—	September 14, 2006	Kitt Peak	Spacewatch	·	1.7 km	MPC · JPL
444609	2006 UF_{288}	—	October 29, 2006	Mount Lemmon	Mount Lemmon Survey	·	2.8 km	MPC · JPL
444610	2006 US_{295}	—	October 19, 2006	Kitt Peak	M. W. Buie	·	1.4 km	MPC · JPL
444611	2006 UH_{329}	—	October 22, 2006	Catalina	CSS	·	2.7 km	MPC · JPL
444612	2006 UN_{336}	—	October 21, 2006	Mount Lemmon	Mount Lemmon Survey	·	2.2 km	MPC · JPL
444613	2006 VQ_{1}	—	November 1, 2006	Charleston	Astronomical Research Observatory	·	2.4 km	MPC · JPL
444614	2006 VF_{12}	—	October 21, 2006	Mount Lemmon	Mount Lemmon Survey	·	1.7 km	MPC · JPL
444615	2006 VT_{24}	—	November 10, 2006	Kitt Peak	Spacewatch	·	2.0 km	MPC · JPL
444616	2006 VT_{29}	—	November 10, 2006	Kitt Peak	Spacewatch	·	2.2 km	MPC · JPL
444617	2006 VG_{45}	—	November 9, 2006	Altschwendt	W. Ries	·	1.9 km	MPC · JPL
444618	2006 VR_{61}	—	November 11, 2006	Kitt Peak	Spacewatch	·	780 m	MPC · JPL
444619	2006 VW_{82}	—	November 13, 2006	Kitt Peak	Spacewatch	HOF	2.8 km	MPC · JPL
444620	2006 VT_{88}	—	October 23, 2006	Kitt Peak	Spacewatch	HOF	2.4 km	MPC · JPL
444621	2006 VU_{100}	—	November 11, 2006	Catalina	CSS	·	3.5 km	MPC · JPL
444622	2006 VR_{107}	—	September 30, 2006	Catalina	CSS	·	2.3 km	MPC · JPL
444623	2006 VJ_{154}	—	October 17, 2006	Kitt Peak	Spacewatch	·	2.0 km	MPC · JPL
444624	2006 VJ_{170}	—	November 13, 2006	Catalina	CSS	·	3.1 km	MPC · JPL
444625	2006 VU_{170}	—	November 1, 2006	Mount Lemmon	Mount Lemmon Survey	·	2.4 km	MPC · JPL
444626	2006 VV_{172}	—	October 2, 2006	Mount Lemmon	Mount Lemmon Survey	(18466)	1.9 km	MPC · JPL
444627	2006 WU	—	November 17, 2006	Mount Lemmon	Mount Lemmon Survey	AMO	540 m	MPC · JPL
444628	2006 WQ_{1}	—	November 18, 2006	Catalina	CSS	AMO	450 m	MPC · JPL
444629	2006 WD_{30}	—	November 18, 2006	Pla D'Arguines	R. Ferrando	·	2.8 km	MPC · JPL
444630	2006 WH_{39}	—	November 16, 2006	Kitt Peak	Spacewatch	·	2.3 km	MPC · JPL
444631	2006 WL_{51}	—	November 16, 2006	Kitt Peak	Spacewatch	EOS	1.9 km	MPC · JPL
444632	2006 WX_{69}	—	November 18, 2006	Kitt Peak	Spacewatch	·	1.6 km	MPC · JPL
444633	2006 WL_{71}	—	November 18, 2006	Kitt Peak	Spacewatch	AGN	1.2 km	MPC · JPL
444634	2006 WZ_{102}	—	November 19, 2006	Kitt Peak	Spacewatch	KOR	1.2 km	MPC · JPL
444635	2006 WU_{133}	—	November 18, 2006	Mount Lemmon	Mount Lemmon Survey	·	1.8 km	MPC · JPL
444636	2006 WB_{140}	—	November 19, 2006	Socorro	LINEAR	·	2.4 km	MPC · JPL
444637	2006 WZ_{155}	—	November 22, 2006	Kitt Peak	Spacewatch	AGN	1.3 km	MPC · JPL
444638	2006 WG_{189}	—	November 25, 2006	Socorro	LINEAR	·	2.2 km	MPC · JPL
444639	2006 WP_{205}	—	November 24, 2006	Kitt Peak	Spacewatch	KOR	1.4 km	MPC · JPL
444640	2006 XQ_{3}	—	October 17, 2006	Catalina	CSS	·	2.2 km	MPC · JPL
444641	2006 XU_{37}	—	December 11, 2006	Kitt Peak	Spacewatch	·	2.2 km	MPC · JPL
444642	2006 XO_{59}	—	December 14, 2006	Kitt Peak	Spacewatch	·	2.8 km	MPC · JPL
444643	2006 YW_{10}	—	December 21, 2006	Mount Lemmon	Mount Lemmon Survey	·	2.0 km	MPC · JPL
444644	2006 YZ_{31}	—	December 21, 2006	Mount Lemmon	Mount Lemmon Survey	EOS	2.1 km	MPC · JPL
444645	2006 YJ_{52}	—	December 21, 2006	Kitt Peak	Spacewatch	EOS	1.8 km	MPC · JPL
444646	2006 YQ_{52}	—	December 17, 2006	Mount Lemmon	Mount Lemmon Survey	·	760 m	MPC · JPL
444647	2006 YW_{53}	—	December 27, 2006	Mount Lemmon	Mount Lemmon Survey	·	600 m	MPC · JPL
444648	2007 BR_{9}	—	January 17, 2007	Kitt Peak	Spacewatch	·	3.0 km	MPC · JPL
444649	2007 BV_{9}	—	January 17, 2007	Kitt Peak	Spacewatch	·	2.5 km	MPC · JPL
444650	2007 BL_{13}	—	January 17, 2007	Kitt Peak	Spacewatch	·	2.1 km	MPC · JPL
444651	2007 BY_{15}	—	January 17, 2007	Kitt Peak	Spacewatch	·	2.3 km	MPC · JPL
444652	2007 BO_{21}	—	January 24, 2007	Socorro	LINEAR	·	2.9 km	MPC · JPL
444653	2007 BP_{26}	—	January 24, 2007	Mount Lemmon	Mount Lemmon Survey	·	760 m	MPC · JPL
444654	2007 BZ_{65}	—	January 27, 2007	Mount Lemmon	Mount Lemmon Survey	·	640 m	MPC · JPL
444655	2007 BA_{71}	—	January 28, 2007	Mount Lemmon	Mount Lemmon Survey	PHO	690 m	MPC · JPL
444656	2007 BP_{78}	—	January 25, 2007	Kitt Peak	Spacewatch	EOS	2.0 km	MPC · JPL
444657	2007 CY_{12}	—	February 6, 2007	Palomar	NEAT	·	730 m	MPC · JPL
444658	2007 CX_{19}	—	February 6, 2007	Palomar	NEAT	·	1.9 km	MPC · JPL
444659	2007 CG_{23}	—	January 27, 2007	Kitt Peak	Spacewatch	·	2.4 km	MPC · JPL
444660	2007 CL_{31}	—	February 6, 2007	Mount Lemmon	Mount Lemmon Survey	·	2.1 km	MPC · JPL
444661	2007 CY_{39}	—	January 27, 2007	Kitt Peak	Spacewatch	EOS	1.7 km	MPC · JPL
444662	2007 CC_{40}	—	February 6, 2007	Mount Lemmon	Mount Lemmon Survey	·	4.4 km	MPC · JPL
444663	2007 CE_{40}	—	February 6, 2007	Mount Lemmon	Mount Lemmon Survey	·	3.6 km	MPC · JPL
444664	2007 CN_{58}	—	January 17, 2007	Catalina	CSS	·	3.6 km	MPC · JPL
444665	2007 CR_{67}	—	February 13, 2007	Mount Lemmon	Mount Lemmon Survey	THM	2.0 km	MPC · JPL
444666	2007 DV_{2}	—	February 8, 2007	Kitt Peak	Spacewatch	HYG	3.1 km	MPC · JPL
444667	2007 DS_{18}	—	February 17, 2007	Kitt Peak	Spacewatch	·	2.7 km	MPC · JPL
444668	2007 DP_{22}	—	September 23, 2005	Kitt Peak	Spacewatch	·	1.8 km	MPC · JPL
444669	2007 DS_{22}	—	February 17, 2007	Kitt Peak	Spacewatch	·	780 m	MPC · JPL
444670	2007 DK_{23}	—	February 17, 2007	Kitt Peak	Spacewatch	HYG	2.8 km	MPC · JPL
444671	2007 DT_{26}	—	January 28, 2007	Mount Lemmon	Mount Lemmon Survey	VER	3.4 km	MPC · JPL
444672	2007 DX_{29}	—	February 17, 2007	Kitt Peak	Spacewatch	·	2.9 km	MPC · JPL
444673	2007 DU_{30}	—	February 17, 2007	Kitt Peak	Spacewatch	·	3.0 km	MPC · JPL
444674	2007 DJ_{32}	—	February 9, 2007	Kitt Peak	Spacewatch	·	3.9 km	MPC · JPL
444675	2007 DS_{42}	—	December 20, 2006	Mount Lemmon	Mount Lemmon Survey	·	740 m	MPC · JPL
444676	2007 DQ_{45}	—	November 21, 2006	Mount Lemmon	Mount Lemmon Survey	EOS	2.0 km	MPC · JPL
444677	2007 DL_{65}	—	February 21, 2007	Kitt Peak	Spacewatch	·	3.0 km	MPC · JPL
444678	2007 DO_{67}	—	March 15, 1997	Kitt Peak	Spacewatch	·	570 m	MPC · JPL
444679	2007 DR_{69}	—	February 21, 2007	Kitt Peak	Spacewatch	·	3.0 km	MPC · JPL
444680	2007 DM_{70}	—	February 21, 2007	Kitt Peak	Spacewatch	·	2.1 km	MPC · JPL
444681	2007 DO_{83}	—	February 25, 2007	Mount Lemmon	Mount Lemmon Survey	·	2.9 km	MPC · JPL
444682	2007 DV_{89}	—	February 23, 2007	Kitt Peak	Spacewatch	·	3.1 km	MPC · JPL
444683	2007 DY_{90}	—	February 23, 2007	Mount Lemmon	Mount Lemmon Survey	TEL	1.3 km	MPC · JPL
444684	2007 DZ_{102}	—	February 17, 2007	Kitt Peak	Spacewatch	·	2.4 km	MPC · JPL
444685	2007 DO_{107}	—	February 22, 2007	Mount Graham	Mount Graham	(1338) (FLO)	590 m	MPC · JPL
444686	2007 DP_{113}	—	February 21, 2007	Kitt Peak	Spacewatch	·	3.2 km	MPC · JPL
444687	2007 DH_{116}	—	February 16, 2007	Catalina	CSS	·	3.6 km	MPC · JPL
444688	2007 EL_{2}	—	February 23, 2007	Mount Lemmon	Mount Lemmon Survey	·	570 m	MPC · JPL
444689	2007 EP_{9}	—	March 9, 2007	Wildberg	R. Apitzsch	EOS	2.0 km	MPC · JPL
444690	2007 EQ_{17}	—	February 23, 2007	Mount Lemmon	Mount Lemmon Survey	·	2.3 km	MPC · JPL
444691	2007 EP_{20}	—	February 17, 2007	Kitt Peak	Spacewatch	·	710 m	MPC · JPL
444692	2007 EK_{32}	—	March 10, 2007	Kitt Peak	Spacewatch	·	1.0 km	MPC · JPL
444693	2007 EM_{33}	—	March 10, 2007	Mount Lemmon	Mount Lemmon Survey	·	3.1 km	MPC · JPL
444694	2007 EQ_{37}	—	March 11, 2007	Mount Lemmon	Mount Lemmon Survey	·	850 m	MPC · JPL
444695	2007 EY_{41}	—	February 23, 2007	Kitt Peak	Spacewatch	·	890 m	MPC · JPL
444696	2007 EB_{56}	—	March 12, 2007	Mount Lemmon	Mount Lemmon Survey	·	3.0 km	MPC · JPL
444697	2007 EX_{67}	—	February 17, 2007	Kitt Peak	Spacewatch	·	2.7 km	MPC · JPL
444698	2007 EX_{69}	—	March 10, 2007	Mount Lemmon	Mount Lemmon Survey	(2076)	940 m	MPC · JPL
444699	2007 EA_{77}	—	March 10, 2007	Mount Lemmon	Mount Lemmon Survey	·	2.8 km	MPC · JPL
444700	2007 EY_{80}	—	February 7, 2007	Mount Lemmon	Mount Lemmon Survey	·	2.3 km	MPC · JPL

== 444701–444800 ==
back to top

Designation			Discovery			Properties		Ref
Permanent	Provisional	Named after	Date	Site	Discoverer(s)	Category	Diam.	Ref
444701	2007 EZ_{81}	—	March 11, 2007	Mount Lemmon	Mount Lemmon Survey	EOS	1.9 km	MPC · JPL
444702	2007 EG_{89}	—	January 28, 2007	Mount Lemmon	Mount Lemmon Survey	HYG	3.1 km	MPC · JPL
444703	2007 EY_{95}	—	March 10, 2007	Mount Lemmon	Mount Lemmon Survey	·	1.1 km	MPC · JPL
444704	2007 EA_{121}	—	February 25, 2007	Mount Lemmon	Mount Lemmon Survey	·	780 m	MPC · JPL
444705	2007 EX_{126}	—	March 9, 2007	Mount Lemmon	Mount Lemmon Survey	·	3.0 km	MPC · JPL
444706	2007 EW_{127}	—	March 9, 2007	Mount Lemmon	Mount Lemmon Survey	·	630 m	MPC · JPL
444707	2007 EA_{132}	—	March 9, 2007	Mount Lemmon	Mount Lemmon Survey	MAS	680 m	MPC · JPL
444708	2007 EJ_{133}	—	March 9, 2007	Mount Lemmon	Mount Lemmon Survey	·	2.4 km	MPC · JPL
444709	2007 EJ_{140}	—	February 17, 2007	Mount Lemmon	Mount Lemmon Survey	EOS	1.6 km	MPC · JPL
444710	2007 EV_{140}	—	March 12, 2007	Kitt Peak	Spacewatch	·	780 m	MPC · JPL
444711	2007 EG_{151}	—	February 26, 2007	Mount Lemmon	Mount Lemmon Survey	·	2.7 km	MPC · JPL
444712	2007 ES_{161}	—	February 6, 2007	Mount Lemmon	Mount Lemmon Survey	·	2.5 km	MPC · JPL
444713	2007 EE_{186}	—	February 23, 2007	Kitt Peak	Spacewatch	EOS	2.0 km	MPC · JPL
444714	2007 EH_{190}	—	March 13, 2007	Mount Lemmon	Mount Lemmon Survey	·	820 m	MPC · JPL
444715	2007 EV_{190}	—	March 13, 2007	Kitt Peak	Spacewatch	MAS	590 m	MPC · JPL
444716	2007 ES_{194}	—	March 15, 2007	Kitt Peak	Spacewatch	·	2.7 km	MPC · JPL
444717	2007 EU_{210}	—	February 9, 2007	Kitt Peak	Spacewatch	·	1.1 km	MPC · JPL
444718	2007 EG_{216}	—	March 13, 2007	Catalina	CSS	·	1.4 km	MPC · JPL
444719	2007 EE_{221}	—	March 13, 2007	Mount Lemmon	Mount Lemmon Survey	·	3.2 km	MPC · JPL
444720	2007 FP	—	March 16, 2007	Mount Lemmon	Mount Lemmon Survey	·	2.9 km	MPC · JPL
444721	2007 FP_{1}	—	February 23, 2007	Kitt Peak	Spacewatch	·	800 m	MPC · JPL
444722	2007 FQ_{6}	—	March 16, 2007	Mount Lemmon	Mount Lemmon Survey	·	2.5 km	MPC · JPL
444723	2007 FA_{16}	—	March 13, 2007	Catalina	CSS	·	790 m	MPC · JPL
444724	2007 FM_{16}	—	March 20, 2007	Mount Lemmon	Mount Lemmon Survey	·	2.2 km	MPC · JPL
444725	2007 FA_{20}	—	March 11, 2007	Mount Lemmon	Mount Lemmon Survey	·	3.1 km	MPC · JPL
444726	2007 FY_{25}	—	February 25, 2007	Kitt Peak	Spacewatch	·	870 m	MPC · JPL
444727	2007 FN_{27}	—	February 23, 2007	Kitt Peak	Spacewatch	VER	2.8 km	MPC · JPL
444728	2007 FO_{47}	—	March 26, 2007	Kitt Peak	Spacewatch	V	580 m	MPC · JPL
444729	2007 FQ_{48}	—	March 26, 2007	Mount Lemmon	Mount Lemmon Survey	·	1.8 km	MPC · JPL
444730	2007 GT_{10}	—	March 11, 2007	Kitt Peak	Spacewatch	·	3.3 km	MPC · JPL
444731	2007 GS_{17}	—	April 11, 2007	Kitt Peak	Spacewatch	·	940 m	MPC · JPL
444732	2007 GC_{29}	—	March 26, 2007	Mount Lemmon	Mount Lemmon Survey	NYS	1.0 km	MPC · JPL
444733	2007 GT_{31}	—	April 15, 2007	Mount Lemmon	Mount Lemmon Survey	·	860 m	MPC · JPL
444734	2007 GG_{46}	—	April 14, 2007	Kitt Peak	Spacewatch	·	4.3 km	MPC · JPL
444735	2007 GB_{70}	—	March 26, 2007	Kitt Peak	Spacewatch	·	930 m	MPC · JPL
444736	2007 HY_{12}	—	April 16, 2007	Catalina	CSS	·	840 m	MPC · JPL
444737	2007 HO_{26}	—	April 18, 2007	Mount Lemmon	Mount Lemmon Survey	MAS	680 m	MPC · JPL
444738	2007 HT_{44}	—	March 13, 2007	Mount Lemmon	Mount Lemmon Survey	·	650 m	MPC · JPL
444739	2007 HE_{48}	—	October 5, 2004	Kitt Peak	Spacewatch	·	1.1 km	MPC · JPL
444740	2007 HM_{74}	—	April 22, 2007	Kitt Peak	Spacewatch	·	1.7 km	MPC · JPL
444741	2007 HU_{88}	—	April 22, 2007	Kitt Peak	Spacewatch	·	4.0 km	MPC · JPL
444742	2007 HJ_{93}	—	March 11, 2007	Kitt Peak	Spacewatch	·	570 m	MPC · JPL
444743	2007 HO_{93}	—	March 16, 2007	Mount Lemmon	Mount Lemmon Survey	VER	2.2 km	MPC · JPL
444744	2007 JP_{40}	—	April 18, 2007	Kitt Peak	Spacewatch	NYS	980 m	MPC · JPL
444745	2007 JF_{43}	—	May 10, 2007	Palomar Mountain	M. E. Schwamb, M. E. Brown, D. Rabinowitz	plutino	406 km	MPC · JPL
444746	2007 LR_{9}	—	May 26, 2007	Mount Lemmon	Mount Lemmon Survey	·	780 m	MPC · JPL
444747	2007 LW_{26}	—	April 26, 2007	Mount Lemmon	Mount Lemmon Survey	·	1.7 km	MPC · JPL
444748	2007 MB_{19}	—	June 21, 2007	Mount Lemmon	Mount Lemmon Survey	·	1.7 km	MPC · JPL
444749	2007 QU_{10}	—	August 23, 2007	Kitt Peak	Spacewatch	·	1.8 km	MPC · JPL
444750	2007 QL_{15}	—	August 24, 2007	Kitt Peak	Spacewatch	·	700 m	MPC · JPL
444751	2007 RZ_{33}	—	September 5, 2007	Catalina	CSS	H	760 m	MPC · JPL
444752	2007 RW_{34}	—	September 6, 2007	Anderson Mesa	LONEOS	H	560 m	MPC · JPL
444753	2007 RP_{37}	—	September 8, 2007	Anderson Mesa	LONEOS	T_{j} (2.99) · 3:2 · SHU	5.1 km	MPC · JPL
444754	2007 RD_{105}	—	September 11, 2007	Mount Lemmon	Mount Lemmon Survey	3:2 · SHU	5.0 km	MPC · JPL
444755	2007 RS_{116}	—	September 11, 2007	Kitt Peak	Spacewatch	·	930 m	MPC · JPL
444756	2007 RP_{132}	—	September 14, 2007	Catalina	CSS	H	590 m	MPC · JPL
444757	2007 RL_{148}	—	September 12, 2007	Catalina	CSS	H	580 m	MPC · JPL
444758	2007 RP_{150}	—	September 15, 2007	Socorro	LINEAR	H	510 m	MPC · JPL
444759	2007 RK_{175}	—	September 10, 2007	Kitt Peak	Spacewatch	EUN	780 m	MPC · JPL
444760	2007 RS_{187}	—	September 13, 2007	Catalina	CSS	·	1.3 km	MPC · JPL
444761	2007 RK_{195}	—	September 12, 2007	Kitt Peak	Spacewatch	·	740 m	MPC · JPL
444762	2007 RC_{220}	—	September 14, 2007	Mount Lemmon	Mount Lemmon Survey	·	1.5 km	MPC · JPL
444763	2007 RN_{227}	—	September 10, 2007	Kitt Peak	Spacewatch	H	510 m	MPC · JPL
444764	2007 RH_{253}	—	September 13, 2007	Mount Lemmon	Mount Lemmon Survey	·	910 m	MPC · JPL
444765	2007 RR_{259}	—	September 14, 2007	Mount Lemmon	Mount Lemmon Survey	·	1.0 km	MPC · JPL
444766	2007 RS_{259}	—	September 14, 2007	Mount Lemmon	Mount Lemmon Survey	·	830 m	MPC · JPL
444767	2007 RT_{262}	—	September 15, 2007	Kitt Peak	Spacewatch	T_{j} (2.99) · 3:2 · SHU	5.0 km	MPC · JPL
444768	2007 RG_{270}	—	September 15, 2007	Mount Lemmon	Mount Lemmon Survey	·	1.7 km	MPC · JPL
444769	2007 RR_{273}	—	September 15, 2007	Kitt Peak	Spacewatch	·	960 m	MPC · JPL
444770	2007 RV_{291}	—	September 12, 2007	Mount Lemmon	Mount Lemmon Survey	·	760 m	MPC · JPL
444771	2007 RX_{308}	—	September 9, 2007	Kitt Peak	Spacewatch	·	960 m	MPC · JPL
444772	2007 RE_{313}	—	September 5, 2007	Mount Lemmon	Mount Lemmon Survey	H	470 m	MPC · JPL
444773	2007 SC_{21}	—	September 18, 2007	Catalina	CSS	T_{j} (2.99) · 3:2	5.4 km	MPC · JPL
444774	2007 TV_{10}	—	October 6, 2007	Socorro	LINEAR	·	1.2 km	MPC · JPL
444775	2007 TM_{16}	—	October 7, 2007	Socorro	LINEAR	·	770 m	MPC · JPL
444776	2007 TR_{23}	—	September 12, 2007	Catalina	CSS	H	630 m	MPC · JPL
444777	2007 TZ_{24}	—	October 11, 2007	Catalina	CSS	H	670 m	MPC · JPL
444778	2007 TY_{32}	—	October 6, 2007	Kitt Peak	Spacewatch	·	1.1 km	MPC · JPL
444779	2007 TP_{36}	—	October 4, 2007	Catalina	CSS	·	900 m	MPC · JPL
444780	2007 TZ_{39}	—	October 6, 2007	Kitt Peak	Spacewatch	·	890 m	MPC · JPL
444781	2007 TP_{46}	—	September 18, 2007	Mount Lemmon	Mount Lemmon Survey	·	1.2 km	MPC · JPL
444782	2007 TC_{59}	—	October 5, 2007	Kitt Peak	Spacewatch	·	1.4 km	MPC · JPL
444783	2007 TQ_{63}	—	October 7, 2007	Mount Lemmon	Mount Lemmon Survey	·	1.0 km	MPC · JPL
444784	2007 TC_{64}	—	October 7, 2007	Mount Lemmon	Mount Lemmon Survey	·	1.2 km	MPC · JPL
444785	2007 TZ_{82}	—	October 8, 2007	Mount Lemmon	Mount Lemmon Survey	·	970 m	MPC · JPL
444786	2007 TL_{85}	—	October 8, 2007	Mount Lemmon	Mount Lemmon Survey	3:2	4.2 km	MPC · JPL
444787	2007 TM_{106}	—	October 4, 2007	Kitt Peak	Spacewatch	·	840 m	MPC · JPL
444788	2007 TN_{121}	—	October 6, 2007	Kitt Peak	Spacewatch	·	900 m	MPC · JPL
444789	2007 TO_{124}	—	October 6, 2007	Kitt Peak	Spacewatch	·	860 m	MPC · JPL
444790	2007 TO_{136}	—	September 18, 2007	Catalina	CSS	BRG	1.2 km	MPC · JPL
444791	2007 TR_{160}	—	September 8, 2007	Catalina	CSS	EUN	1.7 km	MPC · JPL
444792	2007 TK_{187}	—	November 1, 1999	Kitt Peak	Spacewatch	T_{j} (2.97)	3.8 km	MPC · JPL
444793	2007 TB_{202}	—	October 8, 2007	Mount Lemmon	Mount Lemmon Survey	·	770 m	MPC · JPL
444794	2007 TJ_{209}	—	October 11, 2007	Mount Lemmon	Mount Lemmon Survey	T_{j} (2.99) · 3:2 · SHU	4.5 km	MPC · JPL
444795	2007 TR_{216}	—	October 7, 2007	Kitt Peak	Spacewatch	·	1.3 km	MPC · JPL
444796	2007 TK_{227}	—	October 8, 2007	Kitt Peak	Spacewatch	·	930 m	MPC · JPL
444797	2007 TV_{229}	—	October 8, 2007	Kitt Peak	Spacewatch	·	940 m	MPC · JPL
444798	2007 TZ_{236}	—	October 9, 2007	Mount Lemmon	Mount Lemmon Survey	H	470 m	MPC · JPL
444799	2007 TA_{246}	—	October 9, 2007	Mount Lemmon	Mount Lemmon Survey	·	930 m	MPC · JPL
444800	2007 TX_{271}	—	October 19, 2003	Kitt Peak	Spacewatch	·	740 m	MPC · JPL

== 444801–444900 ==
back to top

Designation			Discovery			Properties		Ref
Permanent	Provisional	Named after	Date	Site	Discoverer(s)	Category	Diam.	Ref
444801	2007 TZ_{277}	—	October 11, 2007	Mount Lemmon	Mount Lemmon Survey	·	850 m	MPC · JPL
444802	2007 TP_{330}	—	October 11, 2007	Kitt Peak	Spacewatch	·	1.1 km	MPC · JPL
444803	2007 TH_{356}	—	October 12, 2007	Catalina	CSS	·	1.5 km	MPC · JPL
444804	2007 TT_{398}	—	October 15, 2007	Kitt Peak	Spacewatch	·	770 m	MPC · JPL
444805	2007 TP_{427}	—	October 10, 2007	Kitt Peak	Spacewatch	·	710 m	MPC · JPL
444806	2007 TR_{427}	—	October 10, 2007	Kitt Peak	Spacewatch	·	1.2 km	MPC · JPL
444807	2007 TQ_{440}	—	September 14, 2007	Mount Lemmon	Mount Lemmon Survey	·	790 m	MPC · JPL
444808	2007 TR_{440}	—	October 7, 2007	Catalina	CSS	T_{j} (2.98) · 3:2	6.1 km	MPC · JPL
444809	2007 TT_{443}	—	October 11, 2007	Catalina	CSS	·	1.2 km	MPC · JPL
444810	2007 UT_{2}	—	September 8, 2007	Catalina	CSS	·	1.5 km	MPC · JPL
444811	2007 UD_{9}	—	October 17, 2007	Anderson Mesa	LONEOS	·	870 m	MPC · JPL
444812	2007 UO_{10}	—	October 18, 2007	Anderson Mesa	LONEOS	·	1.5 km	MPC · JPL
444813	2007 UW_{12}	—	August 22, 2007	Anderson Mesa	LONEOS	MAS	890 m	MPC · JPL
444814	2007 UB_{21}	—	October 16, 2007	Kitt Peak	Spacewatch	·	1.1 km	MPC · JPL
444815	2007 UJ_{23}	—	October 16, 2007	Kitt Peak	Spacewatch	·	810 m	MPC · JPL
444816	2007 UV_{23}	—	October 8, 2007	Mount Lemmon	Mount Lemmon Survey	·	1.0 km	MPC · JPL
444817	2007 UV_{33}	—	October 16, 2007	Catalina	CSS	·	1.7 km	MPC · JPL
444818	2007 UC_{52}	—	September 10, 2007	Mount Lemmon	Mount Lemmon Survey	(5)	1.2 km	MPC · JPL
444819	2007 US_{67}	—	October 18, 2007	Mount Lemmon	Mount Lemmon Survey	KON	1.6 km	MPC · JPL
444820	2007 UW_{77}	—	October 18, 2007	Kitt Peak	Spacewatch	EUN	1.1 km	MPC · JPL
444821	2007 UO_{83}	—	September 18, 2007	Mount Lemmon	Mount Lemmon Survey	·	970 m	MPC · JPL
444822	2007 UN_{86}	—	October 16, 2007	Kitt Peak	Spacewatch	·	1.1 km	MPC · JPL
444823	2007 UC_{127}	—	October 21, 2007	Kitt Peak	Spacewatch	·	1.0 km	MPC · JPL
444824	2007 UQ_{135}	—	October 24, 2007	Mount Lemmon	Mount Lemmon Survey	·	1.1 km	MPC · JPL
444825	2007 UJ_{136}	—	October 16, 2007	Catalina	CSS	H	800 m	MPC · JPL
444826	2007 UX_{137}	—	October 18, 2007	Kitt Peak	Spacewatch	EUN	1.1 km	MPC · JPL
444827	2007 UM_{138}	—	October 19, 2007	Catalina	CSS	·	1.3 km	MPC · JPL
444828	2007 VH_{4}	—	November 2, 2007	Catalina	CSS	·	2.3 km	MPC · JPL
444829	2007 VB_{25}	—	November 2, 2007	Mount Lemmon	Mount Lemmon Survey	·	980 m	MPC · JPL
444830	2007 VW_{38}	—	November 2, 2007	Catalina	CSS	·	1.5 km	MPC · JPL
444831	2007 VE_{64}	—	November 1, 2007	Kitt Peak	Spacewatch	·	1.0 km	MPC · JPL
444832	2007 VP_{65}	—	November 2, 2007	Kitt Peak	Spacewatch	·	640 m	MPC · JPL
444833	2007 VF_{66}	—	November 2, 2007	Kitt Peak	Spacewatch	·	1.0 km	MPC · JPL
444834	2007 VF_{67}	—	November 2, 2007	Kitt Peak	Spacewatch	(5)	1.1 km	MPC · JPL
444835	2007 VJ_{72}	—	October 16, 2007	Mount Lemmon	Mount Lemmon Survey	·	750 m	MPC · JPL
444836	2007 VN_{77}	—	October 12, 2007	Kitt Peak	Spacewatch	·	1.1 km	MPC · JPL
444837	2007 VM_{86}	—	September 25, 2007	Mount Lemmon	Mount Lemmon Survey	·	950 m	MPC · JPL
444838	2007 VM_{87}	—	November 5, 2007	Kitt Peak	Spacewatch	·	1.7 km	MPC · JPL
444839	2007 VW_{90}	—	September 10, 2007	Mount Lemmon	Mount Lemmon Survey	BRG	1.1 km	MPC · JPL
444840	2007 VF_{92}	—	November 8, 2007	Socorro	LINEAR	H	670 m	MPC · JPL
444841	2007 VK_{93}	—	November 2, 2007	Catalina	CSS	EUN	1.3 km	MPC · JPL
444842	2007 VN_{97}	—	November 1, 2007	Kitt Peak	Spacewatch	·	780 m	MPC · JPL
444843	2007 VV_{98}	—	November 2, 2007	Kitt Peak	Spacewatch	·	880 m	MPC · JPL
444844	2007 VQ_{99}	—	November 2, 2007	Kitt Peak	Spacewatch	·	1.1 km	MPC · JPL
444845	2007 VN_{100}	—	November 2, 2007	Kitt Peak	Spacewatch	·	2.0 km	MPC · JPL
444846	2007 VW_{100}	—	September 14, 2007	Mount Lemmon	Mount Lemmon Survey	·	820 m	MPC · JPL
444847	2007 VJ_{112}	—	November 3, 2007	Kitt Peak	Spacewatch	·	1.4 km	MPC · JPL
444848	2007 VM_{158}	—	October 20, 2007	Mount Lemmon	Mount Lemmon Survey	(5)	960 m	MPC · JPL
444849	2007 VW_{167}	—	November 5, 2007	Kitt Peak	Spacewatch	·	1.2 km	MPC · JPL
444850	2007 VU_{179}	—	November 7, 2007	Mount Lemmon	Mount Lemmon Survey	·	1.1 km	MPC · JPL
444851	2007 VM_{185}	—	October 9, 2007	Mount Lemmon	Mount Lemmon Survey	·	1.6 km	MPC · JPL
444852	2007 VW_{185}	—	October 30, 2007	Kitt Peak	Spacewatch	·	1.1 km	MPC · JPL
444853	2007 VM_{186}	—	October 31, 2007	Kitt Peak	Spacewatch	MAR	1.2 km	MPC · JPL
444854	2007 VR_{188}	—	November 11, 2007	Bisei SG Center	BATTeRS	·	2.0 km	MPC · JPL
444855	2007 VF_{201}	—	October 8, 2007	Mount Lemmon	Mount Lemmon Survey	·	830 m	MPC · JPL
444856	2007 VC_{203}	—	October 8, 2007	Mount Lemmon	Mount Lemmon Survey	KON	1.7 km	MPC · JPL
444857	2007 VA_{215}	—	November 1, 2007	Kitt Peak	Spacewatch	·	1.3 km	MPC · JPL
444858	2007 VW_{219}	—	November 9, 2007	Kitt Peak	Spacewatch	·	910 m	MPC · JPL
444859	2007 VV_{230}	—	September 14, 2007	Mount Lemmon	Mount Lemmon Survey	(5)	1.1 km	MPC · JPL
444860	2007 VJ_{235}	—	August 24, 2007	Kitt Peak	Spacewatch	RAF	1.2 km	MPC · JPL
444861	2007 VG_{240}	—	October 5, 2007	Kitt Peak	Spacewatch	·	1.1 km	MPC · JPL
444862	2007 VK_{241}	—	October 15, 2007	Mount Lemmon	Mount Lemmon Survey	·	930 m	MPC · JPL
444863	2007 VQ_{242}	—	November 3, 2007	Catalina	CSS	·	1.4 km	MPC · JPL
444864	2007 VL_{255}	—	November 12, 2007	Mount Lemmon	Mount Lemmon Survey	(5)	1.1 km	MPC · JPL
444865	2007 VW_{255}	—	November 13, 2007	Kitt Peak	Spacewatch	·	760 m	MPC · JPL
444866	2007 VM_{257}	—	October 14, 2007	Mount Lemmon	Mount Lemmon Survey	(5)	1.2 km	MPC · JPL
444867	2007 VQ_{276}	—	October 15, 2007	Kitt Peak	Spacewatch	·	1.1 km	MPC · JPL
444868	2007 VB_{277}	—	November 14, 2007	Kitt Peak	Spacewatch	·	1.1 km	MPC · JPL
444869	2007 VA_{278}	—	November 14, 2007	Kitt Peak	Spacewatch	·	1.5 km	MPC · JPL
444870	2007 VX_{298}	—	November 11, 2007	Catalina	CSS	H	680 m	MPC · JPL
444871	2007 VB_{322}	—	November 8, 2007	Mount Lemmon	Mount Lemmon Survey	(5)	1.2 km	MPC · JPL
444872	2007 VF_{327}	—	November 6, 2007	Kitt Peak	Spacewatch	·	1.2 km	MPC · JPL
444873	2007 VV_{328}	—	November 9, 2007	Kitt Peak	Spacewatch	·	1.1 km	MPC · JPL
444874	2007 VB_{329}	—	November 12, 2007	Mount Lemmon	Mount Lemmon Survey	·	1.8 km	MPC · JPL
444875	2007 VV_{329}	—	November 2, 2007	Kitt Peak	Spacewatch	(5)	1.3 km	MPC · JPL
444876	2007 VL_{332}	—	November 8, 2007	Kitt Peak	Spacewatch	(5)	1.1 km	MPC · JPL
444877	2007 VC_{334}	—	November 12, 2007	Mount Lemmon	Mount Lemmon Survey	·	2.3 km	MPC · JPL
444878	2007 WF	—	November 6, 2007	Kitt Peak	Spacewatch	(5)	1.4 km	MPC · JPL
444879	2007 WO_{7}	—	September 14, 2007	Mount Lemmon	Mount Lemmon Survey	·	1.4 km	MPC · JPL
444880	2007 WD_{8}	—	November 19, 2007	Mount Lemmon	Mount Lemmon Survey	(5)	980 m	MPC · JPL
444881	2007 WL_{8}	—	November 8, 2007	Kitt Peak	Spacewatch	(5)	1.5 km	MPC · JPL
444882	2007 WN_{14}	—	September 15, 2007	Mount Lemmon	Mount Lemmon Survey	·	1.1 km	MPC · JPL
444883	2007 WJ_{19}	—	November 7, 2007	Kitt Peak	Spacewatch	·	1.2 km	MPC · JPL
444884	2007 WO_{20}	—	November 18, 2007	Mount Lemmon	Mount Lemmon Survey	·	1.3 km	MPC · JPL
444885	2007 WZ_{24}	—	November 18, 2007	Mount Lemmon	Mount Lemmon Survey	3:2 · SHU	4.4 km	MPC · JPL
444886	2007 WX_{37}	—	November 19, 2007	Mount Lemmon	Mount Lemmon Survey	·	920 m	MPC · JPL
444887	2007 WO_{44}	—	November 20, 2007	Mount Lemmon	Mount Lemmon Survey	·	1.7 km	MPC · JPL
444888	2007 WM_{54}	—	November 18, 2007	Mount Lemmon	Mount Lemmon Survey	·	1.9 km	MPC · JPL
444889	2007 WU_{59}	—	November 18, 2007	Mount Lemmon	Mount Lemmon Survey	EUN	1.3 km	MPC · JPL
444890	2007 WB_{60}	—	November 20, 2007	Mount Lemmon	Mount Lemmon Survey	·	3.7 km	MPC · JPL
444891	2007 XX_{15}	—	December 8, 2007	La Sagra	OAM	(5)	1.2 km	MPC · JPL
444892	2007 XF_{26}	—	November 9, 2007	Mount Lemmon	Mount Lemmon Survey	·	1.1 km	MPC · JPL
444893	2007 XU_{27}	—	December 14, 2007	Catalina	CSS	·	1.5 km	MPC · JPL
444894	2007 XP_{34}	—	November 2, 2007	Kitt Peak	Spacewatch	RAF	900 m	MPC · JPL
444895	2007 XE_{43}	—	December 15, 2007	Kitt Peak	Spacewatch	·	3.4 km	MPC · JPL
444896	2007 XS_{51}	—	December 5, 2007	Kitt Peak	Spacewatch	(5)	1.3 km	MPC · JPL
444897	2007 XJ_{54}	—	December 5, 2007	Kitt Peak	Spacewatch	·	1.0 km	MPC · JPL
444898	2007 XA_{57}	—	December 4, 2007	Socorro	LINEAR	·	1.3 km	MPC · JPL
444899	2007 XG_{58}	—	November 5, 2007	Mount Lemmon	Mount Lemmon Survey	EUN	1.3 km	MPC · JPL
444900	2007 XJ_{59}	—	December 15, 2007	Catalina	CSS	·	1.7 km	MPC · JPL

== 444901–445000 ==
back to top

Designation			Discovery			Properties		Ref
Permanent	Provisional	Named after	Date	Site	Discoverer(s)	Category	Diam.	Ref
444901	2007 YM_{34}	—	November 19, 2007	Kitt Peak	Spacewatch	(5)	1.2 km	MPC · JPL
444902	2007 YY_{40}	—	December 30, 2007	Catalina	CSS	·	1.6 km	MPC · JPL
444903	2007 YB_{51}	—	December 28, 2007	Kitt Peak	Spacewatch	·	1.3 km	MPC · JPL
444904	2007 YK_{52}	—	December 30, 2007	Mount Lemmon	Mount Lemmon Survey	·	1.7 km	MPC · JPL
444905	2007 YP_{52}	—	November 2, 2007	Mount Lemmon	Mount Lemmon Survey	(5)	1.2 km	MPC · JPL
444906	2007 YD_{53}	—	December 30, 2007	Kitt Peak	Spacewatch	·	1.6 km	MPC · JPL
444907	2007 YE_{56}	—	December 29, 2007	Lulin	LUSS	·	1.8 km	MPC · JPL
444908	2007 YF_{56}	—	December 4, 2007	Anderson Mesa	LONEOS	·	2.6 km	MPC · JPL
444909	2007 YV_{61}	—	December 31, 2007	Mount Lemmon	Mount Lemmon Survey	·	1.6 km	MPC · JPL
444910	2007 YM_{64}	—	December 18, 2007	Kitt Peak	Spacewatch	·	1.6 km	MPC · JPL
444911	2007 YT_{67}	—	December 18, 2007	Kitt Peak	Spacewatch	AGN	1.1 km	MPC · JPL
444912	2008 AD_{5}	—	December 5, 2007	Anderson Mesa	LONEOS	·	2.1 km	MPC · JPL
444913	2008 AT_{5}	—	September 10, 2007	Mount Lemmon	Mount Lemmon Survey	·	1.3 km	MPC · JPL
444914	2008 AZ_{13}	—	January 10, 2008	Mount Lemmon	Mount Lemmon Survey	·	1.7 km	MPC · JPL
444915	2008 AE_{18}	—	December 30, 2007	Kitt Peak	Spacewatch	·	1.1 km	MPC · JPL
444916	2008 AB_{30}	—	January 8, 2008	Altschwendt	W. Ries	MIS	2.1 km	MPC · JPL
444917	2008 AT_{41}	—	January 10, 2008	Catalina	CSS	·	1.3 km	MPC · JPL
444918	2008 AT_{52}	—	December 30, 2007	Mount Lemmon	Mount Lemmon Survey	·	1.5 km	MPC · JPL
444919	2008 AZ_{62}	—	January 11, 2008	Kitt Peak	Spacewatch	KOR	1.2 km	MPC · JPL
444920	2008 AL_{63}	—	November 11, 2007	Mount Lemmon	Mount Lemmon Survey	·	1.3 km	MPC · JPL
444921	2008 AC_{92}	—	November 3, 2007	Mount Lemmon	Mount Lemmon Survey	·	1.4 km	MPC · JPL
444922	2008 AA_{98}	—	January 14, 2008	Kitt Peak	Spacewatch	·	1.6 km	MPC · JPL
444923	2008 AK_{98}	—	November 11, 2007	Mount Lemmon	Mount Lemmon Survey	·	1.6 km	MPC · JPL
444924	2008 AT_{112}	—	December 14, 2007	Mount Lemmon	Mount Lemmon Survey	·	2.2 km	MPC · JPL
444925	2008 AF_{116}	—	January 11, 2008	Mount Lemmon	Mount Lemmon Survey	·	1.8 km	MPC · JPL
444926	2008 AK_{116}	—	January 14, 2008	Kitt Peak	Spacewatch	·	1.8 km	MPC · JPL
444927	2008 AE_{117}	—	January 3, 2008	Purple Mountain	PMO NEO Survey Program	·	1.5 km	MPC · JPL
444928	2008 AB_{127}	—	January 1, 2008	Kitt Peak	Spacewatch	·	1.5 km	MPC · JPL
444929	2008 AD_{138}	—	March 28, 2008	Mount Lemmon	Mount Lemmon Survey	·	1.4 km	MPC · JPL
444930	2008 BM_{24}	—	January 30, 2008	Catalina	CSS	·	1.3 km	MPC · JPL
444931	2008 BS_{32}	—	November 8, 2007	Mount Lemmon	Mount Lemmon Survey	·	1.7 km	MPC · JPL
444932	2008 BO_{34}	—	January 30, 2008	Kitt Peak	Spacewatch	GEF	1.2 km	MPC · JPL
444933	2008 BA_{52}	—	January 18, 2008	Kitt Peak	Spacewatch	·	3.4 km	MPC · JPL
444934	2008 BF_{53}	—	January 19, 2008	Mount Lemmon	Mount Lemmon Survey	·	1.5 km	MPC · JPL
444935	2008 CQ_{1}	—	February 3, 2008	Mount Lemmon	Mount Lemmon Survey	AMO	480 m	MPC · JPL
444936	2008 CE_{3}	—	February 1, 2008	Lulin	LUSS	·	1.9 km	MPC · JPL
444937	2008 CD_{17}	—	February 3, 2008	Kitt Peak	Spacewatch	·	2.3 km	MPC · JPL
444938	2008 CU_{23}	—	February 1, 2008	Kitt Peak	Spacewatch	(13314)	1.6 km	MPC · JPL
444939	2008 CW_{26}	—	January 13, 2008	Kitt Peak	Spacewatch	·	2.0 km	MPC · JPL
444940	2008 CX_{40}	—	February 2, 2008	Kitt Peak	Spacewatch	·	1.5 km	MPC · JPL
444941	2008 CF_{46}	—	February 2, 2008	Kitt Peak	Spacewatch	·	2.4 km	MPC · JPL
444942	2008 CL_{48}	—	December 14, 2007	Mount Lemmon	Mount Lemmon Survey	·	1.5 km	MPC · JPL
444943	2008 CX_{57}	—	February 7, 2008	Mount Lemmon	Mount Lemmon Survey	MRX	790 m	MPC · JPL
444944	2008 CY_{60}	—	February 7, 2008	Mount Lemmon	Mount Lemmon Survey	·	1.5 km	MPC · JPL
444945	2008 CG_{71}	—	November 19, 2007	Mount Lemmon	Mount Lemmon Survey	·	1.8 km	MPC · JPL
444946	2008 CP_{83}	—	February 7, 2008	Kitt Peak	Spacewatch	·	2.1 km	MPC · JPL
444947	2008 CG_{92}	—	February 8, 2008	Kitt Peak	Spacewatch	·	1.6 km	MPC · JPL
444948	2008 CD_{101}	—	January 1, 2008	Kitt Peak	Spacewatch	·	1.8 km	MPC · JPL
444949	2008 CU_{107}	—	February 9, 2008	Catalina	CSS	·	1.8 km	MPC · JPL
444950	2008 CZ_{107}	—	February 9, 2008	Kitt Peak	Spacewatch	EUN	1.2 km	MPC · JPL
444951	2008 CT_{124}	—	February 7, 2008	Mount Lemmon	Mount Lemmon Survey	·	2.0 km	MPC · JPL
444952	2008 CX_{138}	—	February 8, 2008	Kitt Peak	Spacewatch	·	1.8 km	MPC · JPL
444953	2008 CW_{159}	—	February 9, 2008	Kitt Peak	Spacewatch	·	2.0 km	MPC · JPL
444954	2008 CJ_{202}	—	February 7, 2008	Kitt Peak	Spacewatch	·	2.4 km	MPC · JPL
444955	2008 CD_{204}	—	February 2, 2008	Mount Lemmon	Mount Lemmon Survey	·	1.5 km	MPC · JPL
444956	2008 CH_{204}	—	February 13, 2008	Mount Lemmon	Mount Lemmon Survey	·	1.5 km	MPC · JPL
444957	2008 CD_{209}	—	February 1, 2008	Kitt Peak	Spacewatch	·	1.7 km	MPC · JPL
444958	2008 DS_{8}	—	February 25, 2008	Mount Lemmon	Mount Lemmon Survey	·	2.2 km	MPC · JPL
444959	2008 DX_{17}	—	February 26, 2008	Mount Lemmon	Mount Lemmon Survey	KOR	1.6 km	MPC · JPL
444960	2008 DV_{25}	—	February 29, 2008	Purple Mountain	PMO NEO Survey Program	(18466)	2.1 km	MPC · JPL
444961	2008 DP_{44}	—	February 10, 2008	Kitt Peak	Spacewatch	EOS	1.6 km	MPC · JPL
444962	2008 DG_{48}	—	February 28, 2008	Mount Lemmon	Mount Lemmon Survey	·	3.3 km	MPC · JPL
444963	2008 DX_{51}	—	November 14, 2007	Mount Lemmon	Mount Lemmon Survey	·	1.4 km	MPC · JPL
444964	2008 DX_{80}	—	February 24, 2008	Mount Lemmon	Mount Lemmon Survey	AST	1.7 km	MPC · JPL
444965	2008 DJ_{87}	—	February 28, 2008	Mount Lemmon	Mount Lemmon Survey	EOS	2.3 km	MPC · JPL
444966	2008 DL_{87}	—	February 28, 2008	Kitt Peak	Spacewatch	·	2.0 km	MPC · JPL
444967	2008 ER_{9}	—	March 1, 2008	Kitt Peak	Spacewatch	H	500 m	MPC · JPL
444968	2008 EQ_{15}	—	March 1, 2008	Kitt Peak	Spacewatch	EOS	1.5 km	MPC · JPL
444969	2008 EO_{25}	—	March 3, 2008	XuYi	PMO NEO Survey Program	·	2.6 km	MPC · JPL
444970	2008 EL_{37}	—	March 4, 2008	Kitt Peak	Spacewatch	·	3.4 km	MPC · JPL
444971	2008 EF_{50}	—	February 28, 2008	Mount Lemmon	Mount Lemmon Survey	·	1.8 km	MPC · JPL
444972	2008 EN_{56}	—	February 24, 2008	Mount Lemmon	Mount Lemmon Survey	·	2.3 km	MPC · JPL
444973	2008 EX_{60}	—	February 10, 2008	Mount Lemmon	Mount Lemmon Survey	GEF	1.3 km	MPC · JPL
444974	2008 EA_{65}	—	February 12, 2008	Mount Lemmon	Mount Lemmon Survey	·	2.6 km	MPC · JPL
444975	2008 EL_{75}	—	February 28, 2008	Kitt Peak	Spacewatch	LIX	3.6 km	MPC · JPL
444976	2008 EL_{77}	—	February 28, 2008	Kitt Peak	Spacewatch	EOS	2.4 km	MPC · JPL
444977	2008 EH_{115}	—	March 8, 2008	Kitt Peak	Spacewatch	·	2.3 km	MPC · JPL
444978	2008 EW_{118}	—	February 10, 2008	Mount Lemmon	Mount Lemmon Survey	·	1.8 km	MPC · JPL
444979	2008 EY_{152}	—	March 11, 2008	Kitt Peak	Spacewatch	·	4.2 km	MPC · JPL
444980	2008 EO_{161}	—	March 8, 2008	Mount Lemmon	Mount Lemmon Survey	KOR	1.4 km	MPC · JPL
444981	2008 ET_{161}	—	March 10, 2008	Kitt Peak	Spacewatch	·	2.0 km	MPC · JPL
444982	2008 EC_{168}	—	March 10, 2008	Kitt Peak	Spacewatch	·	2.9 km	MPC · JPL
444983	2008 FD_{12}	—	February 2, 2008	Kitt Peak	Spacewatch	·	2.1 km	MPC · JPL
444984	2008 FR_{25}	—	March 27, 2008	Kitt Peak	Spacewatch	·	2.2 km	MPC · JPL
444985	2008 FR_{31}	—	March 28, 2008	Mount Lemmon	Mount Lemmon Survey	·	1.7 km	MPC · JPL
444986	2008 FV_{35}	—	February 13, 2008	Mount Lemmon	Mount Lemmon Survey	·	2.2 km	MPC · JPL
444987	2008 FW_{51}	—	March 8, 2008	Kitt Peak	Spacewatch	·	1.7 km	MPC · JPL
444988	2008 FM_{82}	—	March 27, 2008	Mount Lemmon	Mount Lemmon Survey	·	1.9 km	MPC · JPL
444989	2008 FP_{90}	—	March 29, 2008	Mount Lemmon	Mount Lemmon Survey	·	1.8 km	MPC · JPL
444990	2008 FU_{98}	—	March 30, 2008	Kitt Peak	Spacewatch	EOS	1.8 km	MPC · JPL
444991	2008 FH_{116}	—	March 31, 2008	Mount Lemmon	Mount Lemmon Survey	NAE	1.7 km	MPC · JPL
444992	2008 FX_{121}	—	September 13, 2004	Kitt Peak	Spacewatch	·	2.5 km	MPC · JPL
444993	2008 GR_{4}	—	February 26, 2008	Kitt Peak	Spacewatch	·	2.8 km	MPC · JPL
444994	2008 GG_{29}	—	October 1, 2000	Kitt Peak	Spacewatch	NAE	1.8 km	MPC · JPL
444995	2008 GV_{32}	—	April 3, 2008	Kitt Peak	Spacewatch	·	680 m	MPC · JPL
444996	2008 GV_{61}	—	April 5, 2008	Mount Lemmon	Mount Lemmon Survey	·	2.6 km	MPC · JPL
444997	2008 GW_{75}	—	September 27, 2005	Kitt Peak	Spacewatch	·	1.5 km	MPC · JPL
444998	2008 GR_{79}	—	March 30, 2008	Kitt Peak	Spacewatch	EOS	1.8 km	MPC · JPL
444999	2008 GG_{101}	—	April 9, 2008	Kitt Peak	Spacewatch	THM	2.2 km	MPC · JPL
445000	2008 GX_{102}	—	April 6, 2008	Kitt Peak	Spacewatch	·	3.0 km	MPC · JPL

back to top

== Meaning of names ==
As minor planet discoveries are confirmed, they are given a permanent number by the IAU's Minor Planet Center (MPC), and the discoverers can then submit names for them, following the IAU's naming conventions. The list below concerns those minor planets in the specified number-range that have received names, and explains the meanings of those names.

Official naming citations of newly named small Solar System bodies are approved and published in a bulletin by IAU's Working Group for Small Bodies Nomenclature (WGSBN). Before May 2021, citations were published in MPC's Minor Planet Circulars for many decades. Recent citations can also be found on the JPL Small-Body Database (SBDB). Until his death in 2016, German astronomer Lutz D. Schmadel compiled these citations into the Dictionary of Minor Planet Names (DMP) and regularly updated the collection.

Based on Paul Herget's The Names of the Minor Planets, Schmadel also researched the unclear origin of numerous asteroids, most of which had been named prior to World War II. This article incorporates text from this source, which is in the public domain: SBDB New namings may only be added to this list below after official publication as the preannouncement of names is condemned. The WGSBN publishes a comprehensive guideline for the naming rules of non-cometary small Solar System bodies.

Named minor planet	Provisional	This minor planet was named for...	Ref · Catalog
444411 Lutherbeegle	2006 AR_{51}	Luther Beegle (b. 1966), an American planetary scientist.	IAU · 444411
444414 Mikehankey	2006 AQ_{56}	Mike Hankey (b. 1972) is an American and the Operations Manager for the American Meteor Society.	IAU · 444414
444418 Rohitbhartia	2006 BM_{30}	Rohit Bhartia (b. 1975), an American planetary scientist.	IAU · 444418
444419 Francismccubbin	2006 BR_{34}	Francis McCubbin (b. 1982), an American planetary scientist.	IAU · 444419
444562 Visaginas	2006 SP_{368}	Visaginas, a town in northeastern Lithuania.	IAU · 444562
