= List of unnumbered minor planets: 2003 M–R =

This is a partial list of unnumbered minor planets for principal provisional designations assigned between 16 June and 15 September 2003. As of November 2025, a total of 176 bodies remain unnumbered for this period. Objects for this year are listed on the following pages: A–E · F–G · H–L · M–R · S_{i} · S_{ii} · S_{iii} · S_{iv} · T · U_{i} · U_{ii} · U_{iii} · U_{iv} · V · W_{i} · W_{ii} and X–Y. Also see previous and next year.

Near-Earth obj.	MBA (inner)	MBA (outer)	Centaur
Mars-crosser	MBA (middle)	Jupiter trojan	Trans-Neptunian obj.
Unclassified

== M ==
U	Designation	Class	Physical		Observations				Description and notes	Ref
U	Designation	Class	H	D	Opp.	Arc	Last	Used	Description and notes	Ref
7	2003 MN	APO	23.8	62 m	single	1 day	23 Jun 2003	23	Disc.: LINEAR	MPC · JPL
0	2003 MU	AMO	20.4	300 m	multiple	2003–2012	17 Nov 2012	133	Disc.: LONEOS; Potentially hazardous object	MPC · JPL
1	2003 MV	MCA	18.4	1.2 km	multiple	2003–2019	29 Mar 2019	32	Disc.: Spacewatch	MPC · JPL
6	2003 ME1	APO	23.6	68 m	single	36 days	29 Jul 2003	69	Disc.: LINEAR	MPC · JPL
0	2003 MS2	APO	21.21	200 m	multiple	2003–2022	22 Jan 2022	241	Disc.: LONEOS; Potentially hazardous object	MPC · JPL
0	2003 MK4	APO	20.9	230 m	multiple	2003–2021	09 Jun 2021	244	Disc.: LINEAR; Potentially hazardous object	MPC · JPL
0	2003 ME7	AMO	20.7	260 m	multiple	2003–2015	08 Aug 2015	63	Disc.: LINEAR	MPC · JPL
0	2003 MF7	MCA	18.9	490 m	multiple	2003–2016	28 Jun 2016	120	Disc.: LINEAR	MPC · JPL
1	2003 MW7	APO	21.49	180 m	multiple	2003-2022	24 Jun 2022	73	Disc.: LINEAR	MPC · JPL
0	2003 MF13	MBA-M	17.4	1.4 km	multiple	2003–2016	19 Oct 2016	51	Disc.: SDSS	MPC · JPL

back to top

== N ==
U	Designation	Class	Physical		Observations				Description and notes	Ref
U	Designation	Class	H	D	Opp.	Arc	Last	Used	Description and notes	Ref
1	2003 NB	AMO	19.7	410 m	multiple	2003–2006	03 Jun 2006	200	Disc.: LINEAR	MPC · JPL
0	2003 ND	AMO	18.7	650 m	multiple	2003–2016	02 May 2016	141	Disc.: AMOS	MPC · JPL
0	2003 NX	MCA	18.38	630 m	multiple	2003–2021	28 Nov 2021	69	Disc.: LINEAR	MPC · JPL
1	2003 NJ5	MBA-M	18.2	680 m	multiple	2003–2020	22 Aug 2020	49	Disc.: VATT	MPC · JPL
–	2003 NU5	MCA	19.5	700 m	single	2 days	08 Jul 2003	9	Disc.: Spacewatch	MPC · JPL
0	2003 NV5	MCA	20.58	230 m	multiple	2003–2019	26 Sep 2019	35	Disc.: Spacewatch	MPC · JPL
3	2003 NZ5	MBA-O	17.92	1.5 km	multiple	2003-2021	30 Aug 2021	28	Disc.: VATT	MPC · JPL
0	2003 NA7	MCA	18.9	490 m	multiple	2003–2020	12 Dec 2020	200	Disc.: NEAT	MPC · JPL
2	2003 NL7	AMO	20.0	360 m	multiple	2003–2006	26 Apr 2006	118	Disc.: NEAT	MPC · JPL
1	2003 NQ14	MBA-I	18.3	650 m	multiple	2003–2019	30 Jun 2019	42	Disc.: NEAT	MPC · JPL
0	2003 NW14	MBA-I	19.0	470 m	multiple	2003–2018	30 Sep 2018	24	Disc.: Spacewatch	MPC · JPL
0	2003 NA15	MBA-M	18.37	630 m	multiple	2003–2021	30 Nov 2021	31	Disc.: Spacewatch	MPC · JPL
0	2003 NE15	MBA-M	18.1	710 m	multiple	2003–2020	11 Nov 2020	66	Disc.: Spacewatch; Added on 17 January 2021	MPC · JPL
0	2003 NH15	MBA-O	17.5	1.8 km	multiple	2002–2019	23 Sep 2019	32	Disc.: Spacewatch; Added on 21 August 2021	MPC · JPL
3	2003 NJ15	MBA-M	18.1	1.3 km	multiple	2003–2017	23 Nov 2017	18	Disc.: Spacewatch; Added on 24 December 2021	MPC · JPL

back to top

== O ==
U	Designation	Class	Physical		Observations				Description and notes	Ref
U	Designation	Class	H	D	Opp.	Arc	Last	Used	Description and notes	Ref
1	2003 OL	MBA-I	19.6	360 m	multiple	2003–2017	13 Sep 2017	18	Disc.: Siding Spring Obs.	MPC · JPL
0	2003 OC3	APO	18.8	620 m	multiple	2003–2020	30 Jun 2020	210	Disc.: NEAT; Potentially hazardous object	MPC · JPL
0	2003 OX5	MCA	20.0	420 m	multiple	2003–2016	07 Nov 2016	70	Disc.: NEAT	MPC · JPL
0	2003 OQ6	MBA-M	17.8	1.2 km	multiple	2003–2021	06 Jan 2021	100	Disc.: NEAT; Added on 24 August 2020; Alt.: 2016 NQ	MPC · JPL
0	2003 OE11	MCA	19.48	430 m	multiple	2003–2026	26 Jul 2026	141	Disc.: NEAT	MPC · JPL
0	2003 OT13	APO	23.3	78 m	multiple	2003–2018	22 Jan 2018	129	Disc.: LINEAR	MPC · JPL
1	2003 OU13	MCA	18.7	760 m	multiple	2003–2020	27 Jul 2020	34	Disc.: NEAT; Alt.: 2020 NW	MPC · JPL
1	2003 OY16	MCA	19.4	390 m	multiple	2003–2018	17 Jan 2018	27	Disc.: LINEAR	MPC · JPL
5	2003 OS33	TNO	7.5	119 km	multiple	2003–2004	06 Nov 2004	25	Disc.: Mauna Kea Obs. LoUTNOs, SDO	MPC · JPL
9	2003 OV33	MBA-O	18.22	1.3 km	single	1 day	01 Aug 2003	10	Disc.: Mauna Kea Obs. Added on 21 August 2021	MPC · JPL
9	2003 OW33	MBA-O	19.04	870 m	single	1 day	01 Aug 2003	11	Disc.: Mauna Kea Obs. Added on 21 August 2021	MPC · JPL
9	2003 OX33	MBA-M	20.42	460 m	single	1 day	01 Aug 2003	10	Disc.: Mauna Kea Obs. Added on 21 August 2021	MPC · JPL
9	2003 OB34	MBA-I	21.23	170 m	single	1 day	01 Aug 2003	10	Disc.: Mauna Kea Obs. Added on 21 August 2021	MPC · JPL
–	2003 OF34	MBA-O	17.7	1.6 km	single	23 days	23 Aug 2003	12	Disc.: Mauna Kea Obs.	MPC · JPL
0	2003 OG34	MBA-M	18.7	760 m	multiple	2003–2020	17 Sep 2020	48	Disc.: Mauna Kea Obs.	MPC · JPL
0	2003 OM34	MBA-M	18.3	920 m	multiple	2003–2022	27 Jan 2022	55	Disc.: Mauna Kea Obs. Added on 29 January 2022	MPC · JPL
0	2003 OH35	MBA-I	18.3	650 m	multiple	2003–2014	30 May 2014	24	Disc.: NEAT	MPC · JPL

back to top

== P ==
U	Designation	Class	Physical		Observations				Description and notes	Ref
U	Designation	Class	H	D	Opp.	Arc	Last	Used	Description and notes	Ref
–	2003 PM5	MCA	19.9	310 m	single	1 day	05 Aug 2003	42	Disc.: LINEAR	MPC · JPL
5	2003 PN5	AMO	23.2	81 m	single	83 days	26 Oct 2003	37	Disc.: LINEAR	MPC · JPL
0	2003 PS10	HUN	19.18	430 m	multiple	2003–2026	06 Feb 2026	50	Disc.: Spacewatch; Added on 24 December 2021	MPC · JPL
5	2003 PY10	MCA	19.6	670 m	multiple	44 days	18 Sep 2003	54	Disc.: LINEAR	MPC · JPL
1	2003 PQ13	MBA-I	18.7	540 m	multiple	2003–2018	12 Jul 2018	33	Disc.: Spacewatch; Added on 22 July 2020	MPC · JPL
0	2003 PS13	MBA-O	16.4	2.9 km	multiple	2003–2020	14 Dec 2020	110	Disc.: AMOS; Added on 19 October 2020; Alt.: 2010 AD132	MPC · JPL
0	2003 PV13	MBA-I	19.19	430 m	multiple	2003–2021	13 Sep 2021	47	Disc.: Spacewatch; Added on 21 August 2021	MPC · JPL
1	2003 PW13	MBA-M	18.49	1.1 km	multiple	2003–2021	11 Oct 2021	31	Disc.: No observations Added on 30 September 2021	MPC · JPL

back to top

== Q ==
U	Designation	Class	Physical		Observations				Description and notes	Ref
U	Designation	Class	H	D	Opp.	Arc	Last	Used	Description and notes	Ref
4	2003 QC	AMO	20.8	250 m	single	87 days	13 Nov 2003	187	Disc.: AMOS	MPC · JPL
0	2003 QA1	MBA-M	17.49	1.8 km	multiple	2003–2021	26 Oct 2021	56	Disc.: NEAT	MPC · JPL
6	2003 QK5	AMO	22.6	110 m	single	66 days	26 Oct 2003	41	Disc.: NEAT	MPC · JPL
7	2003 QU5	APO	24.2	51 m	single	9 days	30 Aug 2003	52	Disc.: LINEAR	MPC · JPL
0	2003 QR9	MCA	18.9	490 m	multiple	2003–2019	06 Jul 2019	95	Disc.: NEAT	MPC · JPL
0	2003 QB10	MCA	19.13	670 m	multiple	2003-2024	25 Aug 2024	49	Disc.: NEAT	MPC · JPL
0	2003 QQ10	AMO	19.5	450 m	multiple	2003–2020	11 Dec 2020	262	Disc.: NEAT	MPC · JPL
0	2003 QD29	MCA	19.2	430 m	multiple	2003–2020	22 Jun 2020	47	Disc.: NEAT	MPC · JPL
1	2003 QH29	MBA-M	18.35	640 m	multiple	1999–2019	02 Jun 2019	36	Disc.: NEAT	MPC · JPL
5	2003 QY29	AMO	22.3	120 m	single	28 days	20 Sep 2003	62	Disc.: LINEAR	MPC · JPL
0	2003 QZ29	APO	19.0	560 m	multiple	2003–2012	19 Feb 2012	224	Disc.: LINEAR	MPC · JPL
0	2003 QA30	AMO	21.75	160 m	multiple	2003–2021	03 Oct 2021	87	Disc.: LINEAR	MPC · JPL
6	2003 QB30	APO	26.8	16 m	single	3 days	27 Aug 2003	29	Disc.: LINEAR	MPC · JPL
3	2003 QY30	MCA	17.69	1.3 km	multiple	2003-2025	21 Aug 2025	138	Disc.: AMOS	MPC · JPL
1	2003 QB31	AMO	21.91	170 m	multiple	2003-2025	22 Jun 2025	49	Disc.: NEAT	MPC · JPL
0	2003 QP47	MCA	18.9	490 m	multiple	2003–2013	13 Dec 2013	47	Disc.: NEAT	MPC · JPL
4	2003 QC70	MCA	19.3	770 m	single	61 days	27 Oct 2003	42	Disc.: NEAT	MPC · JPL
0	2003 QF70	AMO	20.02	370 m	multiple	2003–2026	05 Aug 2026	168	Disc.: NEAT	MPC · JPL
–	2003 QY80	MBA-O	16.3	3.1 km	single	8 days	31 Aug 2003	7	Disc.: Cerro Tololo	MPC · JPL
0	2003 QC81	MBA-M	18.14	990 m	multiple	1999–2021	25 Nov 2021	42	Disc.: Cerro Tololo; Added on 5 November 2021	MPC · JPL
–	2003 QK81	MBA-M	18.7	540 m	single	14 days	05 Sep 2003	7	Disc.: Cerro Tololo	MPC · JPL
0	2003 QD82	MBA-I	18.50	590 m	multiple	2003–2020	16 May 2020	27	Disc.: Cerro Tololo; Added on 17 June 2021; Alt.: 2009 DJ57	MPC · JPL
3	2003 QN82	MBA-O	17.81	1.4 km	multiple	2003–2023	19 Mar 2023	22	Disc.: Cerro Tololo	MPC · JPL
0	2003 QW82	MBA-I	18.7	540 m	multiple	2002–2021	13 Oct 2021	27	Disc.: Cerro Tololo Obs. Added on 24 December 2021	MPC · JPL
2	2003 QY82	MBA-I	19.0	470 m	multiple	2003–2021	08 May 2021	34	Disc.: Cerro Tololo; Added on 17 June 2021; Alt.: 2021 GK40	MPC · JPL
2	2003 QD83	MBA-M	18.34	1.2 km	multiple	2003–2021	05 Aug 2021	26	Disc.: Cerro Tololo; Added on 22 July 2020	MPC · JPL
0	2003 QV83	MBA-I	19.1	450 m	multiple	2003–2019	01 May 2019	26	Disc.: Cerro Tololo	MPC · JPL
E	2003 QX83	MBA-O	18.3	1.2 km	single	7 days	31 Aug 2003	7	Disc.: Cerro Tololo	MPC · JPL
5	2003 QY83	MBA-O	17.67	1.5 km	multiple	2003-2021	31 Oct 2021	17	Disc.: Cerro Tololo	MPC · JPL
0	2003 QA84	MBA-M	18.09	1.3 km	multiple	2003–2021	29 Sep 2021	42	Disc.: Cerro Tololo; Added on 30 September 2021	MPC · JPL
–	2003 QD84	MBA-O	18.7	1.0 km	single	7 days	31 Aug 2003	7	Disc.: Cerro Tololo	MPC · JPL
1	2003 QE84	MBA-O	18.13	1.1 km	multiple	2003-2023	19 Nov 2023	30	Disc.: Cerro Tololo	MPC · JPL
0	2003 QH84	MBA-I	19.21	440 m	multiple	2003-2022	17 Dec 2022	42	Disc.: Cerro Tololo	MPC · JPL
–	2003 QJ84	MBA-O	18.1	1.3 km	single	7 days	31 Aug 2003	7	Disc.: Cerro Tololo	MPC · JPL
–	2003 QL84	MBA-M	19.3	770 m	single	7 days	31 Aug 2003	7	Disc.: Cerro Tololo	MPC · JPL
0	2003 QT84	MBA-O	17.22	1.9 km	multiple	2003-2023	23 Apr 2023	41	Disc.: Cerro Tololo	MPC · JPL
–	2003 QV84	MBA-M	19.2	800 m	single	6 days	30 Aug 2003	7	Disc.: Cerro Tololo	MPC · JPL
0	2003 QP89	MBA-M	17.6	900 m	multiple	2003–2020	21 Nov 2020	40	Disc.: Črni Vrh Obs.	MPC · JPL
3	2003 QT90	TNO	6.8	145 km	multiple	2003–2016	05 Nov 2016	12	Disc.: Cerro Tololo; LoUTNOs, cubewano (cold)	MPC · JPL
E	2003 QU90	TNO	7.2	121 km	single	62 days	24 Oct 2003	7	Disc.: Cerro Tololo; LoUTNOs, cubewano (cold)	MPC · JPL
4	2003 QX90	TNO	6.8	145 km	multiple	2003–2020	12 Aug 2020	17	Disc.: Cerro Tololo; LoUTNOs, cubewano (cold)	MPC · JPL
3	2003 QY90	TNO	6.47	81 km	multiple	2000–2021	03 Oct 2021	45	Disc.: Cerro Tololo; LoUTNOs, cubewano (cold), albedo: 0.310; binary: 80 km	MPC · JPL
E	2003 QZ90	TNO	6.7	157 km	single	1 day	25 Aug 2003	3	Disc.: Cerro Tololo; LoUTNOs, cubewano?	MPC · JPL
E	2003 QC91	TNO	7.0	137 km	single	59 days	23 Oct 2003	5	Disc.: Cerro Tololo; LoUTNOs, cubewano?	MPC · JPL
4	2003 QD91	TNO	7.3	115 km	multiple	2003–2014	29 Jul 2014	12	Disc.: Cerro Tololo; LoUTNOs, cubewano (cold)	MPC · JPL
3	2003 QE91	TNO	7.33	114 km	multiple	2003–2021	08 Aug 2021	19	Disc.: Cerro Tololo; LoUTNOs, cubewano (cold)	MPC · JPL
3	2003 QF91	TNO	7.39	111 km	multiple	2003–2021	03 Oct 2021	18	Disc.: Cerro Tololo; LoUTNOs, cubewano (cold)	MPC · JPL
4	2003 QG91	TNO	7.37	112 km	multiple	2003–2021	12 Sep 2021	17	Disc.: Cerro Tololo; LoUTNOs, cubewano (cold)	MPC · JPL
4	2003 QJ91	TNO	6.81	144 km	multiple	2003–2021	12 Sep 2021	20	Disc.: Cerro Tololo; LoUTNOs, cubewano (cold)	MPC · JPL
3	2003 QL91	TNO	7.01	132 km	multiple	2003–2021	04 Oct 2021	59	Disc.: Cerro Tololo; LoUTNOs, cubewano (cold)	MPC · JPL
3	2003 QM91	TNO	6.50	167 km	multiple	2003–2020	15 Oct 2020	58	Disc.: Cerro Tololo; LoUTNOs, cubewano (cold)	MPC · JPL
4	2003 QN91	TNO	7.3	115 km	multiple	2003–2014	29 Jul 2014	15	Disc.: Cerro Tololo; LoUTNOs, cubewano (cold)	MPC · JPL
3	2003 QP91	TNO	7.4	120 km	multiple	2003–2018	18 Oct 2018	27	Disc.: Cerro Tololo; LoUTNOs, res · 3:4; Alt.: 2013 RW155	MPC · JPL
3	2003 QS91	TNO	7.7	96 km	multiple	2003–2014	29 Jul 2014	13	Disc.: Cerro Tololo; LoUTNOs, cubewano (cold)	MPC · JPL
–	2003 QU91	TNO	7.4	138 km	single	58 days	22 Oct 2003	7	Disc.: Cerro Tololo; LoUTNOs, other TNO	MPC · JPL
E	2003 QV91	TNO	7.5	150 km	single	61 days	23 Oct 2003	7	Disc.: Cerro Tololo; LoUTNOs, plutino?	MPC · JPL
E	2003 QW91	TNO	9.1	72 km	single	1 day	24 Aug 2003	3	Disc.: Cerro Tololo; LoUTNOs, plutino?	MPC · JPL
2	2003 QX91	TNO	8.46	74 km	multiple	2003–2021	03 Oct 2021	16	Disc.: Cerro Tololo; LoUTNOs, res · 4:7	MPC · JPL
9	2003 QY91	TNO	7.7	109 km	single	1 day	24 Aug 2003	3	Disc.: Cerro Tololo; LoUTNOs, SDO	MPC · JPL
1	2003 QO95	MBA-M	18.1	710 m	multiple	2003–2020	10 Dec 2020	27	Disc.: LPL/Spacewatch II; Added on 17 January 2021	MPC · JPL
0	2003 QG96	MCA	18.96	670 m	multiple	2003-2025	20 Aug 2025	103	Disc.: Spacewatch	MPC · JPL
5	2003 QH96	MCA	19.9	580 m	single	55 days	22 Oct 2003	26	Disc.: NEAT	MPC · JPL
0	2003 QL96	AMO	21.48	190 m	multiple	2003-2022	18 Nov 2022	171	Disc.: LINEAR	MPC · JPL
0	2003 QW96	MBA-O	17.5	1.8 km	multiple	2003–2020	20 Sep 2020	30	Disc.: LPL/Spacewatch II	MPC · JPL
2	2003 QT97	MBA-M	18.8	520 m	multiple	2003–2019	22 Aug 2019	48	Disc.: LPL/Spacewatch II; Alt.: 2015 PZ155	MPC · JPL
1	2003 QE98	MBA-I	18.8	520 m	multiple	2003–2020	05 Nov 2020	58	Disc.: LPL/Spacewatch II; Added on 19 October 2020	MPC · JPL
0	2003 QU98	HIL	16.5	2.8 km	multiple	2003–2021	15 Jan 2021	84	Disc.: LPL/Spacewatch II	MPC · JPL
0	2003 QM104	MBA-M	17.3	1.0 km	multiple	2003–2018	11 Apr 2018	53	Disc.: NEAT	MPC · JPL
0	2003 QV105	MBA-M	17.27	2.0 km	multiple	2003–2021	26 Aug 2021	46	Disc.: LINEAR; Added on 17 June 2021; Alt.: 2021 JU16	MPC · JPL
3	2003 QB112	TNO	7.2	186 km	multiple	2003–2014	27 Sep 2014	18	Disc.: Cerro Tololo; LoUTNOs, cubewano (hot)	MPC · JPL
4	2003 QC112	CEN	8.7	101 km	multiple	2003–2017	23 Sep 2017	33	Disc.: Cerro Tololo	MPC · JPL
1	2003 QD112	CEN	10.7	40 km	multiple	2002–2007	11 Nov 2007	18	Disc.: Cerro Tololo	MPC · JPL
3	2003 QE112	TNO	6.46	170 km	multiple	2003–2021	03 Oct 2021	16	Disc.: Cerro Tololo; LoUTNOs, cubewano (cold)	MPC · JPL
–	2003 QM112	TNO	14.1	8.0 km	single	54 days	22 Oct 2003	9	Disc.: Mauna Kea Obs. LoUTNOs, centaur	MPC · JPL
–	2003 QN112	CEN	12.9	15 km	single	54 days	22 Oct 2003	16	Disc.: Mauna Kea Obs.	MPC · JPL
E	2003 QO112	TNO	11.9	23 km	single	54 days	22 Oct 2003	9	Disc.: Mauna Kea Obs. LoUTNOs, centaur	MPC · JPL
–	2003 QP112	CEN	12.7	16 km	single	54 days	22 Oct 2003	14	Disc.: Mauna Kea Obs.	MPC · JPL
5	2003 QY113	TNO	6.19	157 km	multiple	2003-2025	09 Nov 2025	24	Disc.: Mauna Kea Obs. LoUTNOs, cubewano?	MPC · JPL
1	2003 QZ115	MBA-M	18.1	1.3 km	multiple	2003–2020	13 May 2020	44	Disc.: Mauna Kea Obs. Added on 22 July 2020; Alt.: 2015 ET67	MPC · JPL
1	2003 QB116	MBA-I	19.23	420 m	multiple	2003–2021	28 Nov 2021	31	Disc.: Mauna Kea Obs.	MPC · JPL
1	2003 QK116	MBA-I	19.49	380 m	multiple	2003–2021	08 Sep 2021	39	Disc.: Mauna Kea Obs. Added on 30 September 2021	MPC · JPL
0	2003 QS116	MBA-M	18.0	1.4 km	multiple	2003–2019	08 Jan 2019	37	Disc.: Mauna Kea Obs.	MPC · JPL
1	2003 QT116	MBA-I	18.9	490 m	multiple	2003–2017	29 Sep 2017	19	Disc.: Mauna Kea Obs.	MPC · JPL
0	2003 QH117	MBA-I	19.0	470 m	multiple	2003–2021	11 Sep 2021	35	Disc.: Mauna Kea Obs. Added on 30 September 2021; Alt.: 2017 KM44	MPC · JPL
1	2003 QU117	MBA-M	19.0	470 m	multiple	2003–2020	06 Dec 2020	27	Disc.: Cerro Tololo; Added on 19 October 2020	MPC · JPL
0	2003 QZ117	MBA-M	18.6	800 m	multiple	2003–2020	14 Sep 2020	26	Disc.: Cerro Tololo; Added on 17 January 2021	MPC · JPL
0	2003 QB118	MBA-O	17.6	1.7 km	multiple	2003–2019	24 Aug 2019	24	Disc.: Cerro Tololo; Added on 17 January 2021	MPC · JPL
0	2003 QV118	MBA-M	18.3	920 m	multiple	2003–2021	06 Jan 2021	81	Disc.: Cerro Tololo; Added on 17 January 2021	MPC · JPL
0	2003 QY118	MBA-O	17.9	1.5 km	multiple	2003–2021	12 Feb 2021	26	Disc.: Cerro Tololo; Added on 11 May 2021; Alt.: 2003 QM125	MPC · JPL
0	2003 QE120	MBA-O	18.0	1.4 km	multiple	2003–2018	05 Oct 2018	23	Disc.: Cerro Tololo	MPC · JPL
1	2003 QJ120	HIL	16.6	2.7 km	multiple	2003–2017	26 Apr 2017	20	Disc.: Cerro Tololo	MPC · JPL
0	2003 QQ120	MBA-I	18.1	710 m	multiple	2003–2018	29 Nov 2018	34	Disc.: NEAT	MPC · JPL
0	2003 QU121	MBA-M	18.22	950 m	multiple	2003–2022	04 Jan 2022	57	Disc.: Cerro Tololo	MPC · JPL
0	2003 QV121	MBA-I	18.7	540 m	multiple	2003–2019	27 Sep 2019	58	Disc.: NEAT	MPC · JPL
1	2003 QY121	MBA-I	19.4	390 m	multiple	2003–2018	20 Jan 2018	33	Disc.: Mauna Kea Obs.	MPC · JPL
0	2003 QB122	MBA-I	18.65	550 m	multiple	2003–2021	11 May 2021	61	Disc.: Mauna Kea Obs.	MPC · JPL
0	2003 QD122	MBA-M	18.50	1.1 km	multiple	2003–2021	08 Sep 2021	36	Disc.: Mauna Kea Obs.	MPC · JPL
0	2003 QF122	MCA	19.1	450 m	multiple	2003–2019	04 Jul 2019	34	Disc.: Berg. Gladbach	MPC · JPL
0	2003 QE123	MBA-I	18.8	520 m	multiple	2003–2018	02 Oct 2018	39	Disc.: NEAT	MPC · JPL
0	2003 QG123	HUN	18.8	520 m	multiple	1998–2019	21 Dec 2019	41	Disc.: Cerro Tololo	MPC · JPL
1	2003 QK123	MBA-M	18.4	620 m	multiple	2003–2019	04 Jul 2019	30	Disc.: NEAT	MPC · JPL
0	2003 QQ123	MBA-O	17.1	2.1 km	multiple	2003–2019	23 Sep 2019	45	Disc.: CINEOS	MPC · JPL
0	2003 QY123	MBA-O	17.02	2.2 km	multiple	2003–2021	01 Dec 2021	47	Disc.: Cerro Tololo	MPC · JPL
0	2003 QA124	MBA-I	18.7	540 m	multiple	2003–2021	17 Jan 2021	40	Disc.: Mauna Kea Obs.	MPC · JPL
0	2003 QF124	MBA-O	17.3	1.9 km	multiple	2003–2020	20 Oct 2020	39	Disc.: MLS; Added on 22 July 2020	MPC · JPL
0	2003 QG124	MBA-O	17.7	1.6 km	multiple	2003–2019	20 Oct 2019	36	Disc.: Pan-STARRS; Added on 22 July 2020	MPC · JPL
0	2003 QK124	MBA-O	17.1	2.1 km	multiple	2003–2020	15 Sep 2020	40	Disc.: Cerro Tololo; Added on 22 July 2020	MPC · JPL
0	2003 QQ124	MBA-M	17.9	1.5 km	multiple	2003–2020	13 May 2020	31	Disc.: Pan-STARRS; Added on 22 July 2020	MPC · JPL
0	2003 QR124	MBA-M	18.3	920 m	multiple	2002–2020	20 Jul 2020	37	Disc.: Cerro Tololo; Added on 22 July 2020	MPC · JPL
0	2003 QU124	MBA-M	18.6	800 m	multiple	2003–2020	17 Sep 2020	57	Disc.: Cerro Tololo; Added on 19 October 2020	MPC · JPL
1	2003 QX124	MCA	19.5	370 m	multiple	2003–2016	22 Sep 2016	26	Disc.: NEAT; Added on 19 October 2020	MPC · JPL
1	2003 QC125	MBA-I	18.9	490 m	multiple	2003–2020	01 Feb 2020	30	Disc.: MLS; Added on 17 January 2021	MPC · JPL
0	2003 QD125	MBA-M	18.3	650 m	multiple	2003–2020	06 Dec 2020	47	Disc.: Cerro Tololo; Added on 17 January 2021	
3	2003 QJ125	HIL	16.8	2.4 km	multiple	2003–2020	11 Dec 2020	23	Disc.: Cerro Tololo; Added on 9 March 2021	MPC · JPL
0	2003 QK125	MBA-M	18.9	700 m	multiple	2003–2020	13 Sep 2020	27	Disc.: Cerro Tololo; Added on 9 March 2021	MPC · JPL
0	2003 QR125	MBA-M	18.38	920 m	multiple	2003–2025	20 Jun 2025	31	Disc.: NEAT; Added on 21 August 2021	MPC · JPL
0	2003 QT125	MBA-O	17.67	1.6 km	multiple	2002–2018	13 Jul 2018	36	Disc.: Cerro Tololo; Added on 21 August 2021	MPC · JPL
1	2003 QU125	MBA-M	18.55	1.1 km	multiple	2003–2021	28 Oct 2021	47	Disc.: Cerro Tololo; Added on 30 September 2021	MPC · JPL
0	2003 QB126	MBA-I	19.09	450 m	multiple	2002–2021	09 May 2021	24	Disc.: Pan-STARRS; Added on 5 November 2021	MPC · JPL
0	2003 QE126	MBA-I	18.92	490 m	multiple	2003–2021	09 Nov 2021	51	Disc.: No observations Added on 5 November 2021	MPC · JPL
0	2003 QH126	MBA-M	18.1	1.3 km	multiple	2003–2021	07 Sep 2021	26	Disc.: Cerro Tololo Obs. Added on 24 December 2021	MPC · JPL

back to top

== R ==
U	Designation	Class	Physical		Observations				Description and notes	Ref
U	Designation	Class	H	D	Opp.	Arc	Last	Used	Description and notes	Ref
6	2003 RL	MCA	20.4	350 m	single	31 days	03 Oct 2003	38	Disc.: LINEAR	MPC · JPL
0	2003 RS1	APO	21.7	160 m	multiple	2003–2017	27 Jul 2017	280	Disc.: LINEAR; Potentially hazardous object	MPC · JPL
5	2003 RE2	AMO	23.0	89 m	single	46 days	19 Oct 2003	49	Disc.: LINEAR	MPC · JPL
5	2003 RB5	APO	21.2	200 m	single	15 days	19 Sep 2003	237	Disc.: LINEAR; Potentially hazardous object	MPC · JPL
7	2003 RD5	AMO	23.4	74 m	single	17 days	18 Sep 2003	21	Disc.: LINEAR	MPC · JPL
–	2003 RE5	MCA	22.5	94 m	single	1 day	05 Sep 2003	12	Disc.: LPL/Spacewatch II	MPC · JPL
1	2003 RY5	MCA	17.2	2.2 km	multiple	2003–2021	18 Jan 2021	169	Disc.: LINEAR	MPC · JPL
0	2003 RL10	AMO	19.55	470 m	multiple	2003–2026	23 Jul 2026	178	Disc.: LINEAR	MPC · JPL
0	2003 RM11	Asteroid	18.1	1.3 km	multiple	2003–2020	26 Jul 2020	67	Disc.: NEAT; MCA at MPC	MPC · JPL
3	2003 RU11	ATE	25.5	28 m	single	4 days	17 Sep 2003	31	Disc.: LINEAR	MPC · JPL
1	2003 RW_{11}	APO	18.7	1.5 km	multiple	2003–2016	24 Sep 2016	158	Disc.: Table Mountain Obs.	MPC · JPL

back to top
