= List of unnumbered minor planets: 2003 W (0–199) =

This is a partial list of unnumbered minor planets for principal provisional designations assigned during 16–30 November 2003. Since this period yielded a high number of provisional discoveries, it is further split into several standalone pages. As of November 2025, a total of 115 bodies remain unnumbered for this period. Objects for this year are listed on the following pages: A–E · F–G · H–L · M–R · S_{i} · S_{ii} · S_{iii} · S_{iv} · T · U_{i} · U_{ii} · U_{iii} · U_{iv} · V · W_{i} · W_{ii} and X–Y. Also see previous and next year.

Near-Earth obj.	MBA (inner)	MBA (outer)	Centaur
Mars-crosser	MBA (middle)	Jupiter trojan	Trans-Neptunian obj.
Unclassified

== W ==
U	Designation	Class	Physical		Observations				Description and notes	Ref
U	Designation	Class	H	D	Opp.	Arc	Last	Used	Description and notes	Ref
8	2003 WE	APO	24.6	43 m	single	11 days	27 Nov 2003	56	Disc.: CSS	MPC · JPL
0	2003 WG	APO	19.25	510 m	multiple	2003–2022	04 Dec 2022	187	Disc.: LONEOS; Potentially hazardous object	MPC · JPL
0	2003 WH	MBA-M	17.45	1.8 km	multiple	2003–2021	07 Nov 2021	67	Disc.: CSS	MPC · JPL
0	2003 WZ4	MBA-M	18.4	620 m	multiple	2003–2019	21 Oct 2019	58	Disc.: Spacewatch; Alt.: 2015 TB270	MPC · JPL
0	2003 WE5	MBA-M	17.3	1.0 km	multiple	2003–2020	11 Dec 2020	40	Disc.: Spacewatch	MPC · JPL
2	2003 WF5	MBA-M	19.0	470 m	multiple	2003–2011	02 Oct 2011	41	Disc.: Spacewatch; Alt.: 2007 TX297	MPC · JPL
0	2003 WP7	APO	23.2	81 m	multiple	2003–2010	09 Dec 2010	102	Disc.: Spacewatch; Alt.: 2010 WD3, 2010 XK3	MPC · JPL
–	2003 WR7	MCA	20.3	260 m	single	5 days	24 Nov 2003	31	Disc.: LINEAR	MPC · JPL
2	2003 WA8	MCA	19.75	480 m	multiple	2003-2020	13 Sep 2020	26	Disc.: NEAT	MPC · JPL
0	2003 WV12	MBA-M	17.41	980 m	multiple	2003–2021	30 Apr 2021	61	Disc.: LINEAR	MPC · JPL
0	2003 WB13	MBA-I	19.00	470 m	multiple	2003–2019	01 Jul 2019	41	Disc.: Mauna Kea Obs.	MPC · JPL
0	2003 WV13	MBA-M	18.0	1.4 km	multiple	2003–2017	22 Nov 2017	38	Disc.: Spacewatch	MPC · JPL
0	2003 WB15	MBA-I	18.94	480 m	multiple	2003–2021	29 Nov 2021	43	Disc.: Spacewatch; Alt.: 2017 OY26	MPC · JPL
0	2003 WJ16	MBA-M	17.79	1.5 km	multiple	2001–2021	28 Sep 2021	46	Disc.: Spacewatch; Added on 17 June 2021	MPC · JPL
4	2003 WP21	APO	21.5	180 m	multiple	2003–2020	17 Nov 2020	66	Disc.: LINEAR; Potentially hazardous object Alt.: 2020 VO6	MPC · JPL
7	2003 WQ21	AMO	22.4	120 m	single	18 days	08 Dec 2003	24	Disc.: CSS	MPC · JPL
0	2003 WU21	ATE	21.9	150 m	multiple	2003–2016	27 Nov 2016	125	Disc.: LINEAR	MPC · JPL
0	2003 WZ21	MCA	19.1	640 m	multiple	2003–2021	02 Jan 2021	38	Disc.: LONEOS	MPC · JPL
5	2003 WR25	APO	19.6	430 m	single	35 days	26 Dec 2003	61	Disc.: NEAT	MPC · JPL
1	2003 WW25	MCA	19.97	300 m	multiple	2003–2019	04 Jul 2019	32	Disc.: LINEAR; Alt.: 2019 KP3	MPC · JPL
1	2003 WL26	MBA-M	17.1	1.1 km	multiple	2003–2014	24 Jun 2014	32	Disc.: LINEAR	MPC · JPL
0	2003 WN26	MCA	17.89	1.5 km	multiple	2003-2024	03 Dec 2024	40	Disc.: LINEAR	MPC · JPL
6	2003 WW26	APO	22.5	110 m	single	23 days	14 Dec 2003	84	Disc.: LINEAR	MPC · JPL
8	2003 WO32	MBA-M	18.59	410 m	multiple	2003-2025	25 Dec 2025	99	Disc.: Spacewatch	MPC · JPL
0	2003 WX45	HUN	18.94	480 m	multiple	2003–2022	07 Jan 2022	85	Disc.: Spacewatch	MPC · JPL
1	2003 WA46	MCA	19.3	410 m	multiple	2003–2020	21 Jul 2020	37	Disc.: LINEAR; Alt.: 2018 YN2	MPC · JPL
0	2003 WE46	MBA-M	17.1	1.1 km	multiple	2003–2020	23 Dec 2020	45	Disc.: LINEAR; Alt.: 2007 VV297	MPC · JPL
0	2003 WT46	MBA-I	18.5	590 m	multiple	2003–2020	15 Dec 2020	33	Disc.: NEAT	MPC · JPL
0	2003 WO47	MBA-M	18.98	670 m	multiple	2003–2022	27 Jan 2022	39	Disc.: Spacewatch; Added on 29 January 2022	MPC · JPL
1	2003 WB48	MBA-M	18.0	1.4 km	multiple	2003–2018	12 Jan 2018	53	Disc.: Spacewatch	MPC · JPL
0	2003 WH48	MBA-M	18.84	720 m	multiple	2003–2020	18 Sep 2020	35	Disc.: Spacewatch	MPC · JPL
0	2003 WF49	HIL	16.4	2.9 km	multiple	2002–2018	03 Oct 2018	46	Disc.: LPL/Spacewatch II; Alt.: 2011 UA249	MPC · JPL
0	2003 WR50 = (887267)	MBA-O	17.2	2.0 km	multiple	2003–2019	25 Nov 2019	37	Disc.: LPL/Spacewatch II	MPC · JPL
1	2003 WY50	MBA-M	18.5	590 m	multiple	1999–2019	26 Sep 2019	54	Disc.: LPL/Spacewatch II; Alt.: 2015 RY42	MPC · JPL
2	2003 WG53	MBA-I	18.8	520 m	multiple	2003–2012	14 Jan 2012	25	Disc.: Spacewatch; Added on 22 July 2020	MPC · JPL
1	2003 WT54	MBA-M	17.5	940 m	multiple	2003–2015	10 Aug 2015	69	Disc.: LINEAR; Alt.: 2007 UY9	MPC · JPL
0	2003 WQ59	MBA-M	18.4	620 m	multiple	2003–2017	22 Feb 2017	45	Disc.: Spacewatch	MPC · JPL
0	2003 WV61	MBA-M	18.8	520 m	multiple	2003–2021	18 Jan 2021	23	Disc.: Spacewatch; Added on 21 August 2021	MPC · JPL
0	2003 WY69	MCA	19.23	420 m	multiple	2003–2020	06 Nov 2020	107	Disc.: CINEOS; Alt.: 2017 YH4	MPC · JPL
0	2003 WE84	MBA-M	18.2	960 m	multiple	2003–2020	14 Nov 2020	46	Disc.: LPL/Spacewatch II	MPC · JPL
1	2003 WY87	AMO	22.3	120 m	multiple	2003–2019	11 Jan 2019	59	Disc.: LINEAR	MPC · JPL
1	2003 WD88	MCA	18.1	710 m	multiple	2003–2020	12 Dec 2020	24	Disc.: NEAT	MPC · JPL
5	2003 WH98	APO	26.6	17 m	single	4 days	30 Nov 2003	36	Disc.: LINEAR	MPC · JPL
0	2003 WJ98	APO	22.9	93 m	multiple	2003–2020	06 Dec 2020	45	Disc.: LINEAR; AMO at MPC	MPC · JPL
1	2003 WW99	MBA-O	16.8	2.4 km	multiple	2003–2021	15 Jan 2021	171	Disc.: LINEAR	MPC · JPL
0	2003 WQ105	MBA-O	17.1	2.1 km	multiple	2003–2019	26 Sep 2019	25	Disc.: LPL/Spacewatch II; Added on 21 August 2021; Alt.: 2019 PR57	MPC · JPL
0	2003 WR105	MBA-O	17.4	1.8 km	multiple	2003–2021	18 Jan 2021	52	Disc.: LPL/Spacewatch II	MPC · JPL
1	2003 WQ110	MBA-O	17.45	1.8 km	multiple	2003–2020	28 Jan 2020	83	Disc.: LINEAR	MPC · JPL
0	2003 WR128	MBA-M	17.6	900 m	multiple	2003–2015	12 Sep 2015	17	Disc.: Spacewatch	MPC · JPL
0	2003 WD145 = (887268)	MBA-M	18.1	1.0 km	multiple	2003–2020	16 Nov 2020	121	Disc.: LINEAR; Alt.: 2016 WN26	MPC · JPL
0	2003 WF147	HUN	18.78	520 m	multiple	2003–2021	16 Nov 2021	57	Disc.: LPL/Spacewatch II; Alt.: 2015 GD1	MPC · JPL
0	2003 WO151	APO	20.4	300 m	multiple	2003–2005	05 Dec 2005	41	Disc.: Spacewatch	MPC · JPL
0	2003 WE152	MBA-O	18.00	1.4 km	multiple	2003–2021	09 Feb 2021	41	Disc.: Spacewatch; Added on 5 November 2021; Alt.: 2014 WU322	MPC · JPL
6	2003 WT153	ATE	28.0	9 m	single	3 days	01 Dec 2003	44	Disc.: LPL/Spacewatch II	MPC · JPL
0	2003 WU153	AMO	19.16	520 m	multiple	2003–2022	23 Jan 2022	73	Disc.: LINEAR	MPC · JPL
6	2003 WY153	APO	24.4	47 m	single	18 days	17 Dec 2003	48	Disc.: LINEAR	MPC · JPL
6	2003 WE157	APO	21.2	200 m	single	162 days	09 May 2004	35	Disc.: Spacewatch	MPC · JPL
0	2003 WC158	APO	20.4	300 m	multiple	2003–2016	03 Jun 2016	120	Disc.: LONEOS; Potentially hazardous object	MPC · JPL
0	2003 WZ159	MBA-M	18.21	1.3 km	multiple	2003–2021	25 Nov 2021	60	Disc.: LPL/Spacewatch II; Added on 22 July 2020	MPC · JPL
0	2003 WJ160	MBA-I	19.21	430 m	multiple	2003–2022	07 Jan 2022	53	Disc.: LPL/Spacewatch II	MPC · JPL
0	2003 WU160	MBA-I	19.2	430 m	multiple	2003–2019	25 Sep 2019	41	Disc.: LPL/Spacewatch II; Added on 22 July 2020; Alt.: 2016 UV126	MPC · JPL
3	2003 WG161	MBA-O	18.29	1.2 km	multiple	2003-2020	10 Dec 2020	24	Disc.: LPL/Spacewatch II	MPC · JPL
1	2003 WP163	MBA-M	18.41	1.2 km	multiple	2003–2021	25 Nov 2021	39	Disc.: Spacewatch	MPC · JPL
0	2003 WR163	MBA-M	18.41	1.2 km	multiple	2003–2021	29 Nov 2021	55	Disc.: Spacewatch; Alt.: 2012 XA90	MPC · JPL
0	2003 WU163	MBA-I	18.91	490 m	multiple	2003–2021	03 Dec 2021	63	Disc.: Spacewatch; Added on 5 November 2021	MPC · JPL
0	2003 WQ164	MBA-O	17.93	1.4 km	multiple	2003–2020	29 Apr 2020	38	Disc.: Spacewatch	MPC · JPL
1	2003 WM165	MBA-I	19.54	370 m	multiple	2003–2021	09 Dec 2021	38	Disc.: Spacewatch; Added on 24 December 2021	MPC · JPL
0	2003 WR165 = (887269)	MBA-O	17.5	1.8 km	multiple	2003–2021	15 Apr 2021	56	Disc.: Spacewatch	MPC · JPL
1	2003 WG166	Asteroid	17.4	2.0 km	multiple	2003–2015	01 Dec 2015	82	Disc.: LINEAR; MBA at MPC	MPC · JPL
1	2003 WH166	APO	22.0	140 m	multiple	2003–2012	27 May 2012	167	Disc.: Spacewatch; Potentially hazardous object	MPC · JPL
3	2003 WX172	MBA-M	18.4	1.2 km	multiple	2003–2021	06 Oct 2021	19	Disc.: LPL/Spacewatch II; Added on 30 September 2021; Alt.: 2021 QF40	MPC · JPL
2	2003 WZ172	MBA-I	18.48	600 m	multiple	2003–2021	30 Jun 2021	21	Disc.: LPL/Spacewatch II; Added on 17 January 2021	MPC · JPL
1	2003 WS173	MCA	19.1	450 m	multiple	2003–2011	25 Jul 2011	22	Disc.: Spacewatch	MPC · JPL
0	2003 WW173	MBA-I	19.3	410 m	multiple	2003–2019	27 Oct 2019	38	Disc.: LPL/Spacewatch II	MPC · JPL
2	2003 WV174	MBA-O	17.2	2.0 km	multiple	2003–2021	05 Jan 2021	35	Disc.: LPL/Spacewatch II; Added on 17 January 2021	MPC · JPL
0	2003 WJ176	MBA-I	19.2	430 m	multiple	2003–2020	16 Oct 2020	31	Disc.: Spacewatch; Added on 11 May 2021; Alt.: 2020 QC79	MPC · JPL
0	2003 WG177 = (887270)	MBA-I	18.99	470 m	multiple	2003–2021	24 Nov 2021	65	Disc.: Kitt Peak Obs.	MPC · JPL
0	2003 WD178	MBA-M	17.7	860 m	multiple	1999–2019	27 Oct 2019	58	Disc.: Kitt Peak Obs.	MPC · JPL
0	2003 WU178	MBA-I	19.27	590 m	multiple	2003-2025	30 May 2025	52	Disc.: Kitt Peak Obs.	MPC · JPL
0	2003 WV178	MBA-I	19.8	330 m	multiple	2003–2018	02 Nov 2018	26	Disc.: Kitt Peak Obs. Added on 24 December 2021	MPC · JPL
3	2003 WX178	MBA-O	19.61	700 m	multiple	2003-2024	04 Oct 2024	15	Disc.: Kitt Peak Obs.	MPC · JPL
0	2003 WB179	MBA-O	17.9	1.5 km	multiple	2003–2019	24 Oct 2019	27	Disc.: Kitt Peak Obs. Added on 9 March 2021; Alt.: 2019 SN68	MPC · JPL
0	2003 WJ179	MBA-I	18.93	490 m	multiple	2003–2021	30 Jun 2021	48	Disc.: Kitt Peak Obs.	MPC · JPL
0	2003 WO179	MBA-M	18.3	920 m	multiple	2003–2020	17 Sep 2020	25	Disc.: LPL/Spacewatch II	MPC · JPL
1	2003 WU180	MBA-I	19.30	410 m	multiple	2003–2020	23 Aug 2020	24	Disc.: Kitt Peak Obs. Added on 17 January 2021	MPC · JPL
0	2003 WK181	MBA-M	18.32	910 m	multiple	2003–2020	10 Nov 2020	63	Disc.: Kitt Peak Obs. Added on 17 January 2021	MPC · JPL
2	2003 WD182	MCA	19.23	310 m	multiple	2003-2024	01 Feb 2024	39	Disc.: Kitt Peak Obs.	MPC · JPL
0	2003 WQ182	MBA-O	17.8	1.5 km	multiple	2003–2020	26 Jan 2020	31	Disc.: Kitt Peak Obs.	MPC · JPL
0	2003 WZ183	HUN	19.48	380 m	multiple	2003–2021	31 May 2021	39	Disc.: Kitt Peak Obs.	MPC · JPL
E	2003 WS184	TNO	7.4	114 km	single	4 days	24 Nov 2003	4	Disc.: Kitt Peak Obs. LoUTNOs, cubewano?	MPC · JPL
–	2003 WT184	MBA-I	19.1	450 m	single	31 days	21 Dec 2003	7	Disc.: Kitt Peak Obs.	MPC · JPL
0	2003 WC185	MBA-I	19.43	390 m	multiple	2003–2021	09 Dec 2021	46	Disc.: Kitt Peak Obs. Alt.: 2006 OE31	MPC · JPL
1	2003 WD185	MBA-O	17.2	2.0 km	multiple	2002–2021	16 Jan 2021	37	Disc.: Kitt Peak Obs.	MPC · JPL
0	2003 WQ185	MBA-O	17.3	1.9 km	multiple	2003–2019	28 Dec 2019	42	Disc.: Kitt Peak Obs.	MPC · JPL
0	2003 WS186	MBA-M	18.3	920 m	multiple	2003–2020	15 Sep 2020	45	Disc.: Kitt Peak Obs. Added on 19 October 2020	MPC · JPL
2	2003 WU186	MBA-M	18.9	700 m	multiple	2003–2020	11 Nov 2020	27	Disc.: Kitt Peak Obs. Added on 17 January 2021	MPC · JPL
0	2003 WD187	MBA-O	17.4	1.8 km	multiple	2003–2019	02 Nov 2019	43	Disc.: Kitt Peak Obs. Added on 9 March 2021; Alt.: 2019 SY24	MPC · JPL
0	2003 WM187	MBA-M	18.9	700 m	multiple	2003–2020	14 Dec 2020	45	Disc.: Kitt Peak Obs. Added on 17 January 2021	MPC · JPL
3	2003 WS187	MBA-M	18.8	520 m	multiple	2003–2019	28 Aug 2019	43	Disc.: Kitt Peak Obs.	MPC · JPL
1	2003 WW187	MBA-O	17.9	1.5 km	multiple	2003–2019	29 Oct 2019	28	Disc.: Kitt Peak Obs. Added on 22 July 2020	MPC · JPL
0	2003 WE188	MBA-I	19.2	430 m	multiple	2002–2018	19 Mar 2018	19	Disc.: Kitt Peak Obs.	MPC · JPL
1	2003 WN188	CEN	14.0	10 km	multiple	2003–2005	04 Jul 2005	205	Disc.: CSS, albedo: 0.050; BR-mag: 1.26	MPC · JPL
E	2003 WQ188	TNO	5.9	227 km	single	99 days	27 Feb 2004	5	Disc.: Kitt Peak Obs. LoUTNOs, cubewano?	MPC · JPL
9	2003 WS188	TNO	9.0	75 km	single	1 day	21 Nov 2003	3	Disc.: Kitt Peak Obs. LoUTNOs, plutino?	MPC · JPL
9	2003 WV188	TNO	7.1	130 km	single	4 days	24 Nov 2003	3	Disc.: Kitt Peak Obs. LoUTNOs, cubewano?	MPC · JPL
9	2003 WW188	TNO	7.4	114 km	single	3 days	24 Nov 2003	3	Disc.: Kitt Peak Obs. LoUTNOs, cubewano?	MPC · JPL
4	2003 WA191	TNO	8.29	104 km	multiple	2003–2020	09 Dec 2020	25	Disc.: Kitt Peak Obs. LoUTNOs, plutino	MPC · JPL
–	2003 WN193	TNO	8.5	94 km	single	42 days	29 Dec 2003	12	Disc.: Cerro Tololo; LoUTNOs, plutino	MPC · JPL
4	2003 WO193	TNO	8.2	108 km	multiple	2003–2017	01 Jan 2017	29	Disc.: Cerro Tololo; LoUTNOs, plutino	MPC · JPL
0	2003 WZ193	MBA-M	18.0	1.1 km	multiple	2003–2021	06 Jan 2021	74	Disc.: Spacewatch	MPC · JPL
0	2003 WH195	MBA-O	17.2	2.0 km	multiple	2003–2021	04 Jan 2021	42	Disc.: Kitt Peak Obs. Added on 24 August 2020; Alt.: 2019 UB33	MPC · JPL
0	2003 WN195	MBA-I	18.61	560 m	multiple	2003–2021	27 Nov 2021	105	Disc.: SDSS	MPC · JPL

back to top
