= List of unnumbered minor planets: 2003 H–L =

This is a partial list of unnumbered minor planets for principal provisional designations assigned between 16 April and 15 June 2003. As of November 2025, a total of 122 bodies remain unnumbered for this period. Objects for this year are listed on the following pages: A–E · F–G · H–L · M–R · S_{i} · S_{ii} · S_{iii} · S_{iv} · T · U_{i} · U_{ii} · U_{iii} · U_{iv} · V · W_{i} · W_{ii} and X–Y. Also see previous and next year.

Near-Earth obj.	MBA (inner)	MBA (outer)	Centaur
Mars-crosser	MBA (middle)	Jupiter trojan	Trans-Neptunian obj.
Unclassified

== H ==
U	Designation	Class	Physical		Observations				Description and notes	Ref
U	Designation	Class	H	D	Opp.	Arc	Last	Used	Description and notes	Ref
0	2003 HM	ATE	21.8	160 m	multiple	2003–2020	30 Jan 2020	69	Disc.: LINEAR; Potentially hazardous object	MPC · JPL
0	2003 HN	APO	19.9	370 m	multiple	2003–2006	28 Oct 2006	340	Disc.: AMOS	MPC · JPL
0	2003 HZ	MCA	17.61	1.7 km	multiple	2003–2019	10 Jul 2019	145	Disc.: LINEAR; Alt.: 2019 NE4	MPC · JPL
1	2003 HC2	HUN	18.7	540 m	multiple	2003–2020	22 Nov 2020	35	Disc.: Spacewatch; Added on 17 January 2021	MPC · JPL
1	2003 HE2	MBA-I	20.2	230 m	multiple	2003-2022	24 Jun 2022	29	Disc.: Spacewatch	MPC · JPL
0	2003 HD5	MBA-I	19.1	450 m	multiple	2003–2020	23 Jan 2020	42	Disc.: Spacewatch; Alt.: 2017 HE65	MPC · JPL
5	2003 HW10	APO	27.0	14 m	single	3 days	28 Apr 2003	94	Disc.: LPL/Spacewatch II	MPC · JPL
0	2003 HN16	APO	22.15	110 m	multiple	2003–2022	19 May 2022	85	Disc.: LINEAR; AMO at MPC	MPC · JPL
0	2003 HX17	MBA-I	18.4	620 m	multiple	2003–2020	17 Jun 2020	38	Disc.: Spacewatch; Added on 22 July 2020	MPC · JPL
0	2003 HK19	MBA-I	19.2	430 m	multiple	2003–2020	27 Apr 2020	24	Disc.: Spacewatch; Added on 19 October 2020	MPC · JPL
0	2003 HP24	MBA-I	18.4	620 m	multiple	2003–2019	05 Nov 2019	35	Disc.: LPL/Spacewatch II; Added on 21 August 2021; Alt.: 2015 RB336	MPC · JPL
3	2003 HO32	MCA	22.1	110 m	multiple	2003–2006	04 May 2006	41	Disc.: Spacewatch; Alt.: 2006 JY5	MPC · JPL
0	2003 HP32	APO	19.6	430 m	multiple	2003–2012	22 May 2012	64	Disc.: Spacewatch	MPC · JPL
6	2003 HT42	ATE	24.8	39 m	single	12 days	11 May 2003	110	Disc.: LINEAR	MPC · JPL
3	2003 HX56	TNO	7.1	158 km	multiple	2003–2019	06 Jun 2019	23	Disc.: Mauna Kea Obs. LoUTNOs, other TNO, BR-mag: 1.01	MPC · JPL
3	2003 HZ56	TNO	7.5	105 km	multiple	2003–2013	14 May 2013	17	Disc.: Mauna Kea Obs. LoUTNOs, cubewano (cold)	MPC · JPL
4	2003 HA57	TNO	8.1	113 km	multiple	2003–2019	07 May 2019	17	Disc.: Mauna Kea Obs. LoUTNOs, plutino	MPC · JPL
4	2003 HD57	TNO	7.9	124 km	multiple	2003–2014	01 May 2014	23	Disc.: Mauna Kea Obs. LoUTNOs, plutino	MPC · JPL
4	2003 HE57	TNO	7.3	178 km	multiple	2003–2015	26 Apr 2015	25	Disc.: Mauna Kea Obs. LoUTNOs, cubewano (hot)	MPC · JPL
3	2003 HF57	TNO	8.6	90 km	multiple	2003–2017	29 May 2017	27	Disc.: Mauna Kea Obs. LoUTNOs, plutino	MPC · JPL
4	2003 HH57	TNO	7.4	110 km	multiple	2003–2013	14 May 2013	19	Disc.: Mauna Kea Obs. LoUTNOs, cubewano (cold)	MPC · JPL
E	2003 HJ57	TNO	8.3	103 km	single	1 day	27 Apr 2003	4	Disc.: Mauna Kea Obs. LoUTNOs, plutino?	MPC · JPL
9	2003 HK57	TNO	8.0	86 km	single	1 day	27 Apr 2003	4	Disc.: Mauna Kea Obs. LoUTNOs, cubewano?	MPC · JPL
9	2003 HL57	TNO	6.3	189 km	single	1 day	27 Apr 2003	7	Disc.: Mauna Kea Obs. LoUTNOs, cubewano?	MPC · JPL
9	2003 HN57	TNO	7.5	109 km	single	34 days	30 May 2003	7	Disc.: Mauna Kea Obs. LoUTNOs, cubewano?	MPC · JPL
3	2003 HO57	TNO	8.0	83 km	multiple	2003–2019	05 Apr 2019	15	Disc.: Mauna Kea Obs. LoUTNOs, cubewano (cold)	MPC · JPL
9	2003 HP57	TNO	6.4	218 km	single	1 day	27 Apr 2003	4	Disc.: Mauna Kea Obs. LoUTNOs, other TNO	MPC · JPL
2	2003 HD61	MBA-M	18.70	540 m	multiple	2003–2020	17 Aug 2020	53	Disc.: Spacewatch	MPC · JPL
0	2003 HD62	MBA-I	17.9	780 m	multiple	2003–2018	14 Jun 2018	32	Disc.: SDSS	MPC · JPL
0	2003 HH62	MBA-I	18.6	570 m	multiple	2003–2017	20 Apr 2017	36	Disc.: Spacewatch	MPC · JPL
0	2003 HN62	MBA-I	19.0	470 m	multiple	2003–2020	14 Sep 2020	40	Disc.: Spacewatch	MPC · JPL
0	2003 HS62	HUN	18.8	520 m	multiple	2003–2019	08 Jan 2019	24	Disc.: SDSS	MPC · JPL
0	2003 HU64	MBA-I	19.25	420 m	multiple	2003–2021	09 Jul 2021	43	Disc.: Spacewatch	MPC · JPL
0	2003 HB65	MBA-I	18.6	570 m	multiple	2003–2019	23 Oct 2019	40	Disc.: Spacewatch	MPC · JPL
0	2003 HR65	MBA-M	18.5	840 m	multiple	2003–2020	28 Apr 2020	44	Disc.: Spacewatch; Added on 22 July 2020	MPC · JPL
0	2003 HU65	MBA-I	19.03	460 m	multiple	2003–2021	06 Oct 2021	42	Disc.: Spacewatch; Added on 22 July 2020	MPC · JPL
0	2003 HX65	MBA-I	18.6	570 m	multiple	2003–2020	22 Aug 2020	49	Disc.: Spacewatch; Added on 19 October 2020	MPC · JPL
0	2003 HA66	HUN	19.62	350 m	multiple	2003–2021	03 Dec 2021	32	Disc.: SDSS; Added on 9 March 2021	MPC · JPL
1	2003 HC66	MBA-M	19.02	870 m	multiple	2003–2021	12 Jun 2021	34	Disc.: Spacewatch; Added on 17 June 2021	MPC · JPL
1	2003 HE66	MBA-O	17.92	1.6 km	multiple	2003–2014	24 Jun 2014	42	Disc.: SDSS; Added on 24 December 2021	MPC · JPL

back to top

== J ==
U	Designation	Class	Physical		Observations				Description and notes	Ref
U	Designation	Class	H	D	Opp.	Arc	Last	Used	Description and notes	Ref
0	2003 JB2	MBA-M	18.11	1.0 km	multiple	2003–2021	04 Aug 2021	36	Disc.: LPL/Spacewatch II	MPC · JPL
8	2003 JX2	APO	26.4	19 m	single	2 days	03 May 2003	31	Disc.: LINEAR	MPC · JPL
8	2003 JY2	APO	24.6	43 m	single	4 days	06 May 2003	35	Disc.: LINEAR	MPC · JPL
3	2003 JB4	MBA-M	17.88	790 m	multiple	2003–2021	30 Oct 2021	39	Disc.: KLENOT	MPC · JPL
7	2003 JG4	AMO	22.9	93 m	single	29 days	01 Jun 2003	36	Disc.: Spacewatch	MPC · JPL
6	2003 JD11	APO	24.3	49 m	single	6 days	11 May 2003	97	Disc.: LINEAR	MPC · JPL
0	2003 JD13	AMO	20.00	360 m	multiple	2003–2021	01 Nov 2021	161	Disc.: LINEAR	MPC · JPL
3	2003 JF13	MCA	19.9	310 m	multiple	2003–2007	26 Apr 2007	42	Disc.: Spacewatch	MPC · JPL
7	2003 JO14	APO	25.2	32 m	single	2 days	11 May 2003	41	Disc.: LINEAR	MPC · JPL
6	2003 JP14	APO	22.3	120 m	single	30 days	08 Jun 2003	51	Disc.: LINEAR	MPC · JPL
0	2003 JV14	APO	21.41	180 m	multiple	2003-2023	15 Oct 2023	92	Disc.: Spacewatch	MPC · JPL
0	2003 JP15	MBA-I	18.8	520 m	multiple	2003–2020	22 Oct 2020	48	Disc.: LPL/Spacewatch II; Added on 17 January 2021; Alt.: 2007 UH74	MPC · JPL
1	2003 JA17	MCA	17.94	940 m	multiple	2003-2024	29 Sep 2024	62	Disc.: LINEAR; Alt.: 2024 RO16	MPC · JPL
0	2003 JC17	APO	17.88	940 m	multiple	2003–2021	11 Jul 2021	122	Disc.: LINEAR; NEO larger than 1 kilometer	MPC · JPL
5	2003 JD17	AMO	21.1	210 m	single	109 days	29 Aug 2003	40	Disc.: LINEAR	MPC · JPL
1	2003 JC20	MBA-M	18.1	710 m	multiple	2003–2020	13 Sep 2020	55	Disc.: LPL/Spacewatch II	MPC · JPL
0	2003 JY20	MBA-M	18.1	1.0 km	multiple	2003–2020	26 Apr 2020	48	Disc.: Spacewatch; Added on 22 July 2020	MPC · JPL
0	2003 JE21	MBA-I	19.00	470 m	multiple	2003–2021	01 May 2021	44	Disc.: Spacewatch; Added on 11 May 2021	MPC · JPL
0	2003 JG21	MBA-I	18.7	540 m	multiple	2003–2021	12 Jun 2021	93	Disc.: LPL/Spacewatch II; Added on 17 June 2021	MPC · JPL
0	2003 JH21	MBA-I	18.4	620 m	multiple	2003–2018	11 Apr 2018	24	Disc.: Spacewatch; Added on 21 August 2021	MPC · JPL

back to top

== K ==
U	Designation	Class	Physical		Observations				Description and notes	Ref
U	Designation	Class	H	D	Opp.	Arc	Last	Used	Description and notes	Ref
–	2003 KT2	MBA-M	18.9	920 m	single	3 days	25 May 2003	16	Disc.: VATT	MPC · JPL
–	2003 KH3	MBA-I	19.6	360 m	single	3 days	26 May 2003	9	Disc.: LPL/Spacewatch II	MPC · JPL
5	2003 KF4	APO	23.3	78 m	single	15 days	08 Jun 2003	107	Disc.: Desert Eagle Obs. AMO at MPC	MPC · JPL
3	2003 KT5	MBA-M	18.8	730 m	multiple	2003–2020	27 Apr 2020	26	Disc.: Spacewatch; Added on 22 July 2020	MPC · JPL
1	2003 KW5	MBA-M	19.09	450 m	multiple	2003–2020	20 Oct 2020	45	Disc.: Spacewatch; Added on 19 October 2020	MPC · JPL
0	2003 KY5	MBA-I	18.4	620 m	multiple	2003–2019	03 Oct 2019	42	Disc.: Spacewatch; Alt.: 2018 FB10	MPC · JPL
1	2003 KY7	MBA-M	18.73	700 m	multiple	2003–2025	21 Jun 2025	73	Disc.: Spacewatch; Added on 5 November 2021; Alt.: 2021 QF45	MPC · JPL
0	2003 KQ18	AMO	20.9	230 m	multiple	2003–2010	12 Jun 2010	108	Disc.: LINEAR	MPC · JPL
3	2003 KO20	TNO	6.6	159 km	multiple	2003–2016	29 May 2016	12	Disc.: Cerro Tololo; LoUTNOs, cubewano (cold)	MPC · JPL
E	2003 KP20	TNO	7.2	125 km	single	39 days	08 Jul 2003	5	Disc.: Cerro Tololo; LoUTNOs, cubewano?	MPC · JPL
E	2003 KQ20	CEN	13.1	13 km	single	1 day	31 May 2003	3	Disc.: Cerro Tololo	MPC · JPL
0	2003 KB24	MBA-I	18.9	490 m	multiple	2003–2021	13 Apr 2021	38	Disc.: Cerro Tololo; Added on 17 June 2021; Alt.: 2021 EL20	MPC · JPL
0	2003 KG24	MBA-I	18.9	490 m	multiple	2003–2020	16 Dec 2020	26	Disc.: Cerro Tololo; Added on 9 March 2021; Alt.: 2019 JC20	MPC · JPL
1	2003 KB25	MBA-O	17.39	1.9 km	multiple	2003–2021	14 Jul 2021	43	Disc.: Cerro Tololo; Added on 21 August 2021; Alt.: 2015 KM73	MPC · JPL
3	2003 KS25	MBA-O	17.5	1.8 km	multiple	2003–2020	23 Oct 2020	13	Disc.: Cerro Tololo; Added on 30 September 2021	MPC · JPL
1	2003 KV25	MBA-O	17.80	1.5 km	multiple	2003–2022	27 Jan 2022	47	Disc.: Cerro Tololo; Added on 17 January 2021; Alt.: 2017 BM161	MPC · JPL
2	2003 KY25	MBA-I	19.2	430 m	multiple	2003–2021	28 Sep 2021	24	Disc.: Cerro Tololo; Added on 24 December 2021	MPC · JPL
0	2003 KG26	MBA-M	18.1	1.3 km	multiple	2003–2020	25 May 2020	30	Disc.: Cerro Tololo; Added on 17 January 2021; Alt.: 2004 VU100	MPC · JPL
0	2003 KB27	MBA-M	18.31	920 m	multiple	2003–2021	30 Sep 2021	25	Disc.: Cerro Tololo; Alt.: 2015 FZ196	MPC · JPL
0	2003 KG27	MBA-O	17.24	2.0 km	multiple	2003–2021	26 Nov 2021	37	Disc.: Cerro Tololo; Added on 5 November 2021; Alt.: 2019 KJ49	MPC · JPL
1	2003 KP27	MBA-M	18.55	820 m	multiple	2003–2021	24 Oct 2021	71	Disc.: Cerro Tololo	MPC · JPL
0	2003 KQ31	MBA-I	18.3	650 m	multiple	2003–2020	18 Aug 2020	66	Disc.: Spacewatch; Added on 22 July 2020	MPC · JPL
0	2003 KY32	MCA	18.8	520 m	multiple	2003–2019	25 Aug 2019	22	Disc.: Spacewatch	MPC · JPL
0	2003 KP38	MBA-I	19.1	450 m	multiple	2003–2020	22 Jun 2020	35	Disc.: Cerro Tololo	MPC · JPL
1	2003 KQ38	MBA-M	17.7	1.6 km	multiple	2003–2017	23 Sep 2017	35	Disc.: Spacewatch	MPC · JPL
0	2003 KS38	HUN	18.7	540 m	multiple	2003–2019	09 Jan 2019	27	Disc.: LPL/Spacewatch II	MPC · JPL
1	2003 KJ39	MBA-I	18.0	750 m	multiple	2003–2019	02 Nov 2019	34	Disc.: Spacewatch	MPC · JPL
0	2003 KL39	MBA-O	17.2	2.0 km	multiple	2003–2019	07 Apr 2019	33	Disc.: Cerro Tololo	MPC · JPL
0	2003 KO39	HUN	18.9	490 m	multiple	2003–2019	06 Mar 2019	31	Disc.: SDSS	MPC · JPL
0	2003 KP39	MBA-I	18.5	590 m	multiple	2003–2019	23 Oct 2019	26	Disc.: Spacewatch	MPC · JPL
1	2003 KQ39	MBA-I	18.4	620 m	multiple	2003–2016	24 Dec 2016	35	Disc.: Cerro Tololo	MPC · JPL
0	2003 KV39	MBA-I	19.32	410 m	multiple	2003–2021	29 Oct 2021	60	Disc.: Cerro Tololo	MPC · JPL
0	2003 KW39	MBA-M	18.2	680 m	multiple	2003–2019	08 Feb 2019	25	Disc.: Cerro Tololo	MPC · JPL
0	2003 KD40	MBA-M	18.4	880 m	multiple	2003–2020	22 Apr 2020	35	Disc.: Cerro Tololo	MPC · JPL
0	2003 KE40	MBA-M	17.7	1.6 km	multiple	2003–2019	19 Dec 2019	63	Disc.: Cerro Tololo	MPC · JPL
0	2003 KL40	MBA-O	17.27	2.0 km	multiple	2003–2021	05 Jul 2021	36	Disc.: Spacewatch; Added on 13 September 2020	MPC · JPL

back to top

== L ==
U	Designation	Class	Physical		Observations				Description and notes	Ref
U	Designation	Class	H	D	Opp.	Arc	Last	Used	Description and notes	Ref
6	2003 LH	ATE	25.2	32 m	single	59 days	31 Jul 2003	50	Disc.: LINEAR	MPC · JPL
6	2003 LW1	AMO	23.2	81 m	single	12 days	15 Jun 2003	76	Disc.: LINEAR	MPC · JPL
0	2003 LW2	APO	25.8	25 m	multiple	2003–2021	01 Jun 2021	70	Disc.: LINEAR	MPC · JPL
2	2003 LR3	MCA	22.08	94 m	multiple	2003-2021	05 Jul 2021	29	Disc.: Spacewatch	MPC · JPL
0	2003 LE6	MBA-I	18.7	540 m	multiple	2003–2021	11 Jun 2021	45	Disc.: Table Mountain Obs. Alt.: 2010 NT144	MPC · JPL
0	2003 LK6	MBA-O	16.30	3.1 km	multiple	2003–2021	01 Dec 2021	51	Disc.: Siding Spring Obs. Added on 13 September 2020	MPC · JPL
0	2003 LN6	ATE	24.83	43 m	multiple	2003–2026	12 Jun 2026	158	Disc.: LINEAR	MPC · JPL
E	2003 LZ6	TNO	6.5	172 km	single	1 day	02 Jun 2003	3	Disc.: Cerro Tololo; LoUTNOs, cubewano?	MPC · JPL
2	2003 LA7	TNO	6.5	181 km	multiple	2003–2008	12 Mar 2008	18	Disc.: Cerro Tololo; LoUTNOs, res · 1:4	MPC · JPL
E	2003 LC7	TNO	6.2	197 km	single	37 days	08 Jul 2003	5	Disc.: Cerro Tololo; LoUTNOs, cubewano?	MPC · JPL
E	2003 LD7	TNO	6.9	143 km	single	36 days	07 Jul 2003	5	Disc.: Cerro Tololo; LoUTNOs, cubewano?	MPC · JPL
E	2003 LE7	TNO	7.6	143 km	single	1 day	02 Jun 2003	3	Disc.: Cerro Tololo; LoUTNOs, plutino?	MPC · JPL
E	2003 LF7	TNO	7.9	124 km	single	37 days	08 Jul 2003	6	Disc.: Cerro Tololo; LoUTNOs, plutino?	MPC · JPL
E	2003 LH7	CEN	12.5	18 km	single	1 day	02 Jun 2003	3	Disc.: Cerro Tololo	MPC · JPL
0	2003 LY7	MBA-M	18.3	1.2 km	multiple	2003–2021	08 Jun 2021	31	Disc.: Cerro Tololo	MPC · JPL
0	2003 LC9	MBA-I	19.1	450 m	multiple	2003–2018	18 Aug 2018	23	Disc.: Cerro Tololo	MPC · JPL
3	2003 LD9	TNO	6.8	182 km	multiple	2003–2019	06 Jun 2019	15	Disc.: Cerro Tololo; LoUTNOs, other TNO	MPC · JPL
0	2003 LD10	MBA-I	18.3	650 m	multiple	2003–2018	11 Jul 2018	41	Disc.: Spacewatch	MPC · JPL
0	2003 LF10	MBA-M	18.3	920 m	multiple	2003–2020	24 Jun 2020	34	Disc.: Cerro Tololo	MPC · JPL
1	2003 LT10	MBA-M	18.4	620 m	multiple	2003–2020	12 Sep 2020	56	Disc.: Spacewatch	MPC · JPL
1	2003 LU10	MBA-M	18.1	710 m	multiple	2003–2019	03 Jul 2019	43	Disc.: Cerro Tololo	MPC · JPL
1	2003 LJ11	MBA-I	18.3	650 m	multiple	2003–2019	06 Sep 2019	33	Disc.: Cerro Tololo	MPC · JPL
1	2003 LK11	MBA-I	18.1	710 m	multiple	2003–2019	29 Sep 2019	35	Disc.: LPL/Spacewatch II	MPC · JPL
0	2003 LM11	MBA-M	17.3	1.5 km	multiple	2003–2020	16 Jun 2020	37	Disc.: LPL/Spacewatch II	MPC · JPL
0	2003 LV11	MBA-I	18.5	590 m	multiple	2003–2019	29 Sep 2019	32	Disc.: Spacewatch	MPC · JPL
2	2003 LZ11	MBA-M	18.3	650 m	multiple	2003–2020	10 Sep 2020	35	Disc.: SDSS; Added on 19 October 2020	MPC · JPL

back to top
