= List of unnumbered minor planets: 2003 F–G =

This is a partial list of unnumbered minor planets for principal provisional designations assigned between 16 March and 15 April 2003. As of November 2025, a total of 84 bodies remain unnumbered for this period. Objects for this year are listed on the following pages: A–E · F–G · H–L · M–R · S_{i} · S_{ii} · S_{iii} · S_{iv} · T · U_{i} · U_{ii} · U_{iii} · U_{iv} · V · W_{i} · W_{ii} and X–Y. Also see previous and next year.

Near-Earth obj.	MBA (inner)	MBA (outer)	Centaur
Mars-crosser	MBA (middle)	Jupiter trojan	Trans-Neptunian obj.
Unclassified

== F ==
U	Designation	Class	Physical		Observations				Description and notes	Ref
U	Designation	Class	H	D	Opp.	Arc	Last	Used	Description and notes	Ref
9	2003 FK1	ATE	23.0	89 m	single	8 days	31 Mar 2003	27	Disc.: LINEAR	MPC · JPL
8	2003 FR2	MCA	20.52	230 m	single	12 days	06 Apr 2003	31	Disc.: NEAT	MPC · JPL
1	2003 FU2	MBA-I	18.3	650 m	multiple	2003–2020	17 Apr 2020	28	Disc.: NEAT	MPC · JPL
3	2003 FU3	ATE	20.9	230 m	multiple	2003–2018	20 Apr 2018	125	Disc.: LONEOS	MPC · JPL
7	2003 FV3	AMO	20.8	250 m	single	26 days	21 Apr 2003	63	Disc.: NEAT	MPC · JPL
8	2003 FB5	APO	23.5	71 m	single	7 days	02 Apr 2003	88	Disc.: CINEOS	MPC · JPL
0	2003 FF5	APO	23.3	78 m	multiple	2003–2019	26 Mar 2019	128	Disc.: NEAT	MPC · JPL
0	2003 FY6	ATE	22.4	120 m	multiple	2003–2018	16 Apr 2018	184	Disc.: LONEOS	MPC · JPL
5	2003 FJ8	APO	26.7	16 m	single	5 days	04 Apr 2003	44	Disc.: LINEAR	MPC · JPL
0	2003 FE21	MBA-M	17.9	1.1 km	multiple	2003–2020	23 Jan 2020	50	Disc.: LPL/Spacewatch II; Alt.: 2016 DE15	MPC · JPL
1	2003 FN29	MBA-O	17.3	1.9 km	multiple	2003–2019	29 Apr 2019	48	Disc.: NEAT	MPC · JPL
1	2003 FM33	MBA-I	18.8	520 m	multiple	2003–2021	15 Apr 2021	37	Disc.: Spacewatch; Added on 11 May 2021; Alt.: 2021 EC6	MPC · JPL
0	2003 FS81	MBA-O	17.3	1.9 km	multiple	2003–2014	19 May 2014	50	Disc.: Spacewatch; Alt.: 2014 DF109	MPC · JPL
1	2003 FM87	MBA-I	18.4	620 m	multiple	2001–2017	20 Apr 2017	60	Disc.: LPL/Spacewatch II; Alt.: 2010 CU40	MPC · JPL
0	2003 FZ116	MBA-I	18.37	630 m	multiple	2003–2021	01 Apr 2021	90	Disc.: Spacewatch	MPC · JPL
–	2003 FD122	MBA-O	17.8	1.5 km	single	2 days	02 Apr 2003	10	Disc.: Cerro Tololo	MPC · JPL
2	2003 FH122	MBA-M	17.8	1.2 km	multiple	2003–2016	30 Mar 2016	38	Disc.: Cerro Tololo	MPC · JPL
0	2003 FQ122	MBA-O	17.2	2.0 km	multiple	1997–2020	15 Oct 2020	74	Disc.: Mauna Kea Obs. Alt.: 1997 AZ22, 2015 VF11	MPC · JPL
0	2003 FZ124	MBA-I	19.1	450 m	multiple	2003–2021	18 Jan 2021	30	Disc.: Kitt Peak Obs. Added on 22 July 2020	MPC · JPL
1	2003 FD125	MBA-I	19.3	410 m	multiple	2003–2019	19 Dec 2019	31	Disc.: Kitt Peak Obs. Added on 21 August 2021; Alt.: 2005 WX197	MPC · JPL
0	2003 FL125	MBA-M	18.75	530 m	multiple	2003–2021	10 Sep 2021	50	Disc.: Kitt Peak Obs.	MPC · JPL
4	2003 FH127	TNO	7.39	125 km	multiple	2003-2016	04 Jun 2016	34	Disc.: Kitt Peak Obs. LoUTNOs, cubewano (cold)	MPC · JPL
4	2003 FJ127	TNO	7.5	132 km	multiple	2002–2004	22 Feb 2004	18	Disc.: Kitt Peak Obs. LoUTNOs, other TNO	MPC · JPL
4	2003 FL127	TNO	6.30	260 km	multiple	2001–2021	20 Mar 2021	23	Disc.: Kitt Peak Obs. LoUTNOs, plutino	MPC · JPL
3	2003 FM127	TNO	7.1	126 km	multiple	2003–2016	29 May 2016	15	Disc.: Kitt Peak Obs. LoUTNOs, cubewano (cold)	MPC · JPL
4	2003 FD128	TNO	7.3	178 km	multiple	2002–2013	14 Mar 2013	18	Disc.: Kitt Peak Obs. LoUTNOs, cubewano (hot)	MPC · JPL
2	2003 FH129	TNO	8.3	122 km	multiple	2003–2015	16 Mar 2015	17	Disc.: Kitt Peak Obs. LoUTNOs, centaur	MPC · JPL
0	2003 FL129	MBA-M	17.9	1.1 km	multiple	2001–2020	24 Mar 2020	45	Disc.: La Silla Obs.	MPC · JPL
4	2003 FZ129	TNO	7.4	125 km	multiple	1999–2016	17 May 2016	26	Disc.: Mauna Kea Obs. LoUTNOs, SDO, BR-mag: 1.32; taxonomy: BR	MPC · JPL
2	2003 FA130	TNO	7.2	121 km	multiple	2000–2013	14 May 2013	21	Disc.: Mauna Kea Obs. LoUTNOs, cubewano (cold)	MPC · JPL
E	2003 FB130	TNO	7.5	132 km	single	3 days	27 Mar 2003	4	Disc.: Mauna Kea Obs. LoUTNOs, other TNO	MPC · JPL
–	2003 FD134	MCA	15.7	4.0 km	single	6 days	05 Apr 2003	7	Disc.: Drebach Obs.	MPC · JPL
1	2003 FP136	MBA-M	18.36	890 m	multiple	2003–2021	31 Aug 2021	62	Disc.: Kitt Peak Obs.	MPC · JPL
1	2003 FQ136	MBA-I	18.7	540 m	multiple	2003–2017	16 Apr 2017	41	Disc.: Spacewatch	MPC · JPL
0	2003 FJ137	MBA-I	18.0	750 m	multiple	2003–2019	03 Dec 2019	45	Disc.: Kitt Peak Obs.	MPC · JPL
0	2003 FL137	MBA-I	18.43	610 m	multiple	2003–2022	27 Jan 2022	37	Disc.: SDSS	MPC · JPL
0	2003 FN137	MBA-M	17.9	1.5 km	multiple	2003–2017	27 May 2017	31	Disc.: SDSS	MPC · JPL
0	2003 FB139	MBA-I	18.8	520 m	multiple	2003–2020	13 Sep 2020	52	Disc.: SDSS	MPC · JPL
0	2003 FH139	MBA-I	17.9	780 m	multiple	2003–2019	27 Oct 2019	35	Disc.: Spacewatch	MPC · JPL
0	2003 FL140	MBA-O	17.1	2.1 km	multiple	2003–2020	23 Jun 2020	61	Disc.: SDSS	MPC · JPL
0	2003 FQ140	MBA-I	18.9	490 m	multiple	2003–2019	28 Oct 2019	49	Disc.: Kitt Peak Obs.	MPC · JPL
0	2003 FR140	MBA-M	18.3	1.2 km	multiple	2003–2019	20 Dec 2019	35	Disc.: Kitt Peak Obs.	MPC · JPL
0	2003 FY140	MBA-M	18.2	960 m	multiple	2003–2020	27 Jan 2020	39	Disc.: SDSS	MPC · JPL
0	2003 FC141	MBA-O	17.71	1.6 km	multiple	2003–2021	02 Oct 2021	90	Disc.: Kitt Peak Obs.	MPC · JPL
0	2003 FD141	MBA-M	18.6	570 m	multiple	1999–2015	10 Jan 2015	33	Disc.: Spacewatch; Added on 22 July 2020	MPC · JPL
0	2003 FO141	MBA-I	18.6	570 m	multiple	2003–2020	14 Dec 2020	23	Disc.: Spacewatch; Added on 19 October 2020	MPC · JPL
0	2003 FT141	MBA-I	18.28	660 m	multiple	2003–2021	08 May 2021	110	Disc.: Spacewatch; Added on 17 January 2021	MPC · JPL
0	2003 FX141	MBA-O	17.29	1.9 km	multiple	2003–2021	10 Aug 2021	37	Disc.: Spacewatch; Added on 21 August 2021	MPC · JPL

back to top

== G ==
U	Designation	Class	Physical		Observations				Description and notes	Ref
U	Designation	Class	H	D	Opp.	Arc	Last	Used	Description and notes	Ref
6	2003 GD	APO	22.1	140 m	single	20 days	22 Apr 2003	82	Disc.: LONEOS; AMO at MPC	MPC · JPL
2	2003 GJ	MCA	19.5	530 m	multiple	2003–2016	01 Apr 2016	82	Disc.: LONEOS	MPC · JPL
0	2003 GX	AMO	23.95	54 m	multiple	2003-2026	23 Mar 2026	69	Disc.: LONEOS	MPC · JPL
2	2003 GS18	MBA-M	18.7	760 m	multiple	2003–2020	25 May 2020	17	Disc.: Spacewatch; Added on 9 March 2021	MPC · JPL
5	2003 GO19	MBA-M	17.8	820 m	multiple	2003–2009	21 Nov 2009	14	Disc.: Spacewatch; Alt.: 2009 WZ50	MPC · JPL
8	2003 GF21	APO	22.2	130 m	single	3 days	10 Apr 2003	39	Disc.: LONEOS	MPC · JPL
0	2003 GG21	APO	21.97	140 m	multiple	2003–2021	11 Oct 2021	176	Disc.: NEAT; Potentially hazardous object	MPC · JPL
0	2003 GH21	AMO	21.59	170 m	multiple	2003–2021	31 May 2021	130	Disc.: LINEAR	MPC · JPL
4	2003 GJ21	AMO	22.9	93 m	single	93 days	03 Jul 2003	69	Disc.: Spacewatch	MPC · JPL
0	2003 GM21	MBA-M	17.7	1.2 km	multiple	2003–2020	29 May 2020	220	Disc.: NEAT	MPC · JPL
0	2003 GQ22	ATE	21.48	180 m	multiple	2003–2016	02 May 2016	80	Disc.: LINEAR; Potentially hazardous object	MPC · JPL
0	2003 GR22	APO	22.0	140 m	multiple	2003–2020	19 Nov 2020	71	Disc.: LINEAR; Potentially hazardous object	MPC · JPL
0	2003 GS22	AMO	22.5	110 m	multiple	2003–2021	13 Apr 2021	113	Disc.: Spacewatch; Alt.: 2021 AD2	MPC · JPL
0	2003 GO24	MBA-I	18.9	490 m	multiple	2003–2020	23 Sep 2020	50	Disc.: Spacewatch	MPC · JPL
0	2003 GR31	MBA-I	18.5	590 m	multiple	2003–2018	14 Jun 2018	21	Disc.: LPL/Spacewatch II; Added on 19 October 2020	MPC · JPL
1	2003 GB34	APO	18.8	620 m	multiple	2002–2006	19 Aug 2006	77	Disc.: LINEAR	MPC · JPL
1	2003 GU41	APO	18.6	680 m	multiple	2003–2006	07 Jan 2006	40	Disc.: LONEOS	MPC · JPL
6	2003 GD42	APO	24.7	41 m	single	6 days	15 Apr 2003	28	Disc.: LINEAR	MPC · JPL
7	2003 GP51	APO	22.0	140 m	single	21 days	05 May 2003	52	Disc.: LONEOS; Potentially hazardous object	MPC · JPL
E	2003 GM53	TNO	6.9	143 km	single	30 days	01 May 2003	5	Disc.: Kitt Peak Obs. LoUTNOs, cubewano?	MPC · JPL
0	2003 GB54	MBA-O	17.25	2.3 km	multiple	2003-2025	28 Mar 2025	43	Disc.: Cerro Tololo	MPC · JPL
4	2003 GF55	TNO	6.6	246 km	multiple	2003–2013	13 Mar 2013	15	Disc.: Kitt Peak Obs. LoUTNOs, cubewano (hot)	MPC · JPL
0	2003 GJ58	MBA-M	17.26	2.0 km	multiple	2003–2021	10 May 2021	105	Disc.: Spacewatch	MPC · JPL
0	2003 GF61	MBA-M	17.5	1.8 km	multiple	2003–2019	23 Oct 2019	40	Disc.: LPL/Spacewatch II	MPC · JPL
0	2003 GH61	MBA-I	18.5	590 m	multiple	1994–2020	23 Nov 2020	39	Disc.: Kitt Peak Obs.	MPC · JPL
1	2003 GO61	MBA-M	18.32	1.2 km	multiple	2003–2021	29 Apr 2021	47	Disc.: Spacewatch	MPC · JPL
1	2003 GP61	MBA-I	19.01	470 m	multiple	2003–2021	13 Apr 2021	24	Disc.: NEAT	MPC · JPL
0	2003 GM62	MBA-M	17.4	1.4 km	multiple	2003–2020	21 May 2020	55	Disc.: SDSS	MPC · JPL
0	2003 GF63	MBA-I	18.6	570 m	multiple	2003–2019	11 May 2019	41	Disc.: SDSS	MPC · JPL
1	2003 GH65	MBA-I	18.4	620 m	multiple	2003–2019	03 Dec 2019	49	Disc.: Kitt Peak Obs.	MPC · JPL
0	2003 GN65	MBA-M	17.9	1.5 km	multiple	2003–2019	05 Nov 2019	33	Disc.: Kitt Peak Obs.	MPC · JPL
0	2003 GV65	MBA-M	18.1	1.0 km	multiple	2003–2020	22 Mar 2020	32	Disc.: Kitt Peak Obs.	MPC · JPL
1	2003 GW65	MBA-M	18.28	660 m	multiple	2003–2021	11 Nov 2021	42	Disc.: Spacewatch	MPC · JPL
0	2003 GX65	MBA-I	18.3	650 m	multiple	2003–2019	26 Oct 2019	25	Disc.: SDSS	MPC · JPL
1	2003 GT66	MBA-M	18.23	1.3 km	multiple	2003–2021	31 Mar 2021	36	Disc.: SDSS; Added on 9 March 2021	MPC · JPL
0	2003 GF67	MBA-I	18.2	680 m	multiple	2003–2019	06 Oct 2019	26	Disc.: SDSS; Added on 29 January 2022	MPC · JPL

back to top
