= List of unnumbered minor planets: 2003 U (290–379) =

This is a partial list of unnumbered minor planets for principal provisional designations assigned during 16–31 October 2003. Since this period yielded a high number of provisional discoveries, it is further split into several standalone pages. As of November 2025, a total of 170 bodies remain unnumbered for this period. Objects for this year are listed on the following pages: A–E · F–G · H–L · M–R · S_{i} · S_{ii} · S_{iii} · S_{iv} · T · U_{i} · U_{ii} · U_{iii} · U_{iv} · V · W_{i} · W_{ii} and X–Y. Also see previous and next year.

Near-Earth obj.	MBA (inner)	MBA (outer)	Centaur
Mars-crosser	MBA (middle)	Jupiter trojan	Trans-Neptunian obj.
Unclassified

== U ==
U	Designation	Class	Physical		Observations				Description and notes	Ref
U	Designation	Class	H	D	Opp.	Arc	Last	Used	Description and notes	Ref
9	2003 US291	TNO	7.1	158 km	single	33 days	24 Nov 2003	6	LoUTNOs, other TNO	MPC · JPL
3	2003 UT291	TNO	6.4	174 km	multiple	2003–2013	07 Oct 2013	15	LoUTNOs, cubewano (cold)	MPC · JPL
4	2003 UV291	TNO	7.3	115 km	multiple	2003–2017	23 Sep 2017	42	LoUTNOs, cubewano (cold)	MPC · JPL
9	2003 UW291	TNO	6.3	189 km	single	28 days	20 Nov 2003	4	LoUTNOs, cubewano?	MPC · JPL
9	2003 UX291	TNO	7.0	137 km	single	28 days	20 Nov 2003	4	LoUTNOs, cubewano?	MPC · JPL
4	2003 UY291	TNO	7.21	120 km	multiple	2003–2021	11 Jan 2021	17	LoUTNOs, cubewano (cold), BR-mag: 1.39; taxonomy: BB	MPC · JPL
4	2003 UZ291	TNO	7.09	196 km	multiple	2003–2021	05 Nov 2021	23	LoUTNOs, cubewano (hot)	MPC · JPL
9	2003 UA292	TNO	6.1	207 km	single	29 days	20 Nov 2003	4	LoUTNOs, cubewano?	MPC · JPL
3	2003 UB292	TNO	5.88	277 km	multiple	2003–2021	03 Oct 2021	30	LoUTNOs, other TNO	MPC · JPL
9	2003 UC292	TNO	6.9	143 km	single	28 days	20 Nov 2003	4	LoUTNOs, cubewano?	MPC · JPL
9	2003 UD292	TNO	6.6	164 km	single	29 days	21 Nov 2003	4	LoUTNOs, cubewano?	MPC · JPL
9	2003 UE292	TNO	6.7	190 km	single	29 days	21 Nov 2003	4	LoUTNOs, other TNO	MPC · JPL
9	2003 UF292	TNO	7.3	144 km	single	28 days	20 Nov 2003	4	LoUTNOs, other TNO	MPC · JPL
–	2003 UG292	TNO	7.0	204 km	single	59 days	21 Dec 2003	7	LoUTNOs, cubewano (hot)	MPC · JPL
E	2003 UH292	TNO	7.7	99 km	single	27 days	20 Nov 2003	4	LoUTNOs, cubewano?	MPC · JPL
E	2003 UK292	TNO	7.2	125 km	single	28 days	21 Nov 2003	4	LoUTNOs, cubewano?	MPC · JPL
E	2003 UL292	TNO	7.3	119 km	single	28 days	21 Nov 2003	4	LoUTNOs, cubewano?	MPC · JPL
E	2003 UM292	TNO	7.0	166 km	single	28 days	21 Nov 2003	4	LoUTNOs, other TNO	MPC · JPL
4	2003 UN292	TNO	7.5	105 km	multiple	2003–2016	04 Feb 2016	16	LoUTNOs, cubewano (cold)	MPC · JPL
E	2003 UO292	TNO	7.4	157 km	single	30 days	21 Nov 2003	4	LoUTNOs, plutino?	MPC · JPL
E	2003 UQ292	TNO	7.0	188 km	single	32 days	24 Nov 2003	4	LoUTNOs, plutino?	MPC · JPL
9	2003 UU292	TNO	8.2	108 km	single	28 days	21 Nov 2003	4	LoUTNOs, plutino?	MPC · JPL
4	2003 UV292	TNO	7.39	157 km	multiple	2003–2021	01 Dec 2021	21	LoUTNOs, plutino	MPC · JPL
9	2003 UX292	TNO	6.6	164 km	single	28 days	20 Nov 2003	4	LoUTNOs, cubewano?	MPC · JPL
E	2003 UY292	CEN	10.2	51 km	single	29 days	21 Nov 2003	4	—	MPC · JPL
E	2003 UZ292	TNO	7.7	120 km	single	28 days	21 Nov 2003	4	LoUTNOs, other TNO	MPC · JPL
2	2003 UK293	TNO	7.4	110 km	multiple	2003–2017	16 Dec 2017	44	LoUTNOs, cubewano (cold)	MPC · JPL
0	2003 UU294	MBA-I	19.1	450 m	multiple	2003–2020	23 Nov 2020	26	—	MPC · JPL
0	2003 UV295	MBA-I	19.6	360 m	multiple	2003–2017	23 Sep 2017	19	—	MPC · JPL
0	2003 UX295	MBA-M	19.2	610 m	multiple	2003–2020	12 Dec 2020	56	Disc.: Spacewatch; Added on 17 January 2021	MPC · JPL
0	2003 UP296	MBA-O	17.15	2.1 km	multiple	2003–2021	30 Dec 2021	48	Disc.: Spacewatch; Added on 17 June 2021	MPC · JPL
2	2003 UG297	MBA-I	18.1	710 m	multiple	2003–2019	24 Nov 2019	44	—	MPC · JPL
1	2003 UV297	MBA-I	18.9	490 m	multiple	2003–2020	14 Dec 2020	24	Disc.: Spacewatch; Added on 17 June 2021	MPC · JPL
0	2003 UZ297	HIL	16.3	3.1 km	multiple	2003–2020	19 Jan 2020	74	—	MPC · JPL
0	2003 UJ298	MBA-I	19.16	440 m	multiple	2003–2021	30 Oct 2021	37	Disc.: Spacewatch; Added on 5 November 2021; Alt.: 2014 WB225	MPC · JPL
0	2003 UB299	MBA-I	19.33	400 m	multiple	2003–2022	07 Jan 2022	38	—	MPC · JPL
1	2003 UR301	MBA-M	18.76	990 m	multiple	2003–2021	29 Nov 2021	67	Disc.: Spacewatch; Added on 5 November 2021	MPC · JPL
0	2003 UF302	MBA-M	18.3	1.2 km	multiple	2003–2019	28 Feb 2019	35	—	MPC · JPL
1	2003 UW302	MBA-O	18.4	1.2 km	multiple	2003–2019	01 Nov 2019	22	Disc.: Spacewatch; Added on 17 June 2021; Alt.: 2019 QD66	MPC · JPL
1	2003 UD303	MBA-O	17.9	1.5 km	multiple	2003–2020	14 Nov 2020	42	Alt.: 2014 SW6	MPC · JPL
0	2003 UF304	MBA-M	18.1	710 m	multiple	2003–2007	09 Oct 2007	24	Alt.: 2007 TJ75	MPC · JPL
1	2003 UR304	MBA-M	18.28	1.2 km	multiple	2003–2021	09 Oct 2021	46	Disc.: Spacewatch; Added on 30 September 2021; Alt.: 2021 PH71	MPC · JPL
1	2003 UL305	MBA-M	19.0	670 m	multiple	2003–2020	10 Dec 2020	22	Disc.: Spacewatch; Added on 17 June 2021; Alt.: 2020 WH11	MPC · JPL
0	2003 UT305	HIL	16.2	3.2 km	multiple	2003–2021	06 Jan 2021	48	—	MPC · JPL
0	2003 UN306	MBA-M	18.3	650 m	multiple	2003–2019	29 Oct 2019	67	Alt.: 2015 TT21	MPC · JPL
0	2003 UQ306	MBA-O	18.0	1.4 km	multiple	2003–2020	09 Dec 2020	36	Alt.: 2014 SG45	MPC · JPL
1	2003 UK307	MBA-M	18.60	800 m	multiple	2003–2022	28 Jan 2022	27	Disc.: Spacewatch; Added on 29 January 2022	MPC · JPL
0	2003 UT308	MBA-I	18.76	530 m	multiple	2003–2018	17 Nov 2018	48	—	MPC · JPL
0	2003 UQ309 = (887251)	MBA-O	17.6	1.7 km	multiple	2003–2021	15 Jan 2021	43	—	MPC · JPL
0	2003 UB310	MBA-M	17.7	1.2 km	multiple	2003–2021	05 Jan 2021	92	Disc.: Spacewatch; Added on 17 January 2021	MPC · JPL
1	2003 UH315	MBA-M	18.78	410 m	multiple	2003-2024	26 Dec 2024	43	—	MPC · JPL
0	2003 UJ315	MBA-M	18.4	620 m	multiple	2003–2019	03 Jun 2019	42	—	MPC · JPL
2	2003 UB318	MBA-M	18.6	570 m	multiple	2003–2015	09 Sep 2015	24	—	MPC · JPL
0	2003 UN320	MBA-M	17.73	1.6 km	multiple	2003–2021	02 Oct 2021	30	Alt.: 2003 SC406	MPC · JPL
0	2003 UX321	MBA-M	18.0	1.1 km	multiple	2003–2020	15 Dec 2020	89	—	MPC · JPL
1	2003 UL322	MBA-M	18.0	1.4 km	multiple	2003–2017	16 Nov 2017	26	—	MPC · JPL
0	2003 UQ322	MBA-M	18.07	1.4 km	multiple	2003–2021	06 Nov 2021	46	Disc.: Spacewatch; Added on 30 September 2021	MPC · JPL
1	2003 US322	MBA-I	19.1	450 m	multiple	2003–2020	12 Sep 2020	39	Disc.: Spacewatch; Added on 17 June 2021; Alt.: 2010 VT141, 2010 VX265	MPC · JPL
0	2003 UM324	MBA-M	17.42	940 m	multiple	2003-2024	30 Dec 2024	43	—	MPC · JPL
3	2003 UY326	MBA-M	18.9	700 m	multiple	2003–2012	03 Nov 2012	20	Alt.: 2012 UR39	MPC · JPL
0	2003 UZ326	MBA-O	17.6	1.7 km	multiple	2003–2019	24 Dec 2019	41	—	MPC · JPL
–	2003 UJ327	MBA-O	18.4	1.2 km	single	6 days	23 Oct 2003	6	—	MPC · JPL
1	2003 UC328	MBA-M	18.2	680 m	multiple	2003–2020	18 Dec 2020	29	—	MPC · JPL
–	2003 UW328	MBA-M	19.1	450 m	single	7 days	24 Oct 2003	8	—	MPC · JPL
0	2003 UM329	MBA-M	17.9	780 m	multiple	2003–2015	28 Jul 2015	50	—	MPC · JPL
0	2003 US330	MBA-M	17.42	1.8 km	multiple	2003–2021	23 May 2021	45	—	MPC · JPL
0	2003 UY332	MBA-O	17.6	1.7 km	multiple	2003–2019	21 Oct 2019	38	Disc.: SDSS; Added on 22 July 2020	MPC · JPL
4	2003 UG333	MBA-O	17.6	1.7 km	single	36 days	23 Oct 2003	10	Disc.: SDSS; Added on 29 January 2022	MPC · JPL
0	2003 UR333	MBA-I	19.2	430 m	multiple	2003–2019	01 Jun 2019	34	Alt.: 2013 TR62	MPC · JPL
2	2003 UW333	MBA-M	18.5	840 m	multiple	2003–2016	06 Oct 2016	51	—	MPC · JPL
0	2003 UN334	MBA-I	19.0	470 m	multiple	2000–2019	29 Jul 2019	60	—	MPC · JPL
0	2003 UN335	MBA-I	19.1	450 m	multiple	2003–2019	24 Oct 2019	152	—	MPC · JPL
3	2003 UB336	MBA-M	18.9	700 m	multiple	2003–2016	01 Nov 2016	31	—	MPC · JPL
1	2003 UE336	MBA-O	17.8	1.5 km	multiple	2003–2020	16 Oct 2020	18	Disc.: SDSS; Added on 21 August 2021	MPC · JPL
0	2003 UH336	MBA-M	18.4	880 m	multiple	2003–2020	15 Oct 2020	35	—	MPC · JPL
1	2003 UN336	MBA-M	18.83	720 m	multiple	2003–2021	02 Dec 2021	28	—	MPC · JPL
0	2003 UR336	MBA-M	17.98	1.4 km	multiple	2003–2021	04 Oct 2021	35	Disc.: SDSS; Added on 30 September 2021; Alt.: 2021 QF37	MPC · JPL
1	2003 UT336	MBA-I	19.06	460 m	multiple	2003–2021	09 Jun 2021	48	Alt.: 2003 UK337	MPC · JPL
2	2003 UW336	MBA-M	18.2	960 m	multiple	2003–2016	10 Sep 2016	25	—	MPC · JPL
0	2003 UB337	MBA-O	17.80	1.5 km	multiple	2003–2019	02 Nov 2019	63	—	MPC · JPL
0	2003 UD337	MBA-M	18.43	1.1 km	multiple	2003–2021	31 Oct 2021	64	—	MPC · JPL
3	2003 UM337	MBA-I	19.8	330 m	multiple	2003–2020	12 Sep 2020	19	Disc.: Spacewatch; Added on 19 October 2020	MPC · JPL align=left | — || MPC · JPL
1	2003 UD338	MBA-I	19.57	360 m	multiple	2003–2021	01 Nov 2021	31	—	MPC · JPL
0	2003 UN338	MBA-I	18.6	570 m	multiple	2003–2018	13 Aug 2018	39	Alt.: 2007 VF129	MPC · JPL
1	2003 UU338	MBA-M	19.18	810 m	multiple	2003–2021	28 Oct 2021	35	—	MPC · JPL
–	2003 UY338	MBA-M	19.4	390 m	single	6 days	24 Oct 2003	7	—	MPC · JPL
2	2003 UD339	MBA-M	19.1	840 m	multiple	2003–2017	22 Nov 2017	26	Alt.: 2017 UO75	MPC · JPL
1	2003 UO339	MBA-M	19.4	390 m	multiple	2003–2019	01 Oct 2019	34	Disc.: Spacewatch; Added on 17 January 2021; Alt.: 2015 TT54	MPC · JPL
0	2003 US339	MBA-M	18.5	840 m	multiple	2003–2020	17 Nov 2020	28	Disc.: Spacewatch; Added on 9 March 2021	MPC · JPL
3	2003 UN340	MBA-O	17.7	1.6 km	multiple	2003–2019	28 Aug 2019	27	—	MPC · JPL
2	2003 UT340	MBA-O	17.4	1.8 km	multiple	2003–2020	12 Dec 2020	32	Disc.: Spacewatch; Added on 17 January 2021	MPC · JPL
0	2003 UT341	MBA-I	18.6	1.3 km	multiple	2003–2020	11 Oct 2020	73	—	MPC · JPL
2	2003 UO343	MBA-M	19.99	440 m	multiple	2003-2024	09 Nov 2024	23	—	MPC · JPL
0	2003 UY343	MBA-O	16.9	2.3 km	multiple	2003–2019	27 Oct 2019	73	Alt.: 2016 CK140	MPC · JPL
0	2003 UN344	HUN	19.63	350 m	multiple	2003–2021	09 Nov 2021	29	—	MPC · JPL
0	2003 UO344	MBA-M	18.48	1.1 km	multiple	2003–2021	27 Oct 2021	54	Disc.: SDSS; Added on 30 September 2021	MPC · JPL
0	2003 UP344	MBA-I	18.5	590 m	multiple	2003–2015	08 Dec 2015	25	—	MPC · JPL
0	2003 US344	MBA-I	18.8	520 m	multiple	2003–2018	17 Aug 2018	29	Alt.: 2007 WT21	MPC · JPL
0	2003 UK345	MBA-I	18.8	520 m	multiple	2003–2020	11 Oct 2020	56	—	MPC · JPL
0	2003 UL345	MBA-I	18.86	500 m	multiple	2003–2021	30 Nov 2021	54	Alt.: 2010 HP132	MPC · JPL
3	2003 UT345	MBA-I	19.3	410 m	multiple	2003–2014	25 Oct 2014	18	Disc.: SDSS; Added on 21 August 2021	MPC · JPL
0	2003 UA346	MBA-I	19.1	450 m	multiple	2003–2018	05 Oct 2018	32	—	MPC · JPL
0	2003 UC346	MBA-O	17.4	1.8 km	multiple	2003–2020	14 Dec 2020	29	Disc.: SDSS; Added on 17 June 2021; Alt.: 2019 RW55	MPC · JPL
3	2003 UK346	MBA-O	17.7	1.6 km	multiple	2003–2020	23 Oct 2020	21	Disc.: SDSS; Added on 21 August 2021	MPC · JPL
0	2003 UA347	MBA-I	19.4	390 m	multiple	2003–2020	10 Oct 2020	44	Disc.: SDSS; Added on 19 October 2020	MPC · JPL
1	2003 UP347	MBA-O	17.6	1.7 km	multiple	2003–2020	18 Dec 2020	25	Alt.: 2014 SD196	MPC · JPL
0	2003 UC348	HUN	19.66	350 m	multiple	2003–2021	10 May 2021	38	—	MPC · JPL
2	2003 UP348	MBA-M	18.4	620 m	multiple	2003–2021	16 Jan 2021	15	Disc.: SDSS; Added on 5 November 2021	MPC · JPL
0	2003 UT349 = (887252)	MBA-O	17.4	1.8 km	multiple	2003–2021	12 Feb 2021	36	Disc.: SDSS; Added on 11 May 2021; Alt.: 2014 WW450	MPC · JPL
3	2003 UG350	MBA-M	18.68	1.0 km	multiple	2003–2017	21 Nov 2017	17	Disc.: SDSS; Added on 17 June 2021	MPC · JPL
0	2003 UO350 = (887253)	HIL	16.2	3.2 km	multiple	1995–2019	25 Nov 2019	53	Alt.: 2011 UT19	MPC · JPL
1	2003 UM351	MBA-M	19.0	470 m	multiple	2003–2020	19 Dec 2020	14	—	MPC · JPL
0	2003 UN351	MBA-I	19.1	450 m	multiple	2003–2020	10 Dec 2020	62	—	MPC · JPL
0	2003 UM352	MBA-O	17.34	1.9 km	multiple	2001–2020	14 Oct 2020	50	Disc.: SDSS; Added on 17 January 2021; Alt.: 2010 BB147	MPC · JPL
0	2003 UP352	MBA-M	18.47	490 m	multiple	2003-2024	05 Dec 2024	52	—	MPC · JPL
0	2003 UF353	MBA-M	18.8	670 m	multiple	2003-2025	23 Sep 2025	31	—	MPC · JPL
0	2003 US353	MBA-I	19.4	390 m	multiple	2003–2020	06 Dec 2020	49	—	MPC · JPL
0	2003 UE354	MBA-I	18.94	450 m	multiple	2003-2023	16 Jan 2023	45	—	MPC · JPL
0	2003 UN354	MBA-M	18.97	430 m	multiple	2003-2024	04 Dec 2024	26	—	MPC · JPL
0	2003 UX354	MBA-I	18.96	480 m	multiple	2003–2021	29 Oct 2021	66	Alt.: 2014 WQ92	MPC · JPL
0	2003 UG355	MBA-M	18.12	1.3 km	multiple	2003–2021	10 Aug 2021	38	—	MPC · JPL
1	2003 UN356	MBA-I	19.3	410 m	multiple	2003–2021	07 Nov 2021	30	Disc.: Spacewatch; Added on 24 December 2021	MPC · JPL
0	2003 UR356	MBA-M	19.37	560 m	multiple	2003–2020	14 Dec 2020	72	Disc.: Spacewatch; Added on 17 January 2021	MPC · JPL
0	2003 UR357	MBA-M	19.3	580 m	multiple	2003–2020	10 Dec 2020	18	Disc.: Spacewatch; Added on 11 May 2021	MPC · JPL
0	2003 UA358	MBA-O	17.3	1.9 km	multiple	2003–2019	27 Oct 2019	42	—	MPC · JPL
1	2003 UZ358	MBA-M	18.2	960 m	multiple	2003–2020	14 Oct 2020	41	Disc.: Spacewatch; Added on 17 January 2021	MPC · JPL
0	2003 UU359	MBA-O	17.7	1.6 km	multiple	2003–2019	01 Nov 2019	29	Disc.: LPL/Spacewatch II; Added on 19 October 2020	MPC · JPL
–	2003 UL361	HIL	17.4	1.8 km	single	3 days	23 Oct 2003	7	—	MPC · JPL
0	2003 UM361	MBA-M	18.5	600 m	multiple	2003-2024	31 Oct 2024	35	—	MPC · JPL
0	2003 UP361	MBA-I	19.05	460 m	multiple	2003–2022	25 Jan 2022	36	—	MPC · JPL
1	2003 UT361	MBA-O	17.5	1.8 km	multiple	2003–2020	17 Dec 2020	26	—	MPC · JPL
–	2003 UZ361	MBA-I	20.2	270 m	single	3 days	23 Oct 2003	7	—	MPC · JPL
0	2003 UB362	MBA-M	18.1	1.0 km	multiple	2003–2020	11 Dec 2020	37	Disc.: Spacewatch; Added on 17 January 2021	MPC · JPL
1	2003 UJ362	MBA-M	17.8	1.2 km	multiple	2003–2020	14 Sep 2020	34	—	MPC · JPL
2	2003 UN362	MBA-M	18.1	1.3 km	multiple	2003–2017	14 Sep 2017	21	—	MPC · JPL
2	2003 UA363	MBA-M	18.5	590 m	multiple	2003–2019	09 Jul 2019	33	Alt.: 2015 MT113	MPC · JPL
1	2003 UM363	MBA-M	19.0	670 m	multiple	2003–2020	15 Sep 2020	26	—	MPC · JPL
0	2003 UF364	MBA-I	19.0	470 m	multiple	2003–2020	23 Aug 2020	70	—	MPC · JPL align=left | — || MPC · JPL
1	2003 UN364	MBA-I	19.2	430 m	multiple	2003–2020	13 Sep 2020	30	Disc.: Spacewatch; Added on 17 June 2021; Alt.: 2020 PM31	MPC · JPL
2	2003 UR364	MBA-I	19.09	450 m	multiple	2003–2021	29 Oct 2021	36	Alt.: 2021 SW26	MPC · JPL
0	2003 UZ365	MBA-M	18.4	880 m	multiple	2003–2020	19 Nov 2020	36	Alt.: 2007 RZ115	MPC · JPL
0	2003 UV366	MBA-I	19.4	390 m	multiple	2001–2003	15 Nov 2003	15	Alt.: 2001 FT239	MPC · JPL
0	2003 UN367	MBA-M	18.4	620 m	multiple	2003–2021	07 Feb 2021	19	Disc.: Spacewatch; Added on 5 November 2021	MPC · JPL
0	2003 UV367	MBA-M	18.2	960 m	multiple	2003–2020	17 Sep 2020	36	Disc.: Spacewatch; Added on 17 January 2021; Alt.: 2016 TL142	MPC · JPL
1	2003 UT369	MBA-I	19.08	450 m	multiple	2003–2017	10 Nov 2017	21	—	MPC · JPL
0	2003 UV369	MBA-M	17.8	1.2 km	multiple	2003–2020	10 Oct 2020	37	Disc.: LPL/Spacewatch II; Added on 17 January 2021	MPC · JPL
2	2003 UW369	MBA-O	18.52	1.0 km	multiple	2003-2023	08 Dec 2023	26	—	MPC · JPL
0	2003 UO370	MBA-I	19.2	430 m	multiple	2003–2020	16 Dec 2020	42	Disc.: Spacewatch; Added on 9 March 2021	MPC · JPL
0	2003 UZ370	MBA-M	17.8	1.2 km	multiple	2003–2020	16 Jun 2020	39	—	MPC · JPL
0	2003 UM371	MBA-M	17.4	1.8 km	multiple	2003–2017	09 Dec 2017	55	—	MPC · JPL
0	2003 UL372	MBA-O	17.4	1.8 km	multiple	2003–2019	03 Dec 2019	38	—	MPC · JPL
0	2003 UK373	MBA-O	18.2	1.3 km	multiple	2003–2017	19 May 2017	33	—	MPC · JPL
0	2003 UF374	MBA-M	18.6	570 m	multiple	2003–2021	16 Jan 2021	53	Disc.: SDSS; Added on 17 January 2021	MPC · JPL
0	2003 UG374	MBA-I	19.0	470 m	multiple	2003–2018	14 Sep 2018	35	Alt.: 2007 UB121	MPC · JPL
0	2003 UM375	MBA-I	19.0	470 m	multiple	2003–2020	17 Nov 2020	52	—	MPC · JPL
0	2003 UD376	MBA-I	18.7	540 m	multiple	2003–2019	27 May 2019	36	Alt.: 2009 HA35	MPC · JPL
0	2003 UH376	MBA-O	17.03	2.2 km	multiple	2003–2022	26 Jan 2022	24	Alt.: 2014 SD228	MPC · JPL
0	2003 UK376	MBA-I	19.3	410 m	multiple	2003–2016	26 Sep 2016	35	Alt.: 2016 QQ51	MPC · JPL
0	2003 UQ376	MBA-M	18.5	840 m	multiple	2003–2020	13 Aug 2020	27	Disc.: SDSS; Added on 22 July 2020	MPC · JPL
3	2003 UE378	MBA-I	18.9	490 m	multiple	2003–2014	25 Oct 2014	32	Alt.: 2014 SQ274	MPC · JPL
0	2003 UM378	MBA-I	18.4	620 m	multiple	2003–2020	21 Jun 2020	59	—	MPC · JPL
0	2003 UN378	HIL	16.7	2.5 km	multiple	2003–2020	23 Dec 2020	57	—	MPC · JPL
2	2003 UR378	MBA-O	18.3	1.2 km	multiple	2003–2020	14 Sep 2020	18	Disc.: SDSS; Added on 11 May 2021; Alt.: 2020 QK70	MPC · JPL
0	2003 UM379	MBA-O	18.1	1.3 km	multiple	2003–2019	28 Nov 2019	28	—	MPC · JPL

back to top
