= List of unnumbered minor planets: 2003 X–Y =

This is a partial list of unnumbered minor planets for principal provisional designations assigned during 1–31 December 2003. As of November 2025, a total of 105 bodies remain unnumbered for this period. Objects for this year are listed on the following pages: A–E · F–G · H–L · M–R · S_{i} · S_{ii} · S_{iii} · S_{iv} · T · U_{i} · U_{ii} · U_{iii} · U_{iv} · V · W_{i} · W_{ii} and X–Y. Also see previous and next year.

Near-Earth obj.	MBA (inner)	MBA (outer)	Centaur
Mars-crosser	MBA (middle)	Jupiter trojan	Trans-Neptunian obj.
Unclassified

== X ==
U	Designation	Class	Physical		Observations				Description and notes	Ref
U	Designation	Class	H	D	Opp.	Arc	Last	Used	Description and notes	Ref
0	2003 XH	MCA	18.4	1.2 km	multiple	2003–2018	11 Aug 2018	114	Disc.: LINEAR	MPC · JPL
8	2003 XK	APO	25.9	23 m	single	3 days	04 Dec 2003	16	Disc.: LINEAR	MPC · JPL
0	2003 XM	AMO	19.28	490 m	multiple	2003–2021	09 Jan 2021	149	Disc.: LINEAR	MPC · JPL
0	2003 XV	APO	26.7	16 m	multiple	2003–2011	06 Dec 2011	74	Disc.: Spacewatch	MPC · JPL
0	2003 XW	MCA	18.77	730 m	multiple	2003-2026	08 Feb 2026	176	Disc.: LINEAR	MPC · JPL
1	2003 XN1	MBA-O	17.4	1.8 km	multiple	2003–2021	06 Jan 2021	80	Disc.: Spacewatch; Alt.: 2014 SQ247	MPC · JPL
6	2003 XJ7	APO	26.4	19 m	single	1 day	06 Dec 2003	35	Disc.: LINEAR	MPC · JPL
6	2003 XH10	APO	25.5	28 m	single	4 days	08 Dec 2003	36	Disc.: LINEAR	MPC · JPL
6	2003 XZ12	APO	24.4	47 m	single	10 days	25 Dec 2003	30	Disc.: LINEAR	MPC · JPL
2	2003 XQ28	MBA-O	17.1	2.1 km	multiple	2003–2020	23 Nov 2020	44	Disc.: Spacewatch; Added on 17 January 2021	MPC · JPL
0	2003 XM34	MBA-I	18.8	520 m	multiple	2003–2020	14 Nov 2020	57	Disc.: LPL/Spacewatch II	MPC · JPL
1	2003 XX39	MBA-O	17.7	1.6 km	multiple	2003–2020	15 Oct 2020	61	Disc.: LINEAR; Added on 11 May 2021; Alt.: 2020 OE10	MPC · JPL
2	2003 XN43	HIL	15.6	4.2 km	multiple	2003–2021	09 Apr 2021	37	Disc.: LINEAR; Alt.: 2021 CW34	MPC · JPL
0	2003 XR43	MBA-O	17.2	2.0 km	multiple	2003–2020	22 Jan 2020	47	Disc.: Spacewatch	MPC · JPL
1	2003 XY43	MBA-O	17.3	1.9 km	multiple	2003–2019	03 Dec 2019	38	Disc.: Spacewatch	MPC · JPL
0	2003 XL45	MBA-I	17.99	750 m	multiple	2003–2021	06 Dec 2021	29	Disc.: Spacewatch	MPC · JPL
2	2003 XM45	MBA-M	19.1	640 m	multiple	2003–2020	12 Sep 2020	21	Disc.: Spacewatch	MPC · JPL
1	2003 XY45	MBA-I	19.1	450 m	multiple	2003–2020	20 Oct 2020	50	Disc.: Spacewatch	MPC · JPL
0	2003 XM46 = (887279)	MBA-O	17.84	1.5 km	multiple	2003–2021	15 Apr 2021	53	Disc.: LPL/Spacewatch II; Alt.: 2010 CE167	MPC · JPL
0	2003 XN46	MBA-O	17.2	2.0 km	multiple	2003–2019	29 Sep 2019	25	Disc.: Spacewatch	MPC · JPL
3	2003 XP46	MBA-I	18.9	490 m	multiple	2003–2020	08 Dec 2020	53	Disc.: Spacewatch; Added on 17 January 2021	MPC · JPL
0	2003 XQ46	MBA-M	18.32	1.2 km	multiple	1998–2021	07 Sep 2021	34	Disc.: Spacewatch; Added on 17 June 2021	MPC · JPL
0	2003 XV46	MBA-I	19.07	460 m	multiple	2003–2021	09 Dec 2021	46	Disc.: Spacewatch; Added on 24 December 2021	MPC · JPL

back to top

== Y ==
U	Designation	Class	Physical		Observations				Description and notes	Ref
U	Designation	Class	H	D	Opp.	Arc	Last	Used	Description and notes	Ref
0	2003 YM	MCA	16.7	1.9 km	multiple	2000–2021	14 Jan 2021	85	—	MPC · JPL
7	2003 YN1	APO	24.9	37 m	single	12 days	27 Dec 2003	23	AMO at MPC	MPC · JPL
5	2003 YP1	APO	21.8	160 m	single	56 days	30 Jan 2004	69	Potentially hazardous object	MPC · JPL
6	2003 YQ1	AMO	22.0	140 m	single	23 days	10 Jan 2004	54	—	MPC · JPL
3	2003 YR1	ATE	22.2	130 m	multiple	2003–2020	21 Dec 2020	58	—	MPC · JPL
6	2003 YS1	APO	19.6	430 m	single	27 days	13 Jan 2004	47	—	MPC · JPL
2	2003 YW1	AMO	22.2	130 m	multiple	2003–2019	07 Jan 2019	46	—	MPC · JPL
0	2003 YL2	MCA	18.05	1.4 km	multiple	2003–2021	03 Dec 2021	122	—	MPC · JPL
–	2003 YQ2	MBA-M	18.1	710 m	single	3 days	21 Dec 2003	17	—	MPC · JPL
0	2003 YP3	APO	20.22	320 m	multiple	2003–2021	10 Jul 2021	169	—	MPC · JPL
0	2003 YR4	MCA	17.9	780 m	multiple	2003–2021	14 Jan 2021	41	—	MPC · JPL
0	2003 YM7	MCA	19.2	430 m	multiple	2003–2020	22 Mar 2020	97	—	MPC · JPL
6	2003 YN7	APO	20.6	270 m	single	25 days	13 Jan 2004	74	—	MPC · JPL
0	2003 YG8	HUN	18.8	520 m	multiple	2003–2021	04 Dec 2021	39	Disc.: LINEAR; Added on 24 December 2021	MPC · JPL
2	2003 YS17	ATE	21.6	170 m	multiple	2003–2021	08 Jan 2021	204	Potentially hazardous object	MPC · JPL
0	2003 YH22	HUN	18.4	620 m	multiple	2003–2020	15 Feb 2020	38	—	MPC · JPL
6	2003 YD45	APO	21.0	220 m	single	30 days	19 Jan 2004	56	Potentially hazardous object	MPC · JPL
0	2003 YL49	MBA-M	17.53	1.7 km	multiple	2003–2022	05 Jan 2022	68	—	MPC · JPL
0	2003 YF67	MBA-M	17.99	1.4 km	multiple	2003–2021	08 Nov 2021	84	—	MPC · JPL
1	2003 YM67	MBA-M	18.2	680 m	multiple	2003–2020	24 Dec 2020	20	Disc.: Spacewatch; Added on 17 January 2021	MPC · JPL
0	2003 YT67	MBA-I	18.7	540 m	multiple	2003–2020	15 Oct 2020	40	Disc.: Spacewatch; Added on 17 January 2021	MPC · JPL
0	2003 YX67	MBA-I	18.7	540 m	multiple	2003–2021	18 Jan 2021	61	—	MPC · JPL
–	2003 YQ70	MCA	19.2	430 m	single	8 days	30 Dec 2003	28	—	MPC · JPL
5	2003 YS70	APO	29.1	5 m	single	5 days	27 Dec 2003	70	—	MPC · JPL
7	2003 YT70	AMO	25.8	25 m	single	22 days	13 Jan 2004	24	—	MPC · JPL
1	2003 YA74	MBA-O	17.2	2.0 km	multiple	2003–2018	13 Dec 2018	26	—	MPC · JPL
0	2003 YN93	MBA-M	17.72	1.6 km	multiple	2003–2022	08 Jan 2022	32	—	MPC · JPL
7	2003 YP94	APO	23.8	62 m	single	11 days	02 Jan 2004	38	AMO at MPC	MPC · JPL
2	2003 YN107	ATE	26.5	18 m	multiple	2003–2005	31 Mar 2005	45	—	MPC · JPL
6	2003 YH111	APO	24.5	45 m	single	2 days	29 Dec 2003	115	—	MPC · JPL
1	2003 YJ117	MCA	18.98	680 m	multiple	2003-2022	24 Dec 2022	51	—	MPC · JPL
7	2003 YR117	APO	22.9	93 m	single	15 days	12 Jan 2004	45	—	MPC · JPL
2	2003 YL118	APO	21.83	150 m	multiple	2003–2022	03 Jan 2022	110	Potentially hazardous object	MPC · JPL
0	2003 YK132	MCA	19.5	370 m	multiple	2003–2021	11 Mar 2021	71	Disc.: LINEAR; Added on 11 May 2021; Alt.: 2013 TA213	MPC · JPL
7	2003 YG136	ATE	25.3	31 m	single	4 days	01 Jan 2004	21	—	MPC · JPL
1	2003 YH136	APO	19.14	520 m	multiple	2003-2023	16 Nov 2023	80	Potentially hazardous object	MPC · JPL
1	2003 YJ136	AMO	20.55	250 m	multiple	2003-2025	23 Dec 2025	40	—	MPC · JPL
0	2003 YA152	MCA	19.3	410 m	multiple	2003–2019	09 Feb 2019	79	Alt.: 2018 VN4	MPC · JPL
0	2003 YH153	MCA	18.6	570 m	multiple	2003–2017	11 Oct 2017	84	—	MPC · JPL
2	2003 YA164	MBA-O	17.1	2.1 km	multiple	2003–2020	17 Dec 2020	51	Disc.: Spacewatch; Added on 17 January 2021	MPC · JPL
0	2003 YV173	MBA-O	17.53	1.7 km	multiple	2003–2021	09 Apr 2021	53	Alt.: 2010 KC77	MPC · JPL
0	2003 YG176	MBA-I	19.5	370 m	multiple	2003–2021	12 Aug 2021	33	Disc.: Mauna Kea Obs. Added on 21 August 2021; Alt.: 2014 WQ14	MPC · JPL
0	2003 YH176	MBA-O	17.3	1.9 km	multiple	2003–2021	04 Jan 2021	43	Alt.: 2005 GJ195, 2010 AA18	MPC · JPL
0	2003 YK177	MBA-M	17.9	1.5 km	multiple	2003–2021	07 Nov 2021	26	Disc.: Mauna Kea Obs. Added on 29 January 2022	MPC · JPL
2	2003 YJ179	TNO	7.1	126 km	multiple	2003–2019	08 Feb 2019	28	LoUTNOs, cubewano (cold)	MPC · JPL
5	2003 YK179	TNO	7.5	132 km	multiple	2003–2012	14 Nov 2012	19	LoUTNOs, other TNO	MPC · JPL
3	2003 YM179	TNO	8.0	105 km	multiple	2003–2020	18 Feb 2020	12	LoUTNOs, other TNO	MPC · JPL
5	2003 YN179	TNO	6.8	145 km	multiple	2002–2013	06 Nov 2013	19	LoUTNOs, cubewano (cold)	MPC · JPL
4	2003 YP179	TNO	7.35	113 km	multiple	2003–2021	11 Jan 2021	22	LoUTNOs, cubewano (cold)	MPC · JPL
4	2003 YR179	TNO	7.1	195 km	multiple	2003–2019	08 Feb 2019	16	LoUTNOs, cubewano (hot)	MPC · JPL
4	2003 YS179	TNO	6.8	109 km	multiple	2003–2020	04 Jan 2020	23	LoUTNOs, cubewano (cold), binary: 95 km	MPC · JPL
4	2003 YT179	TNO	7.1	126 km	multiple	2003–2020	18 Feb 2020	19	LoUTNOs, cubewano (cold)	MPC · JPL
3	2003 YU179	TNO	6.92	137 km	multiple	2003–2021	20 Mar 2021	36	LoUTNOs, cubewano (cold), binary: 88 km	MPC · JPL
5	2003 YV179	TNO	6.99	166 km	multiple	2003–2021	11 Jan 2021	21	LoUTNOs, other TNO	MPC · JPL
4	2003 YX179	TNO	7.0	132 km	multiple	2003–2020	04 Jan 2020	20	LoUTNOs, cubewano (cold)	MPC · JPL
E	2003 YY179	TNO	9.1	72 km	single	74 days	16 Dec 2003	6	LoUTNOs, plutino?	MPC · JPL
E	2003 YZ179	TNO	7.6	104 km	single	113 days	15 Apr 2004	5	LoUTNOs, cubewano?	MPC · JPL
0	2003 YA183	MBA-O	16.38	2.9 km	multiple	2003–2021	20 May 2021	139	—	MPC · JPL
1	2003 YU184	MBA-I	18.8	520 m	multiple	2003–2017	13 Nov 2017	56	—	MPC · JPL
0	2003 YY185	MBA-I	19.25	420 m	multiple	2003–2022	25 Jan 2022	51	—	MPC · JPL
0	2003 YD186	MBA-I	18.70	540 m	multiple	2003–2021	08 Dec 2021	59	—	MPC · JPL
0	2003 YP186 = (887281)	HUN	18.3	650 m	multiple	2003–2019	04 Nov 2019	55	—	MPC · JPL
0	2003 YQ186	MBA-M	17.7	1.2 km	multiple	2003–2016	10 Nov 2016	23	—	MPC · JPL
0	2003 YC188 = (887282)	MBA-I	18.31	650 m	multiple	2003–2021	07 Nov 2021	64	—	MPC · JPL
0	2003 YD188	MCA	19.3	410 m	multiple	2003–2019	03 Jan 2019	31	—	MPC · JPL
0	2003 YF188	HUN	18.6	570 m	multiple	2003–2020	22 Jan 2020	53	—	MPC · JPL
0	2003 YH188	MBA-I	18.86	500 m	multiple	2003–2021	04 Oct 2021	33	—	MPC · JPL
0	2003 YK188	MBA-I	18.63	560 m	multiple	2003–2021	08 Nov 2021	55	—	MPC · JPL
1	2003 YL188	MBA-O	17.6	1.7 km	multiple	2003–2019	05 Feb 2019	27	—	MPC · JPL
0	2003 YN189	MBA-I	19.1	450 m	multiple	2003–2019	01 Nov 2019	66	—	MPC · JPL
0	2003 YO189	HIL	15.9	3.7 km	multiple	2003–2020	21 Jan 2020	58	—	MPC · JPL
0	2003 YY189	MBA-O	17.1	2.1 km	multiple	2003–2017	18 May 2017	28	—	MPC · JPL
2	2003 YZ189	MBA-M	18.4	620 m	multiple	2003–2019	05 Nov 2019	30	—	MPC · JPL
0	2003 YB190 = (887283)	MBA-O	17.3	1.9 km	multiple	2003–2020	23 Jan 2020	28	Disc.: Spacewatch; Added on 22 July 2020	MPC · JPL
0	2003 YJ190	MBA-M	18.2	960 m	multiple	2003–2020	13 Oct 2020	29	Disc.: MLS; Added on 17 January 2021	MPC · JPL
0	2003 YU190	MBA-O	17.6	1.7 km	multiple	2003–2019	08 Oct 2019	27	Disc.: Pan-STARRS; Added on 30 September 2021	MPC · JPL
0	2003 YV190	MBA-O	17.2	2.0 km	multiple	2003–2019	04 Dec 2019	25	Disc.: MLS; Added on 30 September 2021	MPC · JPL
0	2003 YX190	MBA-M	18.22	1.3 km	multiple	2003–2021	13 Sep 2021	33	Disc.: Pan-STARRS; Added on 30 September 2021	MPC · JPL
1	2003 YY190	MBA-M	18.2	1.3 km	multiple	2003–2021	15 Sep 2021	19	Disc.: NEAT; Added on 5 November 2021	MPC · JPL
0	2003 YA191	HUN	19.28	410 m	multiple	2003–2022	12 Jan 2022	45	Disc.: Spacewatch; Added on 24 December 2021	MPC · JPL
0	2003 YB191	MBA-I	19.28	410 m	multiple	2003–2021	04 Oct 2021	35	Disc.: Pan-STARRS; Added on 24 December 2021	MPC · JPL
0	2003 YC191	HUN	19.41	390 m	multiple	2003–2022	25 Jan 2022	33	Disc.: No observations Added on 29 January 2022	MPC · JPL

back to top
