= List of unnumbered trans-Neptunian objects: 2003 =

The following is a partial list of unnumbered trans-Neptunian objects for principal designations assigned within 2003. As of October 2026, it contains a total of 114 bodies. For more information see the description on the main page. Also see list for the previous and next year.

== 2003 ==
Designation	First Observed (discovered)		D (km)	Orbital description						Remarks	Refs
Designation	Date	Observer (Site)	D (km)	Class	a (AU)	e	i (°)	q (AU)	Q (AU)	Remarks	Refs
2003 BF_{91}	27 January 2003	Hubble Space Telescope (250)	16	cubewano (cold)?	42.7	0.01	2	42.1	43.4	albedo: 0.152	MPC · JPL
2003 BG_{91}	27 January 2003	Hubble Space Telescope (250)	25	cubewano (cold)?	43.4	0.10	3	39.1	47.8	albedo: 0.152	MPC · JPL
2003 BH_{91}	27 January 2003	Hubble Space Telescope (250)	14	cubewano (cold)?	44.0	0.03	2	42.6	45.4	albedo: 0.152	MPC · JPL
2003 FA_{130}	24 March 2003	Maunakea (568)	124	cubewano (cold)	42.5	0.03	0	41.3	43.8	albedo: 0.152	MPC · JPL
2003 FB_{130}	24 March 2003	Maunakea (568)	150	cubewano (hot)?	43.0	0.11	24	38.2	47.8	albedo: 0.079	MPC · JPL
2003 FD_{128}	31 March 2003	M. W. Buie (695)	103	other TNO	38.3	0.03	5	37.3	39.3	albedo: 0.13	MPC · JPL
2003 FH_{127}	30 March 2003	M. W. Buie (695)	113	cubewano (cold)?	44.1	0.07	1	40.8	47.3	albedo: 0.152	MPC · JPL
2003 FH_{129}	30 March 2003	M. W. Buie (695)	121	centaur	71.2	0.61	19	27.6	114.8	albedo: 0.058	MPC · JPL
2003 FJ_{127}	30 March 2003	M. W. Buie (695)	130	other TNO	43.3	0.18	23	35.4	51.1	albedo: 0.13	MPC · JPL
2003 FL_{127}	31 March 2003	M. W. Buie (695)	248	plutino	39.3	0.23	4	30.1	48.5	albedo: 0.074	MPC · JPL
2003 FM_{127}	31 March 2003	M. W. Buie (695)	130	cubewano (cold)	43.6	0.06	4	40.9	46.4	albedo: 0.152	MPC · JPL
2003 FZ_{129}	24 March 2003	Maunakea (568)	126	SDO	61.7	0.39	6	38.0	85.5	albedo: 0.124; BRmag: 1.32; taxonomy: BR	MPC · JPL
2003 GF_{55}	1 April 2003	M. W. Buie (695)	215	cubewano (hot)	45.4	0.06	6	42.9	48.0	albedo: 0.079	MPC · JPL
2003 GM_{53}	1 April 2003	Kitt Peak (695)	197	cubewano (hot)?	44.5	0.05	7	42.2	46.7	albedo: 0.079	MPC · JPL
2003 HA_{57}	26 April 2003	Maunakea (568)	111	plutino	39.3	0.17	28	32.6	46.0	albedo: 0.074	MPC · JPL
2003 HF_{57}	26 April 2003	Maunakea (568)	83	plutino	39.2	0.19	1	31.7	46.8	albedo: 0.074	MPC · JPL
2003 HH_{57}	26 April 2003	Maunakea (568)	112	cubewano (cold)	43.9	0.09	1	40.1	47.7	albedo: 0.152	MPC · JPL
2003 HJ_{57}	26 April 2003	Maunakea (568)	107	plutino?	39.7	0.25	22	29.8	49.6	albedo: 0.074	MPC · JPL
2003 HK_{57}	26 April 2003	Maunakea (568)	159	cubewano (hot)?	41.2	0.10	7	37.1	45.3	albedo: 0.079	MPC · JPL
2003 HL_{57}	26 April 2003	Maunakea (568)	256	SDO	54.9	0.10	6	49.4	60.4	albedo: 0.124	MPC · JPL
2003 HN_{57}	26 April 2003	Maunakea (568)	228	cubewano (cold)?	122.0	0.55	176	55.4	188.6	albedo: 0.152	MPC · JPL
2003 HO_{57}	26 April 2003	Maunakea (568)	86	cubewano (cold)	46.1	0.15	4	39.1	53.2	albedo: 0.152	MPC · JPL
2003 HP_{57}	26 April 2003	Maunakea (568)	183	other TNO	56.8	0.10	31	51.1	62.5	albedo: 0.13	MPC · JPL
2003 HX_{56}	26 April 2003	Maunakea (568)	180	cubewano (hot)?	47.2	0.23	30	36.5	57.9	albedo: 0.079; BRmag: 1.01	MPC · JPL
2003 HZ_{56}	26 April 2003	Maunakea (568)	107	cubewano (cold)	43.6	0.01	3	43.3	43.8	albedo: 0.152	MPC · JPL
2003 KO_{20}	30 May 2003	M. W. Buie (807)	163	cubewano (cold)	43.8	0.04	2	41.9	45.7	albedo: 0.152	MPC · JPL
2003 KP_{20}	30 May 2003	Cerro Tololo Observatory, La Serena (807)	124	cubewano (cold)?	44.8	0.12	2	39.5	50.2	albedo: 0.152	MPC · JPL
2003 LA_{7}	1 June 2003	M. W. Buie (807)	188	res · 1:4	75.5	0.52	6	35.9	115.1	albedo: 0.126	MPC · JPL
2003 LC_{7}	1 June 2003	Cerro Tololo Observatory, La Serena (807)	196	cubewano (cold)?	45.1	0.12	5	39.9	50.4	albedo: 0.152	MPC · JPL
2003 LD_{7}	1 June 2003	Cerro Tololo Observatory, La Serena (807)	142	cubewano (cold)?	42.9	0.04	2	41.1	44.7	albedo: 0.152	MPC · JPL
2003 LD_{9}	1 June 2003	M. W. Buie, K. J. Meech (807)	206	cubewano (hot)?	47.0	0.17	7	39.0	55.1	albedo: 0.079	MPC · JPL
2003 LE_{7}	1 June 2003	Cerro Tololo Observatory, La Serena (807)	148	plutino?	39.3	0.21	19	31.2	47.4	albedo: 0.074	MPC · JPL
2003 LF_{7}	1 June 2003	Cerro Tololo Observatory, La Serena (807)	97	other TNO	39.5	0.13	3	34.5	44.5	albedo: 0.13	MPC · JPL
2003 LZ_{6}	1 June 2003	Cerro Tololo Observatory, La Serena (807)	237	cubewano (hot)?	43.5	0.00	7	43.5	43.5	albedo: 0.079	MPC · JPL
2003 MM_{13}	25 June 2003	Maunakea (568)	200	other TNO	36.0	0.45	2	19.8	52.2	albedo: 0.13	MPC · JPL
2003 OS_{33}	31 July 2003	Maunakea (568)	119	SDO	68.8	0.52	21	33.3	104.4	albedo: 0.124	MPC · JPL
2003 QB_{112}	26 August 2003	M. W. Buie (807)	172	cubewano (hot)	44.2	0.11	11	39.4	49.0	albedo: 0.079	MPC · JPL
2003 QC_{91}	25 August 2003	Cerro Tololo Observatory, La Serena (807)	136	cubewano (cold)?	43.5	0.00	3	43.5	43.5	albedo: 0.152	MPC · JPL
2003 QD_{91}	23 August 2003	M. W. Buie (807)	125	cubewano (cold)	43.3	0.03	2	41.9	44.6	albedo: 0.152	MPC · JPL
2003 QE_{112}	26 August 2003	M. W. Buie (807)	174	cubewano (cold)	43.0	0.05	4	41.1	45.0	albedo: 0.152	MPC · JPL
2003 QE_{91}	23 August 2003	M. W. Buie (807)	117	cubewano (cold)	43.0	0.05	4	41.0	45.0	albedo: 0.152	MPC · JPL
2003 QF_{91}	23 August 2003	M. W. Buie (807)	113	cubewano (cold)	43.0	0.03	2	41.6	44.4	albedo: 0.152	MPC · JPL
2003 QG_{91}	24 August 2003	M. W. Buie (807)	114	cubewano (cold)	42.5	0.02	2	41.7	43.2	albedo: 0.152	MPC · JPL
2003 QJ_{91}	24 August 2003	M. W. Buie (807)	148	cubewano (cold)	44.2	0.04	3	42.3	46.1	albedo: 0.152	MPC · JPL
2003 QL_{91}	25 August 2003	M. W. Buie (807)	135	cubewano (cold)	43.0	0.01	2	42.6	43.5	albedo: 0.152	MPC · JPL
2003 QM_{112}	29 August 2003	S. S. Sheppard, D. C. Jewitt, J. Kleyna (568)	8	centaur	85.5	0.85	16	13.3	157.7	albedo: 0.058	MPC · JPL
2003 QM_{91}	25 August 2003	M. W. Buie (807)	176	cubewano (cold)	43.2	0.05	3	41.3	45.2	albedo: 0.152; taxonomy: IR	MPC · JPL
2003 QN_{91}	23 August 2003	M. W. Buie (807)	112	cubewano (cold)	42.6	0.11	4	38.0	47.1	albedo: 0.152	MPC · JPL
2003 QO_{112}	29 August 2003	Maunakea (568)	23	centaur	33.3	0.50	7	16.5	50.1	albedo: 0.058	MPC · JPL
2003 QP_{91}	23 August 2003	M. W. Buie (807)	116	res · 3:4	36.5	0.10	7	32.9	40.2	albedo: 0.126	MPC · JPL
2003 QS_{91}	25 August 2003	M. W. Buie (807)	111	cubewano (cold)	46.2	0.14	4	39.6	52.8	albedo: 0.152	MPC · JPL
2003 QT_{90}	23 August 2003	M. W. Buie (807)	149	cubewano (cold)	43.9	0.06	2	41.3	46.6	albedo: 0.152	MPC · JPL
2003 QU_{90}	23 August 2003	M. W. Buie (807)	124	cubewano (cold)	45.3	0.16	2	38.3	52.4	albedo: 0.152	MPC · JPL
2003 QU_{91}	25 August 2003	Cerro Tololo Observatory, La Serena (807)	157	cubewano (hot)?	43.6	0.14	26	37.6	49.7	albedo: 0.079	MPC · JPL
2003 QV_{91}	23 August 2003	M. W. Buie (807)	117	other TNO	46.0	0.50	33	23.2	68.9	albedo: 0.13	MPC · JPL
2003 QW_{91}	23 August 2003	Cerro Tololo Observatory, La Serena (807)	74	plutino?	39.5	0.27	5	28.7	50.2	albedo: 0.074	MPC · JPL
2003 QX_{90}	24 August 2003	M. W. Buie (807)	159	cubewano (cold)	43.7	0.02	3	42.6	44.8	albedo: 0.152	MPC · JPL
2003 QX_{91}	23 August 2003	M. W. Buie (807)	76	res · 4:7	43.7	0.25	28	32.8	54.7	albedo: 0.126	MPC · JPL
2003 QY_{113}	31 August 2003	Maunakea (568)	156	cubewano (cold)?	44.9	0.07	3	41.7	48.0	albedo: 0.152	MPC · JPL
2003 QY_{90}	24 August 2003	M. W. Buie (807)	81	cubewano (cold)	42.7	0.05	4	40.4	45.0	binary: 80 km; albedo: 0.31	MPC · JPL
2003 QY_{91}	23 August 2003	M. W. Buie (807)	131	SDO	38.8	0.10	39	34.8	42.8	albedo: 0.124	MPC · JPL
2003 QZ_{90}	24 August 2003	Cerro Tololo Observatory, La Serena (807)	216	cubewano (hot)?	43.6	0.00	6	43.6	43.6	albedo: 0.079	MPC · JPL
2003 SO_{317}	25 September 2003	Maunakea (568)	119	plutino	39.4	0.27	7	28.7	50.2	albedo: 0.074	MPC · JPL
2003 SS_{422}	28 September 2003	Cerro Tololo Observatory, La Serena (807)	137	SDO	192.9	0.79	17	39.6	346.1	albedo: 0.124	MPC · JPL
2003 TJ_{58}	3 October 2003	Maunakea (568)	65	cubewano (cold)	44.7	0.09	1	40.7	48.8	binary: 51 km; albedo: 0.285	MPC · JPL
2003 TK_{58}	3 October 2003	Maunakea (568)	143	cubewano (cold)	43.4	0.06	3	40.8	45.9	albedo: 0.152	MPC · JPL
2003 TL_{58}	3 October 2003	Maunakea (568)	188	cubewano (hot)	43.9	0.05	8	41.6	46.1	albedo: 0.079	MPC · JPL
2003 UA_{292}	22 October 2003	M. W. Buie (695)	384	SDO	86.5	0.20	166	69.2	103.7	albedo: 0.124	MPC · JPL
2003 UB_{292}	23 October 2003	M. W. Buie (695)	315	cubewano (hot)?	47.3	0.05	19	44.9	49.7	albedo: 0.079	MPC · JPL
2003 UC_{292}	23 October 2003	M. W. Buie (695)	140	cubewano (cold)?	45.9	0.11	4	41.0	50.8	albedo: 0.152	MPC · JPL
2003 UD_{292}	23 October 2003	M. W. Buie (695)	169	SDO	70.4	0.44	7	39.8	101.0	albedo: 0.124	MPC · JPL
2003 UE_{292}	23 October 2003	M. W. Buie (695)	288	cubewano (hot)?	41.2	0.10	19	37.0	45.5	albedo: 0.079	MPC · JPL
2003 UF_{292}	23 October 2003	M. W. Buie (695)	162	cubewano (hot)?	46.5	0.16	30	39.0	54.0	albedo: 0.079	MPC · JPL
2003 UG_{292}	23 October 2003	M. W. Buie (695)	188	cubewano (hot)	44.4	0.12	7	39.0	49.9	albedo: 0.079	MPC · JPL
2003 UH_{292}	24 October 2003	Kitt Peak (695)	136	cubewano (hot)?	43.9	0.07	7	41.0	46.9	albedo: 0.079	MPC · JPL
2003 UK_{292}	24 October 2003	Kitt Peak (695)	172	cubewano (hot)?	43.2	0.11	13	38.5	47.9	albedo: 0.079	MPC · JPL
2003 UK_{293}	23 October 2003	M. W. Buie (695)	113	cubewano (cold)	42.6	0.08	3	39.3	46.0	albedo: 0.152	MPC · JPL
2003 UL_{292}	24 October 2003	Kitt Peak (695)	118	cubewano (cold)?	44.9	0.08	4	41.5	48.3	albedo: 0.152	MPC · JPL
2003 UM_{292}	24 October 2003	Kitt Peak (695)	188	cubewano (hot)?	46.1	0.19	18	37.4	54.7	albedo: 0.079	MPC · JPL
2003 UN_{292}	24 October 2003	M. W. Buie (695)	111	cubewano (cold)	45.3	0.12	1	40.0	50.5	albedo: 0.152	MPC · JPL
2003 UO_{292}	22 October 2003	Kitt Peak (695)	162	plutino?	39.4	0.19	5	32.0	46.8	albedo: 0.074	MPC · JPL
2003 UQ_{292}	23 October 2003	Kitt Peak (695)	194	plutino?	39.5	0.12	3	34.6	44.4	albedo: 0.074	MPC · JPL
2003 US_{291}	22 October 2003	M. W. Buie (695)	186	cubewano (hot)?	41.6	0.10	25	37.6	45.7	albedo: 0.079	MPC · JPL
2003 UT_{291}	22 October 2003	M. W. Buie (695)	175	cubewano (cold)	43.0	0.06	2	40.6	45.4	albedo: 0.152	MPC · JPL
2003 UU_{291}	23 October 2003	M. W. Buie (695)	180	cubewano (cold)?	48.7	0.11	3	43.5	53.8	albedo: 0.152	MPC · JPL
2003 UU_{292}	24 October 2003	M. W. Buie (695)	85	other TNO	40.8	0.16	16	34.2	47.4	albedo: 0.13	MPC · JPL
2003 UV_{291}	23 October 2003	M. W. Buie (695)	109	cubewano (cold)	43.9	0.03	2	42.5	45.2	albedo: 0.152	MPC · JPL
2003 UV_{292}	24 October 2003	M. W. Buie (695)	163	plutino	39.6	0.22	11	31.1	48.1	albedo: 0.074	MPC · JPL
2003 UW_{291}	23 October 2003	M. W. Buie (695)	254	cubewano (hot)?	47.3	0.11	11	42.1	52.4	albedo: 0.079	MPC · JPL
2003 UX_{291}	23 October 2003	M. W. Buie (695)	185	cubewano (hot)?	51.5	0.10	10	46.1	56.8	albedo: 0.079	MPC · JPL
2003 UX_{292}	23 October 2003	M. W. Buie (695)	317	cubewano (hot)?	43.4	0.11	11	38.7	48.0	albedo: 0.079	MPC · JPL
2003 UY_{283}	18 October 2003	Spacewatch (291)	5	unusual	33.4	0.89	19	3.5	63.2	albedo: 0.051	MPC · JPL
2003 UY_{291}	24 October 2003	M. W. Buie (695)	123	cubewano (cold)	49.6	0.16	4	41.5	57.7	albedo: 0.152; BRmag: 1.39; taxonomy: BB	MPC · JPL
2003 UZ_{291}	22 October 2003	M. W. Buie (695)	181	cubewano (hot)	45.4	0.13	5	39.4	51.5	albedo: 0.079	MPC · JPL
2003 UZ_{292}	24 October 2003	Kitt Peak (695)	136	cubewano (hot)?	43.2	0.14	22	37.2	49.1	albedo: 0.079	MPC · JPL
2003 WA_{191}	23 November 2003	M. W. Buie (695)	110	plutino	39.6	0.24	5	30.2	49.1	albedo: 0.074	MPC · JPL
2003 WN_{193}	17 November 2003	Cerro Tololo Observatory, La Serena (807)	97	plutino	39.4	0.25	22	29.4	49.4	albedo: 0.074	MPC · JPL
2003 WO_{193}	29 November 2003	Cerro Tololo Observatory, La Serena (807)	108	plutino	39.6	0.24	7	30.0	49.3	albedo: 0.074	MPC · JPL
2003 WQ_{188}	20 November 2003	Kitt Peak (695)	312	cubewano (hot)?	46.3	0.00	6	46.3	46.3	albedo: 0.079	MPC · JPL
2003 WS_{184}	20 November 2003	Kitt Peak (695)	113	cubewano (cold)?	44.0	0.05	3	41.8	46.2	albedo: 0.152	MPC · JPL
2003 WV_{188}	20 November 2003	M. W. Buie (695)	184	cubewano (hot)?	43.6	0.10	9	39.2	47.9	albedo: 0.079	MPC · JPL
2003 WW_{188}	21 November 2003	M. W. Buie (695)	150	cubewano (hot)?	54.1	0.26	5	40.1	68.0	albedo: 0.079	MPC · JPL
2003 YJ_{179}	16 December 2003	Maunakea (568)	147	cubewano (cold)	44.0	0.09	1	40.2	47.7	albedo: 0.152	MPC · JPL
2003 YK_{179}	16 December 2003	Maunakea (568)	150	cubewano (hot)?	42.0	0.15	20	35.7	48.3	albedo: 0.079	MPC · JPL
2003 YM_{179}	16 December 2003	Maunakea (568)	119	cubewano (hot)?	41.2	0.06	23	38.9	43.5	albedo: 0.079	MPC · JPL
2003 YN_{179}	16 December 2003	Maunakea (568)	144	cubewano (cold)	44.6	0.00	3	44.5	44.7	albedo: 0.152	MPC · JPL
2003 YP_{179}	24 December 2003	Maunakea (568)	116	cubewano (cold)	44.3	0.08	1	40.6	48.0	albedo: 0.152	MPC · JPL
2003 YR_{179}	24 December 2003	Maunakea (568)	179	cubewano (hot)	43.7	0.06	10	41.1	46.2	albedo: 0.079	MPC · JPL
2003 YS_{179}	24 December 2003	Maunakea (568)	146	cubewano (cold)	43.8	0.03	4	42.7	44.9	binary: 96 km; albedo: 0.152	MPC · JPL
2003 YT_{179}	24 December 2003	Maunakea (568)	125	cubewano (cold)	43.8	0.02	2	42.8	44.7	albedo: 0.152	MPC · JPL
2003 YV_{179}	24 December 2003	Maunakea (568)	188	cubewano (hot)?	47.3	0.22	16	36.8	57.9	albedo: 0.079	MPC · JPL
2003 YX_{179}	24 December 2003	Maunakea (568)	123	cubewano (cold)	43.8	0.05	5	41.8	45.9	albedo: 0.152	MPC · JPL
2003 YY_{179}	16 December 2003	Maunakea (568)	74	plutino?	39.6	0.16	11	33.4	45.7	albedo: 0.074	MPC · JPL
2003 YZ_{179}	24 December 2003	Maunakea (568)	143	cubewano (hot)?	43.2	0.12	13	38.2	48.1	albedo: 0.079	MPC · JPL

back to top
