= List of unnumbered minor planets: 2003 V =

This is a partial list of unnumbered minor planets for principal provisional designations assigned during 1–15 November 2003. As of November 2025, a total of 13 bodies remain unnumbered for this period. Objects for this year are listed on the following pages: A–E · F–G · H–L · M–R · S_{i} · S_{ii} · S_{iii} · S_{iv} · T · U_{i} · U_{ii} · U_{iii} · U_{iv} · V · W_{i} · W_{ii} and X–Y. Also see previous and next year.

Near-Earth obj.	MBA (inner)	MBA (outer)	Centaur
Mars-crosser	MBA (middle)	Jupiter trojan	Trans-Neptunian obj.
Unclassified

== V ==
U	Designation	Class	Physical		Observations				Description and notes	Ref
U	Designation	Class	H	D	Opp.	Arc	Last	Used	Description and notes	Ref
0	2003 VJ	MCA	18.0	750 m	multiple	2003–2017	28 Dec 2017	77	Disc.: Piszkéstető Stn. Alt.: 2010 VD171, 2010 VZ176	MPC · JPL
0	2003 VE1	APO	19.3	490 m	multiple	2003–2020	24 Jan 2020	79	Disc.: LINEAR; Potentially hazardous object	MPC · JPL
0	2003 VO1	MCA	18.9	700 m	multiple	2003–2021	06 Jan 2021	182	Disc.: LINEAR; Alt.: 2020 PN2	MPC · JPL
0	2003 VP1	MBA-I	18.5	590 m	multiple	2003–2017	24 Nov 2017	36	Disc.: LINEAR	MPC · JPL
0	2003 VM2	MBA-I	17.9	780 m	multiple	2003–2017	20 Dec 2017	84	Disc.: NEAT; Alt.: 2010 PT7	MPC · JPL
1	2003 VF3	MBA-O	17.2	2.0 km	multiple	2003–2020	05 Dec 2020	35	Disc.: Spacewatch; Added on 17 January 2021	MPC · JPL
1	2003 VV7	HUN	18.4	620 m	multiple	2003–2020	25 Jan 2020	117	Disc.: NEAT	MPC · JPL
0	2003 VZ12	MBA-O	16.4	2.9 km	multiple	2003–2020	11 Dec 2020	54	Disc.: LPL/Spacewatch II	MPC · JPL
0	2003 VE13	MBA-I	18.1	710 m	multiple	2003–2018	14 Aug 2018	37	Disc.: Tenagra II Obs.	MPC · JPL
0	2003 VJ13	MBA-O	17.1	2.1 km	multiple	2003–2019	03 Jul 2019	28	Disc.: La Palma Obs.	MPC · JPL
1	2003 VN13	HIL	16.9	2.3 km	multiple	2003–2019	04 Dec 2019	29	Disc.: LPL/Spacewatch II	MPC · JPL
0	2003 VP13	MBA-M	18.1	1.0 km	multiple	2003–2020	15 Sep 2020	34	Disc.: Spacewatch; Added on 17 January 2021	MPC · JPL
2	2003 VS13	MBA-I	19.6	360 m	multiple	2003–2021	30 Oct 2021	29	Disc.: Spacewatch; Added on 5 November 2021	MPC · JPL

back to top
