= List of unnumbered minor planets: 2003 U (430–619) =

This is a partial list of unnumbered minor planets for principal provisional designations assigned during 16–31 October 2003. Since this period yielded a high number of provisional discoveries, it is further split into several standalone pages. As of November 2025, a total of 129 bodies remain unnumbered for this period. Objects for this year are listed on the following pages: A–E · F–G · H–L · M–R · S_{i} · S_{ii} · S_{iii} · S_{iv} · T · U_{i} · U_{ii} · U_{iii} · U_{iv} · V · W_{i} · W_{ii} and X–Y. Also see previous and next year.

Near-Earth obj.	MBA (inner)	MBA (outer)	Centaur
Mars-crosser	MBA (middle)	Jupiter trojan	Trans-Neptunian obj.
Unclassified

== U ==
U	Designation	Class	Physical		Observations				Description and notes	Ref
U	Designation	Class	H	D	Opp.	Arc	Last	Used	Description and notes	Ref
0	2003 UD430	MBA-I	18.8	520 m	multiple	2003–2018	07 Mar 2018	36	—	MPC · JPL
0	2003 UN430	MBA-M	18.1	710 m	multiple	2003–2019	10 Jun 2019	36	—	MPC · JPL
0	2003 UR430	MBA-M	17.72	1.6 km	multiple	2003–2021	08 Aug 2021	52	—	MPC · JPL
1	2003 UZ430	MBA-O	17.1	2.1 km	multiple	2003–2020	15 Oct 2020	33	—	MPC · JPL
0	2003 UB431	MBA-I	18.7	540 m	multiple	2003–2020	23 Sep 2020	51	—	MPC · JPL
0	2003 UC431	MBA-O	17.1	2.1 km	multiple	2003–2020	05 Dec 2020	71	—	MPC · JPL
0	2003 UD431	MBA-O	17.6	1.7 km	multiple	2003–2019	03 Dec 2019	35	—	MPC · JPL
0	2003 UK431	MBA-I	19.2	430 m	multiple	2003–2017	22 Oct 2017	29	—	MPC · JPL
1	2003 UM431	MBA-M	18.3	650 m	multiple	2003–2019	25 Jul 2019	32	Alt.: 2010 NV139	MPC · JPL
1	2003 UN431	HUN	19.3	410 m	multiple	2003–2020	14 Nov 2020	55	—	MPC · JPL
0	2003 UP431	MBA-I	19.6	360 m	multiple	2003–2021	04 Jan 2021	34	—	MPC · JPL
0	2003 UQ431	MBA-O	17.82	1.5 km	multiple	2003–2022	06 Jan 2022	33	—	MPC · JPL
1	2003 UR431	MBA-I	19.4	390 m	multiple	2003–2017	14 Nov 2017	21	—	MPC · JPL
0	2003 US431 = (887259)	MBA-M	18.5	840 m	multiple	2003–2020	11 Oct 2020	25	—	MPC · JPL
0	2003 UN433	HUN	19.18	430 m	multiple	2003–2021	20 Apr 2021	68	—	MPC · JPL
0	2003 UX433	MBA-I	19.1	450 m	multiple	2003–2019	24 Jul 2019	52	—	MPC · JPL
1	2003 UO434	MBA-M	18.3	650 m	multiple	2003–2019	01 Jun 2019	49	—	MPC · JPL
1	2003 UA435	MBA-M	18.7	540 m	multiple	2003–2019	27 Nov 2019	47	—	MPC · JPL
0	2003 UB435	HIL	16.3	3.1 km	multiple	2003–2019	28 Nov 2019	47	—	MPC · JPL
0	2003 UO435	MBA-I	18.6	570 m	multiple	2003–2018	11 Nov 2018	41	—	MPC · JPL
0	2003 UP435	MBA-I	19.00	470 m	multiple	2003–2021	30 Sep 2021	48	—	MPC · JPL
0	2003 UU435	MBA-I	18.6	570 m	multiple	2003–2021	11 Jun 2021	59	—	MPC · JPL
0	2003 UW435	MBA-O	17.0	2.2 km	multiple	2003–2019	27 Nov 2019	36	—	MPC · JPL
0	2003 UX435	MCA	18.6	570 m	multiple	2003–2019	31 May 2019	40	—	MPC · JPL
0	2003 UL436	MBA-I	19.1	450 m	multiple	2003–2019	01 Jun 2019	47	—	MPC · JPL
1	2003 UO436	MBA-M	18.3	650 m	multiple	1995–2019	25 Sep 2019	41	—	MPC · JPL
0	2003 UP436	MBA-I	18.79	520 m	multiple	2003–2021	01 Nov 2021	52	—	MPC · JPL
1	2003 US436	MBA-O	16.9	2.3 km	multiple	2003–2019	05 Nov 2019	35	—	MPC · JPL
0	2003 UV436 = (887260)	MBA-I	18.4	620 m	multiple	2003–2020	21 Apr 2020	43	—	MPC · JPL
0	2003 UW436	MBA-I	18.89	500 m	multiple	2003–2018	03 Nov 2018	37	—	MPC · JPL
0	2003 UZ436	MBA-O	17.9	1.5 km	multiple	2003–2018	14 Aug 2018	36	—	MPC · JPL
0	2003 UB437	MBA-I	18.58	570 m	multiple	2003–2021	07 Nov 2021	38	—	MPC · JPL
1	2003 UE437	HIL	16.7	2.5 km	multiple	2003–2019	08 Nov 2019	33	—	MPC · JPL
0	2003 UF437	MBA-I	19.02	470 m	multiple	2003–2022	27 Jan 2022	46	—	MPC · JPL
1	2003 UH437	MBA-M	18.8	520 m	multiple	2003–2019	27 Oct 2019	32	—	MPC · JPL
0	2003 UK438	MBA-I	19.2	430 m	multiple	2003–2019	03 Oct 2019	54	—	MPC · JPL
0	2003 UF439	MBA-M	17.9	780 m	multiple	2003–2019	28 Aug 2019	42	—	MPC · JPL
0	2003 UQ439	MBA-M	18.2	680 m	multiple	2003–2019	28 Aug 2019	37	—	MPC · JPL
0	2003 UC440	MBA-M	18.19	1.3 km	multiple	2003–2021	13 Sep 2021	38	—	MPC · JPL
0	2003 UH440	MBA-I	18.8	520 m	multiple	2003–2018	16 Jan 2018	30	—	MPC · JPL
0	2003 UJ440 = (887261)	MBA-I	18.75	530 m	multiple	2003–2021	30 Jun 2021	41	—	MPC · JPL
0	2003 UN440	MBA-I	18.9	490 m	multiple	2003–2019	25 May 2019	32	—	MPC · JPL
0	2003 UQ440	MBA-O	17.2	2.0 km	multiple	2003–2019	24 Aug 2019	28	—	MPC · JPL
0	2003 US440	MBA-O	17.6	1.7 km	multiple	2003–2019	24 Sep 2019	36	—	MPC · JPL
0	2003 UT440	MBA-I	19.1	450 m	multiple	2003–2018	09 Nov 2018	22	—	MPC · JPL
2	2003 UF441	MBA-I	19.1	450 m	multiple	2003–2019	04 Dec 2019	49	—	MPC · JPL
0	2003 UO441	MBA-O	17.5	1.8 km	multiple	2003–2021	18 Jan 2021	47	—	MPC · JPL
1	2003 UQ441	MBA-M	17.8	820 m	multiple	2003–2020	26 Nov 2020	40	—	MPC · JPL
0	2003 UT441 = (887262)	MBA-I	19.0	470 m	multiple	2003–2019	24 Oct 2019	44	—	MPC · JPL
0	2003 UW441	MBA-O	17.3	1.9 km	multiple	2003–2019	03 Oct 2019	25	—	MPC · JPL
0	2003 UX441	MBA-I	19.2	430 m	multiple	2003–2019	23 Oct 2019	31	—	MPC · JPL
0	2003 UY441	MBA-O	17.78	1.5 km	multiple	2003–2019	20 Dec 2019	43	Alt.: 2019 SB12	MPC · JPL
0	2003 UQ442 = (887263)	MBA-I	18.4	620 m	multiple	2003–2020	12 Sep 2020	43	—	MPC · JPL
0	2003 UZ442	MBA-O	17.2	2.0 km	multiple	2003–2019	26 Oct 2019	34	—	MPC · JPL
0	2003 UB443	MBA-O	17.6	1.7 km	multiple	2003–2019	28 Dec 2019	40	—	MPC · JPL
0	2003 UF443 = (887264)	MBA-M	18.16	1.3 km	multiple	2003–2021	29 Oct 2021	55	—	MPC · JPL
1	2003 UJ443	MBA-M	19.1	450 m	multiple	2003–2019	25 Jul 2019	43	—	MPC · JPL
1	2003 UP443	HIL	16.5	2.8 km	multiple	2003–2019	04 Nov 2019	32	—	MPC · JPL
0	2003 UU443	MBA-O	17.8	1.5 km	multiple	2003–2021	16 Jan 2021	32	—	MPC · JPL
0	2003 UV443	MBA-O	17.4	1.8 km	multiple	2003–2021	18 Jan 2021	39	—	MPC · JPL
0	2003 UY443	MBA-M	18.0	750 m	multiple	2003–2020	17 Dec 2020	30	—	MPC · JPL
1	2003 UB444	MBA-I	19.5	370 m	multiple	2003–2016	27 Aug 2016	34	—	MPC · JPL
3	2003 UD444	MBA-O	18.6	1.1 km	multiple	2003–2019	26 Sep 2019	19	— Added on 22 July 2020	MPC · JPL
1	2003 UG444	MBA-O	17.6	1.7 km	multiple	2003–2018	06 Oct 2018	37	— Added on 22 July 2020	MPC · JPL
1	2003 UJ444	MBA-O	16.6	2.7 km	multiple	2003–2019	28 Dec 2019	35	— Added on 22 July 2020	MPC · JPL
1	2003 UP444	MBA-M	18.4	620 m	multiple	2003–2019	03 Oct 2019	35	— Added on 22 July 2020	MPC · JPL
0	2003 UU444	MCA	19.0	470 m	multiple	2003–2020	15 Aug 2020	36	Disc.: NEAT; Added on 19 October 2020	MPC · JPL
0	2003 UZ444	MBA-O	17.3	1.9 km	multiple	2003–2020	14 Nov 2020	52	Disc.: LPL/Spacewatch II; Added on 19 October 2020	MPC · JPL
0	2003 UE445	MBA-I	18.67	550 m	multiple	2003–2021	02 Dec 2021	70	Disc.: Spacewatch; Added on 19 October 2020	MPC · JPL
0	2003 UF445	MBA-M	18.00	1.1 km	multiple	2003–2022	27 Jan 2022	45	Disc.: LPL/Spacewatch II; Added on 19 October 2020	MPC · JPL
2	2003 UH445	MBA-I	18.7	540 m	multiple	2003–2017	24 Oct 2017	28	Disc.: LPL/Spacewatch II; Added on 19 October 2020	MPC · JPL
1	2003 UJ445	MBA-M	18.80	970 m	multiple	2003–2021	01 Dec 2021	20	Disc.: Spacewatch; Added on 19 October 2020	MPC · JPL
0	2003 UK445	MBA-M	18.32	1.2 km	multiple	2003–2021	03 Oct 2021	41	Disc.: Spacewatch; Added on 19 October 2020	MPC · JPL
0	2003 UM445	MBA-M	17.78	1.5 km	multiple	2003–2021	06 Nov 2021	76	Disc.: Spacewatch; Added on 19 October 2020	MPC · JPL
0	2003 UO445	MBA-O	17.14	2.1 km	multiple	2003–2022	08 Jan 2022	53	Disc.: Spacewatch; Added on 17 January 2021; Alt.: 2010 CW7	MPC · JPL
2	2003 UR445	MBA-O	17.1	2.1 km	multiple	2003–2020	20 Dec 2020	33	Disc.: Spacewatch; Added on 17 January 2021	MPC · JPL
0	2003 UV445	MBA-O	17.54	1.7 km	multiple	2003–2021	08 Dec 2021	30	Disc.: Pan-STARRS; Added on 17 January 2021	MPC · JPL
0	2003 UW445	MBA-M	18.1	1.0 km	multiple	2003–2020	15 Sep 2020	31	Disc.: Spacewatch; Added on 17 January 2021	MPC · JPL
0	2003 UX445	MBA-M	18.7	760 m	multiple	2003–2020	12 Sep 2020	31	Disc.: Spacewatch; Added on 17 January 2021	MPC · JPL
1	2003 UZ445	MBA-O	17.8	1.5 km	multiple	2003–2019	27 Oct 2019	22	Disc.: LPL/Spacewatch II; Added on 17 January 2021	MPC · JPL
0	2003 UA446	MBA-M	18.5	840 m	multiple	2003–2020	17 Oct 2020	65	Disc.: Spacewatch; Added on 17 January 2021	MPC · JPL
0	2003 UE446	MBA-O	17.1	2.1 km	multiple	2003–2021	12 Jan 2021	35	Disc.: SDSS; Added on 17 January 2021	MPC · JPL
0	2003 UF446	MBA-O	17.6	1.7 km	multiple	2003–2021	05 Jan 2021	58	Disc.: Spacewatch; Added on 17 January 2021	MPC · JPL
0	2003 UL446	MBA-I	19.5	370 m	multiple	2003–2018	06 Oct 2018	29	Disc.: SDSS; Added on 17 January 2021	MPC · JPL
1	2003 UM446	MBA-M	19.57	510 m	multiple	2003–2021	06 Jan 2021	29	Disc.: SDSS; Added on 17 January 2021	MPC · JPL
0	2003 UP446	MBA-M	19.0	670 m	multiple	2003–2020	08 Dec 2020	60	Disc.: Spacewatch; Added on 17 January 2021	MPC · JPL
0	2003 UB447	MBA-I	18.9	490 m	multiple	2003–2020	16 Nov 2020	41	Disc.: Spacewatch; Added on 17 January 2021	MPC · JPL
0	2003 UD447	MBA-O	17.4	1.8 km	multiple	2003–2021	11 Jan 2021	35	Disc.: SDSS; Added on 17 January 2021	MPC · JPL
1	2003 UF447	MBA-O	17.6	1.7 km	multiple	2003–2020	10 Dec 2020	34	Disc.: LPL/Spacewatch II; Added on 17 January 2021	MPC · JPL
2	2003 UK447	MBA-M	18.3	1.2 km	multiple	2003–2019	02 Jun 2019	18	Disc.: Kitt Peak Obs. Added on 9 March 2021	MPC · JPL
0	2003 UL447	MBA-I	19.24	420 m	multiple	2003–2021	31 Oct 2021	28	Disc.: Kitt Peak Obs. Added on 9 March 2021	MPC · JPL
0	2003 UM447	MBA-M	18.3	650 m	multiple	2003–2021	16 Jan 2021	30	Disc.: Spacewatch; Added on 9 March 2021	MPC · JPL
1	2003 UO447	MBA-O	17.0	2.2 km	multiple	2003–2020	12 Dec 2020	31	Disc.: Spacewatch; Added on 9 March 2021	MPC · JPL
0	2003 UP447	MBA-I	19.1	450 m	multiple	2003–2020	10 Nov 2020	20	Disc.: Spacewatch; Added on 9 March 2021	MPC · JPL
0	2003 UQ447 = (887265)	MBA-M	18.2	960 m	multiple	2003–2020	08 Dec 2020	28	Disc.: Spacewatch; Added on 11 May 2021	MPC · JPL
1	2003 UR447	MBA-O	17.1	2.1 km	multiple	2003–2020	04 Dec 2020	23	Disc.: Spacewatch; Added on 11 May 2021	MPC · JPL
1	2003 US447	MBA-M	18.5	840 m	multiple	2003–2020	10 Dec 2020	17	Disc.: Spacewatch; Added on 11 May 2021	MPC · JPL
0	2003 UU447	MBA-I	18.7	540 m	multiple	2003–2020	15 Oct 2020	28	Disc.: Spacewatch; Added on 11 May 2021	MPC · JPL
2	2003 UZ447	MBA-I	18.7	540 m	multiple	2003–2014	25 Oct 2014	28	Disc.: Spacewatch; Added on 17 June 2021	MPC · JPL
4	2003 UJ448	MBA-M	18.7	760 m	multiple	2003–2016	26 Oct 2016	16	Disc.: LPL/Spacewatch II; Added on 21 August 2021	MPC · JPL
0	2003 UN448	MBA-I	19.3	410 m	multiple	2003–2019	01 Jun 2019	33	Disc.: LPL/Spacewatch II; Added on 21 August 2021	MPC · JPL
0	2003 UE449	MBA-M	18.3	1.2 km	multiple	2001–2021	11 Sep 2021	36	Disc.: SDSS; Added on 30 September 2021	MPC · JPL
0	2003 UF449	MBA-I	18.8	520 m	multiple	2003–2021	13 Sep 2021	31	Disc.: Kitt Peak Obs. Added on 30 September 2021	MPC · JPL
0	2003 UH449	MBA-I	18.94	480 m	multiple	2003–2021	06 Nov 2021	43	Disc.: SDSS; Added on 5 November 2021	MPC · JPL
1	2003 UJ449	MBA-M	19.48	710 m	multiple	2003–2021	09 Nov 2021	58	Disc.: Spacewatch; Added on 5 November 2021	MPC · JPL
0	2003 UM449	MBA-I	18.46	600 m	multiple	2003–2021	03 Oct 2021	34	Disc.: Spacewatch; Added on 5 November 2021	MPC · JPL
0	2003 UN449	MBA-I	19.26	420 m	multiple	2003–2021	26 Nov 2021	55	Disc.: Spacewatch; Added on 5 November 2021	MPC · JPL
0	2003 UP449	MBA-M	17.6	1.7 km	multiple	2003–2021	23 Oct 2021	33	Disc.: Spacewatch; Added on 5 November 2021	MPC · JPL
0	2003 UR449	MBA-I	18.99	470 m	multiple	2003–2021	09 Nov 2021	49	Disc.: Spacewatch; Added on 5 November 2021	MPC · JPL
1	2003 US449	MBA-M	18.76	990 m	multiple	2002–2021	09 Nov 2021	44	Disc.: Spacewatch; Added on 5 November 2021	MPC · JPL
0	2003 UT449	MBA-I	18.73	530 m	multiple	2003–2021	06 Nov 2021	34	Disc.: Kitt Peak Obs. Added on 5 November 2021	MPC · JPL
1	2003 UV449	MBA-M	18.63	1.0 km	multiple	2003–2021	02 Dec 2021	70	Disc.: SDSS; Added on 24 December 2021	MPC · JPL
0	2003 UX449	MBA-I	19.31	410 m	multiple	2003–2021	28 Nov 2021	31	Disc.: Spacewatch; Added on 24 December 2021	MPC · JPL
0	2003 UZ449	HUN	18.9	490 m	multiple	2003–2021	02 Dec 2021	37	Disc.: Spacewatch; Added on 24 December 2021	MPC · JPL
0	2003 UB450	MBA-I	19.4	390 m	multiple	2003–2021	10 Aug 2021	21	Disc.: SDSS; Added on 29 January 2022	MPC · JPL
3	2003 UC450	MBA-O	17.9	1.5 km	multiple	2003–2016	31 Mar 2016	14	Disc.: Kitt Peak Obs. Added on 29 January 2022	MPC · JPL
0	2003 UE450	MBA-M	17.7	1.6 km	multiple	2003–2021	30 Sep 2021	36	Disc.: No observations Added on 29 January 2022	MPC · JPL

back to top
