= List of unnumbered minor planets: 2003 S (390–442) =

This is a partial list of unnumbered minor planets for principal provisional designations assigned during 16–30 September 2003. Since this period yielded a high number of provisional discoveries, it is further split into several standalone pages. As of November 2025, a total of 149 bodies remain unnumbered for this period. Objects for this year are listed on the following pages: A–E · F–G · H–L · M–R · S_{i} · S_{ii} · S_{iii} · S_{iv} · T · U_{i} · U_{ii} · U_{iii} · U_{iv} · V · W_{i} · W_{ii} and X–Y. Also see previous and next year.

Near-Earth obj.	MBA (inner)	MBA (outer)	Centaur
Mars-crosser	MBA (middle)	Jupiter trojan	Trans-Neptunian obj.
Unclassified

== S ==
U	Designation	Class	Physical		Observations				Description and notes	Ref
U	Designation	Class	H	D	Opp.	Arc	Last	Used	Description and notes	Ref
3	2003 SK390	MBA-O	17.8	1.5 km	multiple	2003–2019	07 Sep 2019	14	Disc.: SDSS; Added on 17 January 2021	MPC · JPL
0	2003 SS390	MBA-I	19.1	450 m	multiple	2003–2020	14 Nov 2020	32	Disc.: SDSS	MPC · JPL
1	2003 SX390	MBA-M	18.00	1.4 km	multiple	2003–2021	29 Sep 2021	51	Disc.: SDSS	MPC · JPL
2	2003 SD391	MCA	20.2	270 m	multiple	2003–2020	09 Oct 2020	23	Disc.: SDSS; Added on 17 January 2021	MPC · JPL
1	2003 SO391	MBA-O	17.8	1.5 km	multiple	2003–2019	05 Jul 2019	33	Disc.: SDSS; Alt.: 2014 WZ250	MPC · JPL
0	2003 SR391	MBA-M	17.88	1.5 km	multiple	2003–2021	04 Oct 2021	58	Disc.: SDSS; Alt.: 2005 EL111, 2005 EN333	MPC · JPL
3	2003 SU392	MBA-O	17.5	1.8 km	multiple	2003–2019	02 Nov 2019	46	Disc.: SDSS; Alt.: 2014 WN473	MPC · JPL
0	2003 SW392	MBA-M	18.59	800 m	multiple	2003–2021	02 Dec 2021	40	Disc.: SDSS; Added on 24 December 2021	MPC · JPL
0	2003 SR393	MBA-I	19.0	470 m	multiple	2003–2021	11 Jan 2021	67	Disc.: SDSS; Added on 17 January 2021; Alt.: 2020 SH22	MPC · JPL
0	2003 ST393	MBA-M	19.1	640 m	multiple	2003–2020	20 Oct 2020	17	Disc.: SDSS; Added on 17 June 2021	MPC · JPL
1	2003 SU393	MBA-O	17.9	1 km	multiple	2003-2024	04 Dec 2024 2003	18	Disc.: SDSS; Alt.: 2024 WG73	MPC · JPL
1	2003 SZ393	MBA-I	19.6	360 m	multiple	2003–2020	15 May 2020	40	Disc.: SDSS; Alt.: 2010 TN135	MPC · JPL
0	2003 SA394	MBA-I	19.3	410 m	multiple	2003–2019	24 Aug 2019	27	Disc.: SDSS	MPC · JPL
0	2003 SQ394	MBA-I	19.0	470 m	multiple	2003–2020	06 Dec 2020	57	Disc.: SDSS	MPC · JPL
2	2003 SR394	MBA-I	19.7	340 m	multiple	2003–2017	24 Nov 2017	18	Disc.: SDSS	MPC · JPL
1	2003 SV394	MBA-I	18.5	590 m	multiple	2003–2020	29 Jun 2020	33	Disc.: SDSS	MPC · JPL
0	2003 SA396	MBA-M	18.58	800 m	multiple	2003-2016	27 Oct 2016	26	Disc.: SDSS; Added on 29 January 2022	MPC · JPL
–	2003 SC396	MBA-M	19.9	310 m	single	2 days	28 Sep 2003	6	Disc.: SDSS	MPC · JPL
1	2003 SK396	MBA-M	18.52	1.1 km	multiple	2003–2021	12 Nov 2021	46	Disc.: SDSS	MPC · JPL
0	2003 SV396	MBA-I	18.76	530 m	multiple	2003–2021	19 Nov 2021	62	Disc.: SDSS; Alt.: 2019 AA36	MPC · JPL
2	2003 SC397	MBA-I	19.8	340 m	multiple	2003-2025	20 Jan 2025	21	Disc.: SDSS	MPC · JPL
2	2003 SG397	MBA-M	19.3	580 m	multiple	2003–2016	27 Oct 2016	15	Disc.: SDSS; Added on 29 January 2022	MPC · JPL
1	2003 SH397	MBA-M	18.1	710 m	multiple	2003–2015	16 Oct 2015	42	Disc.: SDSS; Alt.: 2015 PW20	MPC · JPL
1	2003 SL397	MBA-I	19.5	370 m	multiple	2003–2021	13 Nov 2021	14	Disc.: SDSS	MPC · JPL
0	2003 SP397	MBA-M	18.26	1.2 km	multiple	2003–2021	08 Aug 2021	53	Disc.: SDSS; Alt.: 2017 OJ67	MPC · JPL
0	2003 SV397	MBA-M	17.59	1.7 km	multiple	2003–2021	06 Nov 2021	80	Disc.: SDSS; Added on 17 January 2021; Alt.: 2017 VW43	MPC · JPL
1	2003 SX397	MBA-M	18.3	650 m	multiple	2003–2019	04 Oct 2019	39	Disc.: SDSS	MPC · JPL
1	2003 SL398	HIL	16.0	3.5 km	multiple	2003–2019	20 Dec 2019	68	Disc.: SDSS	MPC · JPL
2	2003 SS398	MBA-I	19.5	370 m	multiple	2003–2016	30 Sep 2016	19	Disc.: SDSS	MPC · JPL
2	2003 SG399	MBA-O	17.9	1.5 km	multiple	2003–2019	26 Sep 2019	18	Disc.: SDSS	MPC · JPL
3	2003 SU399	MBA-I	19.14	360 m	multiple	2003-2022	21 Sep 2022	31	Disc.: SDSS	MPC · JPL
0	2003 SB401	MBA-I	18.7	540 m	multiple	2003–2018	06 Oct 2018	38	Disc.: SDSS	MPC · JPL
0	2003 SR401	MBA-M	17.9	1.1 km	multiple	2003–2020	20 Nov 2020	43	Disc.: SDSS	MPC · JPL
2	2003 SA402	MBA-M	17.9	1.5 km	multiple	2003–2017	11 Dec 2017	54	Disc.: SDSS; Alt.: 2017 UD50	MPC · JPL
2	2003 SP402	MBA-M	18.0	1.4 km	multiple	2003–2017	23 Oct 2017	20	Disc.: Spacewatch	MPC · JPL
2	2003 SU402	MBA-O	17.66	1.1 km	multiple	2003-2024	28 Nov 2024	31	Disc.: Spacewatch	MPC · JPL
1	2003 SC403	MBA-M	18.5	840 m	multiple	2003–2020	11 Oct 2020	44	Disc.: Spacewatch	MPC · JPL
0	2003 SD403 = (887236)	MBA-I	19.26	420 m	multiple	2003–2021	07 Sep 2021	43	Disc.: Spacewatch	MPC · JPL
0	2003 SK404	MBA-I	18.7	540 m	multiple	2003–2017	18 Sep 2017	22	Disc.: SDSS; Added on 22 July 2020; Alt.: 2017 SY8	MPC · JPL
0	2003 SN404	MBA-I	19.3	410 m	multiple	2003–2020	11 Aug 2020	27	Disc.: SDSS; Alt.: 2020 MC19	MPC · JPL
1	2003 SY404	MBA-I	19.1	450 m	multiple	2003–2016	25 Sep 2016	32	Disc.: SDSS; Added on 21 August 2021	MPC · JPL
0	2003 SC405	MBA-O	16.92	2.2 km	multiple	2003-2022	05 Feb 2022	39	Disc.: SDSS	MPC · JPL
0	2003 SS405	MBA-M	18.8	730 m	multiple	2003–2020	09 Oct 2020	29	Disc.: SDSS; Added on 17 January 2021	MPC · JPL
1	2003 SW405	MBA-M	20.05	420 m	multiple	2003-2024	07 Oct 2024	26	Disc.: SDSS	MPC · JPL
0	2003 ST406	MBA-O	17.7	1.6 km	multiple	2003–2020	08 Dec 2020	38	Disc.: SDSS	MPC · JPL
2	2003 SC408	MBA-M	17.74	1.4 km	multiple	2003-2022 days	21 Sep 2022	36	Disc.: SDSS	MPC · JPL
0	2003 SN408	MCA	19.86	320 m	multiple	2003–2020	17 Nov 2020	39	Disc.: Spacewatch	MPC · JPL
0	2003 SU408	MBA-I	18.60	570 m	multiple	2003–2021	08 Sep 2021	38	Disc.: SDSS; Alt.: 2014 QT417	MPC · JPL
0	2003 SZ408	MBA-O	17.5	1.8 km	multiple	2003–2020	12 Dec 2020	52	Disc.: SDSS; Alt.: 2014 SM342	MPC · JPL
0	2003 SB409	MBA-M	18.7	760 m	multiple	2003–2020	22 Sep 2020	25	Disc.: SDSS; Added on 17 January 2021	MPC · JPL
2	2003 SC409	MBA-I	19.5	370 m	multiple	2003–2014	15 Sep 2014	18	Disc.: SDSS; Alt.: 2014 QW13	MPC · JPL
0	2003 SD409	MCA	18.0	750 m	multiple	2003–2017	16 Apr 2017	37	Disc.: LPL/Spacewatch II; Alt.: 2017 FF25	MPC · JPL
4	2003 SJ409	MBA-I	19.2	430 m	multiple	2003–2014	01 Oct 2014	16	Disc.: SDSS; Added on 5 November 2021; Alt.: 2014 SC86	MPC · JPL
0	2003 SK409	MBA-I	19.36	400 m	multiple	2003–2021	08 Sep 2021	40	Disc.: SDSS	MPC · JPL
0	2003 SL409	MBA-O	17.8	1.5 km	multiple	2003–2020	13 Sep 2020	20	Disc.: LPL/Spacewatch II; Added on 17 June 2021	MPC · JPL
0	2003 SQ409	MBA-M	18.26	1.2 km	multiple	2003–2021	29 Aug 2021	33	Disc.: SDSS	MPC · JPL
0	2003 SR409	MBA-O	17.8	1.5 km	multiple	2003–2020	22 Oct 2020	28	Disc.: SDSS	MPC · JPL
–	2003 ST409	MBA-M	19.1	840 m	single	13 days	29 Sep 2003	7	Disc.: SDSS	MPC · JPL
0	2003 SW409	MBA-M	18.70	1.0 km	multiple	1994–2021	31 Oct 2021	69	Disc.: LPL/Spacewatch II; Alt.: 2012 SJ72	MPC · JPL
3	2003 SC410	MBA-O	18.1	1.3 km	multiple	2003–2019	25 Sep 2019	41	Disc.: LPL/Spacewatch II	MPC · JPL
0	2003 SJ410	MBA-I	19.6	360 m	multiple	2003–2021	30 Nov 2021	23	Disc.: LPL/Spacewatch II; Added on 24 December 2021	MPC · JPL
0	2003 SZ410	MBA-I	18.7	540 m	multiple	2003–2016	28 Feb 2016	25	Disc.: SDSS; Alt.: 2007 UC118	MPC · JPL
–	2003 SQ411	MBA-I	19.4	390 m	single	2 days	29 Sep 2003	7	Disc.: SDSS	MPC · JPL
1	2003 SR411	MBA-I	19.36	400 m	multiple	2003–2021	13 Jul 2021	46	Disc.: SDSS; Alt.: 2014 SU332	MPC · JPL
0	2003 SX411	MBA-O	17.1	2.1 km	multiple	2003–2018	18 Mar 2018	36	Disc.: SDSS; Alt.: 2014 SH102	MPC · JPL
2	2003 SG412	MBA-I	18.7	540 m	multiple	2003–2018	10 Nov 2018	43	Disc.: SDSS; Alt.: 2014 RJ38	MPC · JPL
0	2003 SK412	MBA-I	19.9	310 m	multiple	2003–2018	05 Oct 2018	34	Disc.: SDSS; Alt.: 2014 OW322	MPC · JPL
1	2003 SO412	MBA-M	19.7	480 m	multiple	2003–2020	13 Sep 2020	28	Disc.: SDSS	MPC · JPL
0	2003 SF413	MBA-O	17.0	2.2 km	multiple	2003–2020	11 Sep 2020	27	Disc.: Spacewatch; Alt.: 2003 SV345, 2015 UR63	MPC · JPL
0	2003 SO413	MBA-O	17.8	1.5 km	multiple	2003–2021	19 Feb 2021	31	Disc.: SDSS; Added on 11 May 2021	MPC · JPL
2	2003 ST413	MBA-M	18.5	1.1 km	multiple	2003–2017	22 Oct 2017	24	Disc.: SDSS	MPC · JPL
1	2003 SZ413	MBA-M	19.28	780 m	multiple	2003–2021	27 Oct 2021	43	Disc.: SDSS	MPC · JPL
0	2003 SH414	MBA-O	17.6	1.7 km	multiple	2001–2016	10 Mar 2016	29	Disc.: SDSS; Added on 17 January 2021; Alt.: 2016 DD10	MPC · JPL
0	2003 SJ414	MBA-M	18.96	640 m	multiple	2003-2021	27 Dec 2021	43	Disc.: SDSS	MPC · JPL
3	2003 SN414	MBA-I	20.0	300 m	multiple	2003–2021	12 Sep 2021	28	Disc.: SDSS; Added on 30 September 2021; Alt.: 2003 SQ380	MPC · JPL
0	2003 SO414	MBA-M	18.10	1.0 km	multiple	2001–2022	09 Jan 2022	41	Disc.: SDSS; Added on 19 October 2020; Alt.: 2018 AT16	MPC · JPL
0	2003 SP414	MBA-M	17.78	1.5 km	multiple	2003–2021	02 Oct 2021	50	Disc.: SDSS; Added on 22 July 2020	MPC · JPL
–	2003 SS414	MBA-I	19.8	330 m	single	3 days	29 Sep 2003	7	Disc.: SDSS	MPC · JPL
2	2003 ST414	MBA-I	19.4	390 m	multiple	2003–2017	23 Oct 2017	32	Disc.: SDSS; Alt.: 2010 TB159	MPC · JPL
0	2003 SD415	MBA-M	18.41	870 m	multiple	2003–2022	25 Jan 2022	44	Disc.: SDSS; Added on 17 January 2021	MPC · JPL
0	2003 SF415	MBA-M	18.5	840 m	multiple	2003–2020	23 Oct 2020	29	Disc.: SDSS; Added on 17 June 2021	MPC · JPL
0	2003 SE416	MBA-I	18.77	520 m	multiple	2003–2021	11 Oct 2021	59	Disc.: SDSS	MPC · JPL
2	2003 SO416	MBA-I	19.7	340 m	multiple	2003–2020	08 Oct 2020	19	Disc.: SDSS; Added on 17 January 2021	MPC · JPL
1	2003 SP416	MBA-I	19.6	360 m	multiple	2003–2016	27 Aug 2016	16	Disc.: SDSS; Added on 17 January 2021	MPC · JPL
1	2003 ST416	MBA-M	17.98	1.4 km	multiple	2003–2021	08 Sep 2021	37	Disc.: SDSS; Added on 21 August 2021; Alt.: 2008 WZ75	MPC · JPL
1	2003 SL417	MBA-I	19.14	440 m	multiple	2003–2021	31 Jul 2021	29	Disc.: SDSS; Alt.: 2014 QT335	MPC · JPL
0	2003 SP417	MBA-M	18.0	750 m	multiple	2003–2021	06 Jan 2021	31	Disc.: SDSS; Added on 30 September 2021; Alt.: 2007 RX355	MPC · JPL
0	2003 ST417	MBA-O	17.7	1.6 km	multiple	2003–2020	19 Nov 2020	29	Disc.: SDSS	MPC · JPL
0	2003 SU417	MCA	19.3	410 m	multiple	2003–2019	24 Sep 2019	26	Disc.: SDSS; Added on 22 July 2020	MPC · JPL
0	2003 SA418	MBA-M	18.2	960 m	multiple	2003–2020	20 Oct 2020	55	Disc.: SDSS	MPC · JPL
0	2003 SJ418	MBA-I	19.21	430 m	multiple	2003–2021	29 Nov 2021	25	Disc.: SDSS; Added on 24 December 2021	MPC · JPL
1	2003 SN418	MBA-M	18.2	680 m	multiple	2003–2021	18 Jan 2021	41	Disc.: SDSS	MPC · JPL
0	2003 SS418	MBA-O	17.7	1.6 km	multiple	2003–2019	19 Dec 2019	23	Disc.: SDSS	MPC · JPL
1	2003 SM419	MBA-M	18.1	1.0 km	multiple	2003–2020	14 Sep 2020	27	Disc.: SDSS; Added on 19 October 2020	MPC · JPL
1	2003 SY419	MBA-O	17.2	2.0 km	multiple	2003–2015	16 Jan 2015	17	Disc.: SDSS; Alt.: 2014 WP325	MPC · JPL
0	2003 SS420	MBA-O	17.9	1.5 km	multiple	2003–2019	05 Nov 2019	24	Disc.: SDSS; Added on 17 January 2021	MPC · JPL
0	2003 ST420	MBA-I	18.9	490 m	multiple	2003–2021	18 Jan 2021	33	Disc.: SDSS; Alt.: 2013 TW37	MPC · JPL
0	2003 SC421	MBA-O	17.5	1.8 km	multiple	2003-2023	27 Mar 2023	29	Disc.: SDSS	MPC · JPL
0	2003 SL421	HUN	19.98	300 m	multiple	2003–2021	07 Nov 2021	33	Disc.: SDSS; Added on 5 November 2021	MPC · JPL
1	2003 SD422	MBA-O	17.4	1.8 km	multiple	2003–2020	17 Oct 2020	37	Disc.: SDSS; Alt.: 2003 UL332, 2020 RO31	MPC · JPL
1	2003 SE422	MBA-I	18.54	580 m	multiple	2003–2021	07 Sep 2021	30	Disc.: SDSS; Alt.: 2014 QJ322	MPC · JPL
D	2003 SJ422	MBA-O	18.2	1.3 km	single	28 days	24 Oct 2003	8	Disc.: SDSS; Alt.: 2003 UP385	MPC · JPL
0	2003 SN422	MBA-I	18.8	520 m	multiple	2003–2018	04 Dec 2018	47	Disc.: SDSS; Alt.: 2003 UR352	MPC · JPL
0	2003 SO422	MBA-I	18.73	530 m	multiple	2003–2021	27 Oct 2021	41	Disc.: SDSS; Added on 5 November 2021	MPC · JPL
3	2003 SS422	TNO	7.20	137 km	multiple	2000–2020	18 Nov 2020	48	Disc.: Cerro Tololo; LoUTNOs, SDO	MPC · JPL
0	2003 SU422	MBA-I	18.2	680 m	multiple	2003–2020	02 Feb 2020	47	Disc.: LPL/Spacewatch II	MPC · JPL
0	2003 SD424	MBA-O	17.1	2.1 km	multiple	2003–2020	09 Sep 2020	33	Disc.: Mauna Kea Obs.	MPC · JPL
1	2003 SL424	MBA-O	17.3	1.9 km	multiple	2003–2019	26 Sep 2019	40	Disc.: Mauna Kea Obs.	MPC · JPL
0	2003 SH425	MBA-M	18.1	1.3 km	multiple	2003–2021	04 Oct 2021	26	Disc.: SDSS; Added on 29 January 2022	MPC · JPL
0	2003 SK425	MBA-O	17.7	1.6 km	multiple	2003–2020	17 Oct 2020	52	Disc.: SDSS; Alt.: 2014 SP238	MPC · JPL
0	2003 SW425	MBA-M	19.0	670 m	multiple	2003–2020	11 Dec 2020	46	Disc.: Mauna Kea Obs. Alt.: 2020 SJ32	MPC · JPL
0	2003 SJ426	MBA-O	17.5	1.8 km	multiple	2000–2020	13 Sep 2020	40	Disc.: Mauna Kea Obs. Added on 17 January 2021; Alt.: 2014 OG305	MPC · JPL
0	2003 SQ426	MBA-I	18.67	370 m	multiple	2003-2025	29 Mar 2025	66	Disc.: Mauna Kea Obs.	MPC · JPL
1	2003 ST426	MBA-O	18.6	1.1 km	multiple	2003–2019	02 Nov 2019	27	Disc.: Mauna Kea Obs. Added on 11 May 2021; Alt.: 2014 WS587	MPC · JPL
2	2003 SV426	MBA-M	18.3	1.2 km	multiple	2003-2023	12 Nov 2023	36	Disc.: Mauna Kea Obs.	MPC · JPL
0	2003 SZ426	MBA-I	19.13	440 m	multiple	2003–2021	08 May 2021	36	Disc.: Mauna Kea Obs.	MPC · JPL
0	2003 SB427	MBA-M	18.16	1.3 km	multiple	2001–2021	09 Aug 2021	42	Disc.: Mauna Kea Obs. Alt.: 2010 KL13	MPC · JPL
0	2003 SY427	MBA-O	17.2	2.0 km	multiple	1998–2020	04 Jan 2020	30	Disc.: Spacewatch	MPC · JPL
3	2003 SA428	MBA-M	18.7	760 m	multiple	2003–2016	02 Oct 2016	28	Disc.: Spacewatch	MPC · JPL
3	2003 SM428	MBA-M	19.0	880 m	multiple	2003–2017	24 Nov 2017	28	Disc.: Spacewatch	MPC · JPL
–	2003 SP428	MBA-M	19.0	470 m	single	11 days	29 Sep 2003	11	Disc.: Spacewatch	MPC · JPL
0	2003 SU428	MBA-M	17.5	1.8 km	multiple	2001–2017	24 Oct 2017	73	Disc.: Spacewatch	MPC · JPL
1	2003 SM429	MCA	19.26	340 m	multiple	2003-2022	28 Sep 2022	28	Disc.: SDSS	MPC · JPL
0	2003 SD430	HUN	19.92	420 m	multiple	2003-2024	09 Sep 2024	29	Disc.: Spacewatch; Alt.: 2024 PA15	MPC · JPL
0	2003 SE430	MBA-M	18.57	810 m	multiple	2003–2020	17 Oct 2020	36	Disc.: Spacewatch; Alt.: 2020 SQ21	MPC · JPL
0	2003 SA432	MBA-O	17.4	1.8 km	multiple	2003–2019	20 Sep 2019	29	Disc.: Spacewatch	MPC · JPL
1	2003 SB432	MBA-M	18.94	680 m	multiple	2003–2021	30 Nov 2021	25	Disc.: Spacewatch	MPC · JPL
0	2003 SB433	MBA-M	19.0	670 m	multiple	2003–2020	16 Oct 2020	25	Disc.: LPL/Spacewatch II	MPC · JPL
0	2003 SE433	MBA-I	18.3	650 m	multiple	2003–2018	11 Jul 2018	45	Disc.: SDSS	MPC · JPL
0	2003 SE434	MBA-O	17.8	1.5 km	multiple	2003–2020	26 Jan 2020	26	Disc.: SDSS	MPC · JPL
0	2003 SK434	MBA-M	18.29	1.2 km	multiple	2003–2021	04 Oct 2021	47	Disc.: SDSS; Alt.: 2017 XQ20	MPC · JPL
0	2003 SV434	MBA-M	18.60	800 m	multiple	2003–2020	08 Oct 2020	29	Disc.: SDSS; Added on 17 January 2021	MPC · JPL
2	2003 SD435	MBA-I	19.6	360 m	multiple	2003–2014	18 Sep 2014	30	Disc.: SDSS; Alt.: 2003 SM349, 2014 RS54	MPC · JPL
1	2003 SH435	MCA	19.0	470 m	multiple	2003–2007	02 Nov 2007	19	Disc.: NEAT	MPC · JPL
1	2003 SJ435	MBA-I	19.2	430 m	multiple	2003–2020	11 Dec 2020	37	Disc.: NEAT	MPC · JPL
2	2003 SM435	MBA-I	18.7	540 m	multiple	2003–2019	02 Jan 2019	37	Disc.: NEAT	MPC · JPL
0	2003 SY435	MBA-I	18.6	570 m	multiple	2003–2020	22 Dec 2020	54	Disc.: LONEOS	MPC · JPL
0	2003 SA436	MBA-I	18.29	650 m	multiple	2003–2021	30 Aug 2021	54	Disc.: LONEOS	MPC · JPL
0	2003 SG440	MCA	19.3	410 m	multiple	2003–2019	04 Jul 2019	58	Disc.: Spacewatch	MPC · JPL
0	2003 SH440	MBA-I	18.8	520 m	multiple	2003–2018	06 Oct 2018	49	Disc.: Spacewatch	MPC · JPL
0	2003 SN440	MBA-I	18.8	520 m	multiple	2003–2018	17 Nov 2018	53	Disc.: Spacewatch	MPC · JPL

back to top
