= List of unnumbered minor planets: 2003 S (0–269) =

This is a partial list of unnumbered minor planets for principal provisional designations assigned during 16–30 September 2003. Since this period yielded a high number of provisional discoveries, it is further split into several standalone pages. As of November 2025, a total of 192 bodies remain unnumbered for this period. Objects for this year are listed on the following pages: A–E · F–G · H–L · M–R · S_{i} · S_{ii} · S_{iii} · S_{iv} · T · U_{i} · U_{ii} · U_{iii} · U_{iv} · V · W_{i} · W_{ii} and X–Y. Also see previous and next year.

Near-Earth obj.	MBA (inner)	MBA (outer)	Centaur
Mars-crosser	MBA (middle)	Jupiter trojan	Trans-Neptunian obj.
Unclassified

== S ==
U	Designation	Class	Physical		Observations				Description and notes	Ref
U	Designation	Class	H	D	Opp.	Arc	Last	Used	Description and notes	Ref
2	2003 SA	MCA	20.0	300 m	multiple	2003–2014	24 Sep 2014	106	Disc.: LONEOS; Alt.: 2014 SK144	MPC · JPL
1	2003 SD	MCA	19.6	360 m	multiple	2003–2017	23 Oct 2017	61	Disc.: NEAT	MPC · JPL
0	2003 SU	MBA-I	18.8	520 m	multiple	2003–2018	30 Sep 2018	48	Disc.: Spacewatch	MPC · JPL
1	2003 SN1	MBA-O	17.8	1.5 km	multiple	2003–2019	28 Oct 2019	29	Disc.: Spacewatch	MPC · JPL
0	2003 SZ1	MBA-O	17.4	1.8 km	multiple	2003–2020	16 Aug 2020	29	Disc.: Spacewatch; Added on 21 August 2021; Alt.: 2020 OY100	MPC · JPL
1	2003 SU3	MBA-I	19.0	470 m	multiple	1996–2021	28 Nov 2021	52	Disc.: LPL/Spacewatch II; Added on 24 December 2021	MPC · JPL
6	2003 SY4	APO	26.5	18 m	single	10 days	26 Sep 2003	66	Disc.: LPL/Spacewatch II	MPC · JPL
9	2003 SJ5	MCA	19.9	440 m	single	2 days	18 Sep 2003	19	Disc.: LINEAR	MPC · JPL
0	2003 SK5	AMO	20.0	360 m	multiple	2003–2012	24 Apr 2012	190	Disc.: NEAT	MPC · JPL
1	2003 SL5	AMO	19.2	510 m	multiple	2003–2012	26 Apr 2012	183	Disc.: LINEAR	MPC · JPL
0	2003 SM5	MBA-I	19.27	420 m	multiple	2003–2021	30 Nov 2021	58	Disc.: Spacewatch	MPC · JPL
2	2003 SO5	MBA-O	18.3	1.2 km	multiple	2003–2019	02 Oct 2019	47	Disc.: Spacewatch	MPC · JPL
–	2003 SS6	MCA	20.5	240 m	single	4 days	21 Sep 2003	15	Disc.: Spacewatch	MPC · JPL
1	2003 SN7	MBA-M	18.4	880 m	multiple	2003–2020	23 Jul 2020	34	Disc.: LPL/Spacewatch II; Added on 17 January 2021	MPC · JPL
0	2003 SC9 = (887221)	MBA-M	18.2	960 m	multiple	2003–2020	05 Nov 2020	53	Disc.: LPL/Spacewatch II	MPC · JPL
1	2003 ST9	MBA-M	18.49	600 m	multiple	2003–2020	01 Aug 2020	18	Disc.: LPL/Spacewatch II	MPC · JPL
0	2003 SX9	MBA-M	18.4	620 m	multiple	1999–2020	10 Dec 2020	37	Disc.: Spacewatch; Alt.: 2019 JG17	MPC · JPL
2	2003 SJ11	MCA	19.58	610 m	multiple	2003-2026	20 Sep 2026	28	Disc.: NEAT	MPC · JPL
0	2003 SC15	MCA	18.6	570 m	multiple	2003–2019	05 Oct 2019	85	Disc.: Spacewatch; Alt.: 2016 TJ31	MPC · JPL
0	2003 SF16	MBA-I	18.96	620 m	multiple	2003-2024	02 Dec 2024 = (615452)	49	Disc.: LPL/Spacewatch II	MPC · JPL
0	2003 SS16 = (887222)	MBA-O	17.83	1.5 km	multiple	2003–2021	10 Feb 2021	35	Disc.: Spacewatch; Added on 9 March 2021; Alt.: 2019 RY24	MPC · JPL
0	2003 SO17	HUN	19.0	470 m	multiple	2003–2021	29 May 2021	38	Disc.: Spacewatch	MPC · JPL
1	2003 SY17	APO	18.1	850 m	multiple	2000–2012	12 Sep 2012	70	Disc.: LPL/Spacewatch II; NEO larger than 1 kilometer	MPC · JPL
3	2003 SZ17	MCA	20.03	280 m	multiple	2003-2015	23 May 2015	53	Disc.: NEAT	MPC · JPL
1	2003 SF18	MBA-M	19.0	670 m	multiple	2003–2020	14 Aug 2020	35	Disc.: LPL/Spacewatch II	MPC · JPL
0	2003 SW18 = (887223)	MBA-M	18.0	1.1 km	multiple	2003–2020	08 Sep 2020	63	Disc.: Spacewatch	MPC · JPL
0	2003 SH19	MBA-I	18.98	480 m	multiple	2003–2021	07 Nov 2021	88	Disc.: Spacewatch	MPC · JPL
0	2003 SJ19	MBA-M	18.3	920 m	multiple	2003–2020	11 Nov 2020	39	Disc.: Spacewatch	MPC · JPL
2	2003 SL19	MBA-I	19.0	470 m	multiple	2003–2020	07 Dec 2020	32	Disc.: Spacewatch; Added on 9 March 2021; Alt.: 2020 RJ43	MPC · JPL
0	2003 SF20	MBA-M	18.12	1.3 km	multiple	2003–2021	08 Sep 2021	75	Disc.: LPL/Spacewatch II	MPC · JPL
0	2003 SL20	MBA-I	19.2	430 m	multiple	2003–2020	14 Sep 2020	31	Disc.: LPL/Spacewatch II; Added on 19 October 2020	MPC · JPL
0	2003 SS20	MBA-I	19.1	450 m	multiple	2003–2019	28 May 2019	32	Disc.: Spacewatch; Added on 17 January 2021	MPC · JPL
1	2003 SW20	MBA-M	18.6	800 m	multiple	2003–2020	16 Sep 2020	31	Disc.: LPL/Spacewatch II; Added on 19 October 2020	MPC · JPL
1	2003 SX21	MBA-I	18.8	520 m	multiple	2003–2021	29 Aug 2021	33	Disc.: LPL/Spacewatch II; Added on 30 September 2021; Alt.: 2021 NC36	MPC · JPL
0	2003 SB23	MCA	18.4	620 m	multiple	2003–2020	14 May 2020	52	Disc.: NEAT	MPC · JPL
1	2003 SA24	MBA-I	19.40	390 m	multiple	2003–2021	29 Oct 2021	40	Disc.: NEAT	MPC · JPL
0	2003 SD24	MBA-I	19.0	470 m	multiple	2003–2016	03 Jan 2016	33	Disc.: LPL/Spacewatch II; Alt.: 2007 UE13	MPC · JPL
0	2003 SH24	MBA-I	18.5	590 m	multiple	2003–2018	09 Nov 2018	49	Disc.: NEAT	MPC · JPL
2	2003 SH27	MBA-M	18.1	1.0 km	multiple	2003–2012	03 Nov 2012	30	Disc.: LINEAR	MPC · JPL
2	2003 SJ35	MCA	18.7	540 m	multiple	2003–2007	17 Nov 2007	46	Disc.: NEAT; Alt.: 2007 TJ64	MPC · JPL
6	2003 SK36	AMO	21.7	160 m	single	36 days	25 Oct 2003	34	Disc.: NEAT	MPC · JPL
8	2003 SL36	APO	26.4	19 m	single	8 days	26 Sep 2003	27	Disc.: LONEOS	MPC · JPL
0	2003 SG48	MBA-M	18.05	1.3 km	multiple	2003-2023	15 Jan 2023	86	Disc.: NEAT	MPC · JPL
0	2003 SZ48	MBA-M	17.9	780 m	multiple	2003–2020	10 Dec 2020	48	Disc.: NEAT	MPC · JPL
1	2003 SP53	MBA-O	17.1	2.1 km	multiple	2003–2020	13 Sep 2020	41	Disc.: Spacewatch	MPC · JPL
0	2003 SQ53	MBA-M	17.9	780 m	multiple	2003–2020	07 Dec 2020	31	Disc.: Spacewatch; Added on 11 May 2021; Alt.: 2020 TG45	MPC · JPL
0	2003 SR53 = (887224)	MBA-M	17.9	1.1 km	multiple	2003–2020	14 Nov 2020	80	Disc.: Spacewatch	MPC · JPL
0	2003 SP54	MBA-M	17.8	1.5 km	multiple	2003–2017	16 Dec 2017	80	Disc.: LONEOS; Alt.: 2008 WX69	MPC · JPL
0	2003 SE55	MBA-M	17.52	1.7 km	multiple	2003–2021	31 Oct 2021	103	Disc.: LONEOS	MPC · JPL
2	2003 SK56	MCA	18.9	490 m	multiple	2003–2019	03 Jul 2019	35	Disc.: LONEOS	MPC · JPL
2	2003 SN56	MBA-I	17.8	820 m	multiple	2003–2016	03 Jan 2016	42	Disc.: LONEOS; Alt.: 2003 SN307, 2011 WS62	MPC · JPL
0	2003 SK63	MBA-M	18.8	730 m	multiple	2003–2020	14 Oct 2020	32	Disc.: Spacewatch; Added on 11 May 2021; Alt.: 2016 WM32	MPC · JPL
0	2003 SQ63	MBA-M	17.97	1.1 km	multiple	2003–2021	27 Nov 2021	36	Disc.: Spacewatch; Added on 19 October 2020	MPC · JPL
0	2003 SL68	MBA-M	18.5	650 m	multiple	2003-2024	26 Dec 2024	62	Disc.: Spacewatch	MPC · JPL6
–	2003 SM68	MCA	19.9	310 m	single	36 days	23 Oct 2003	14	Disc.: Spacewatch	MPC · JPL
0	2003 SV68	MBA-M	18.96	900 m	multiple	2003–2021	04 Oct 2021	49	Disc.: Spacewatch; Alt.: 2003 SF366	MPC · JPL
1	2003 SM72	MBA-I	19.1	450 m	multiple	2003–2020	11 Oct 2020	53	Disc.: LPL/Spacewatch II	MPC · JPL
0	2003 SO72	MBA-I	18.94	480 m	multiple	2003–2021	03 Oct 2021	58	Disc.: LPL/Spacewatch II; Alt.: 2014 TW60	MPC · JPL
1	2003 SR72	HIL	16.98	2.2 km	multiple	2003–2019	25 Nov 2019	41	Disc.: LPL/Spacewatch II	MPC · JPL
0	2003 SB73	MBA-I	17.9	780 m	multiple	2003–2018	10 Mar 2018	46	Disc.: Spacewatch	MPC · JPL
3	2003 SH74	MBA-I	18.8	520 m	multiple	2003–2014	17 Oct 2014	25	Disc.: Spacewatch; Alt.: 2014 QF18	MPC · JPL
0	2003 SX74	MBA-I	19.4	390 m	multiple	2003–2020	07 Dec 2020	35	Disc.: Spacewatch	MPC · JPL
0	2003 SD75	MCA	20.62	220 m	multiple	2003–2019	03 Dec 2019	58	Disc.: Spacewatch	MPC · JPL
6	2003 SH84	AMO	23.1	85 m	single	93 days	21 Dec 2003	32	Disc.: Spacewatch	MPC · JPL
0	2003 SN84	MCA	18.0	750 m	multiple	2003–2021	10 Feb 2021	47	Disc.: LINEAR; Alt.: 2021 BV9	MPC · JPL
5	2003 SR84	APO	26.0	22 m	single	7 days	27 Sep 2003	281	Disc.: NEAT	MPC · JPL
0	2003 SS84	APO	21.8	160 m	multiple	2003–2020	22 Mar 2020	255	Disc.: LINEAR; Potentially hazardous object	MPC · JPL
0	2003 SU84	APO	22.18	140 m	multiple	2003–2025	02 Mar 2025	62	Disc.: LINEAR	MPC · JPL
0	2003 SW84	MCA	19.43	390 m	multiple	2003–2022	25 Jan 2022	136	Disc.: NEAT	MPC · JPL
6	2003 SA85	AMO	21.6	170 m	single	37 days	28 Oct 2003	138	Disc.: NEAT	MPC · JPL
1	2003 SB85	MCA	18.3	920 m	multiple	2003–2017	18 Mar 2017	157	Disc.: LINEAR	MPC · JPL
0	2003 SD90	MBA-M	17.4	980 m	multiple	2003–2021	03 Jan 2021	50	Disc.: NEAT	MPC · JPL
2	2003 SK91	MBA-I	18.3	650 m	multiple	2003–2014	26 Nov 2014	96	Disc.: NEAT; Alt.: 2014 RF45	MPC · JPL
0	2003 SM91	MBA-I	19.23	420 m	multiple	2003–2021	29 Nov 2021	36	Disc.: NEAT	MPC · JPL
0	2003 SV94	MBA-O	17.24	2.7 km	multiple	2003–2021	30 Nov 2021	64	Disc.: Spacewatch; Alt.: 2010 BW59	MPC · JPL
–	2003 SM96	MBA-I	18.8	520 m	single	30 days	19 Oct 2003	10	Disc.: Spacewatch	MPC · JPL
–	2003 SV100	MBA-M	20.9	200 m	single	2 days	22 Sep 2003	9	Disc.: LPL/Spacewatch II	MPC · JPL
1	2003 SD109	MBA-M	17.94	1.4 km	multiple	2003–2021	04 Oct 2021	43	Disc.: LPL/Spacewatch II	MPC · JPL
0	2003 SK111	MBA-O	17.97	1.6 km	multiple	2003-2025	03 Jan 2025	105	Disc.: NEAT	MPC · JPL
1	2003 SH113	MBA-I	18.7	540 m	multiple	2003–2018	15 Nov 2018	23	Disc.: Spacewatch; Added on 21 August 2021; Alt.: 2014 SY296	MPC · JPL
0	2003 SL113	MBA-M	18.19	1.3 km	multiple	2003–2021	31 Aug 2021	45	Disc.: Spacewatch	MPC · JPL
4	2003 SM114	MBA-M	19.1	670 m	multiple	2003-2021	30 Oct 2021	23	Disc.: Spacewatch	MPC · JPL
–	2003 SS114	MBA-I	20.2	270 m	single	6 days	22 Sep 2003	9	Disc.: LPL/Spacewatch II	MPC · JPL
1	2003 SM115	MBA-I	18.80	520 m	multiple	2003–2021	09 Nov 2021	51	Disc.: LPL/Spacewatch II; Added on 5 November 2021	MPC · JPL
1	2003 SS115	MBA-I	18.6	570 m	multiple	2003–2021	02 Oct 2021	33	Disc.: Spacewatch; Added on 5 November 2021; Alt.: 2021 PT101	MPC · JPL
1	2003 SR116	MBA-O	17.7	1.6 km	multiple	1998–2018	10 Oct 2018	28	Disc.: Spacewatch	MPC · JPL
0	2003 SM118	MBA-I	18.58	570 m	multiple	2003–2021	03 Sep 2021	44	Disc.: LPL/Spacewatch II	MPC · JPL
0	2003 SK120	MBA-M	17.5	1.8 km	multiple	2003–2017	21 Nov 2017	44	Disc.: Spacewatch	MPC · JPL
2	2003 ST122	MBA-I	18.2	680 m	multiple	2003–2020	11 Oct 2020	53	Disc.: Spacewatch; Added on 19 October 2020; Alt.: 2010 ON7	MPC · JPL
1	2003 SW122	MBA-M	19.15	820 m	multiple	2003–2021	29 Nov 2021	43	Disc.: Spacewatch; Alt.: 2012 UC132	MPC · JPL
1	2003 SS124	MBA-M	18.18	1.3 km	multiple	2003–2021	28 Nov 2021	37	Disc.: LPL/Spacewatch II; Alt.: 2012 TW280	MPC · JPL
0	2003 SB125	MBA-I	19.0	470 m	multiple	2003–2019	27 Nov 2019	104	Disc.: Spacewatch	MPC · JPL
0	2003 SC125	MBA-O	17.4	1.8 km	multiple	2003–2020	08 Oct 2020	37	Disc.: Spacewatch; Added on 17 January 2021	MPC · JPL
–	2003 SD125	MBA-M	17.8	1.5 km	single	2 days	21 Sep 2003	11	Disc.: VATT	MPC · JPL
5	2003 SE125	MBA-O	16.44	2.2 km	multiple	2003-2025	24 Jul 2025	15	Disc.: VATT	MPC · JPL
3	2003 SE126	MBA-M	19.4	550 m	multiple	2003–2020	14 Oct 2020	21	Disc.: VATT	MPC · JPL
1	2003 ST126	MBA-M	18.69	740 m	multiple	2003-2024	07 Sep 2024	38	Disc.: KLENOT; Alt.: 2020 T0103	MPC · JPL
1	2003 SA127	MBA-M	18.1	1.0 km	multiple	2003–2016	26 Oct 2016	41	Disc.: Piszkéstető Stn.	MPC · JPL
7	2003 SW130	ATE	29.1	5 m	single	8 days	28 Sep 2003	24	Disc.: LPL/Spacewatch II	MPC · JPL
0	2003 SA131	MBA-O	17.7	1.6 km	multiple	2003–2019	31 Oct 2019	53	Disc.: NEAT	MPC · JPL
1	2003 SA132	MBA-O	17.2	2.0 km	multiple	2003–2020	11 Oct 2020	46	Disc.: LPL/Spacewatch II; Added on 30 September 2021; Alt.: 2014 OJ438	MPC · JPL
1	2003 SM135	MBA-I	18.7	540 m	multiple	2003–2019	03 Apr 2019	29	Disc.: Spacewatch	MPC · JPL
1	2003 SO135	MBA-I	19.63	270 m	multiple	2003-2023	20 Sep 2023	33	Disc.: LPL/Spacewatch II	MPC · JPL
0	2003 SZ136	MBA-M	17.8	1.5 km	multiple	2003–2017	27 Oct 2017	39	Disc.: Spacewatch	MPC · JPL
0	2003 SS140	MCA	18.3	650 m	multiple	2003–2019	01 Aug 2019	77	Disc.: NEAT	MPC · JPL
0	2003 SS152	MBA-M	17.9	1.1 km	multiple	2003–2020	17 Nov 2020	63	Disc.: LONEOS; Added on 17 January 2021	MPC · JPL
0	2003 SD158	MBA-I	19.34	330 m	multiple	2003-2023	05 Nov 2023	57	Disc.: Piszkéstető Stn.	MPC · JPL
6	2003 SV159	AMO	22.9	93 m	single	32 days	24 Oct 2003	87	Disc.: LINEAR	MPC · JPL
0	2003 SN161	MCA	18.81	510 m	multiple	1999–2019	27 Sep 2019	55	Disc.: Spacewatch; Alt.: 2016 SW11	MPC · JPL
0	2003 SY163	MBA-M	18.01	1.4 km	multiple	2003–2021	27 Oct 2021	85	Disc.: LONEOS	MPC · JPL
2	2003 SL166	MBA-M	18.88	450 m	multiple	2003-2024	05 Dec 2024	33	Disc.: Spacewatch	MPC · JPL
0	2003 SE170	MCA	19.9	310 m	multiple	2003–2019	03 Nov 2019	57	Disc.: NEAT; Alt.: 2007 RZ199	MPC · JPL
0	2003 SF170	AMO	19.4	470 m	multiple	2003–2019	03 Apr 2019	64	Disc.: NEAT	MPC · JPL
0	2003 SH170	MCA	18.87	760 m	multiple	2003-2024	19 Dec 2024	131	Disc.: NEAT	MPC · JPL
1	2003 SJ170	AMO	19.6	430 m	multiple	2003–2007	05 Oct 2007	102	Disc.: LINEAR	MPC · JPL
2	2003 SE175	MCA	19.79	360 m	multiple	2003-2021	28 Nov 2021	35	Disc.: Spacewatch	MPC · JPL
0	2003 SF177	MBA-M	18.1	1.0 km	multiple	2003–2020	17 Nov 2020	75	Disc.: NEAT	MPC · JPL
2	2003 SD180	MBA-O	18.1	1.3 km	multiple	2003–2019	28 Nov 2019	74	Disc.: Spacewatch	MPC · JPL
0	2003 SE180	MBA-O	18.1	1.3 km	multiple	2003–2018	08 Nov 2018	53	Disc.: Spacewatch	MPC · JPL
0	2003 SQ182	MBA-M	17.5	1.8 km	multiple	2003–2020	27 Apr 2020	87	Disc.: CINEOS	MPC · JPL
0	2003 SF185	MBA-M	18.4	880 m	multiple	2003–2020	16 Nov 2020	69	Disc.: AMOS; Alt.: 2020 QA21	MPC · JPL
1	2003 SX185	MBA-M	18.70	760 m	multiple	2003–2021	29 Nov 2021	30	Disc.: LONEOS	MPC · JPL
0	2003 SS186	MCA	19.0	470 m	multiple	2003–2021	05 Jan 2021	55	Disc.: LONEOS	MPC · JPL
2	2003 SL187	MBA-M	18.06	680 m	multiple	2003-2024	23 Dec 2024	34	Disc.: LONEOS; Alt.: 2024 XK22	MPC · JPL
0	2003 SR191 = (887225)	MBA-M	17.5	1.8 km	multiple	2003–2017	23 Oct 2017	46	Disc.: Spacewatch	MPC · JPL
0	2003 SL205	MBA-I	18.7	1.0 km	multiple	2003–2020	16 May 2020	91	Disc.: AMOS	MPC · JPL
0	2003 SH206	MBA-M	18.26	1.2 km	multiple	2003–2021	09 Sep 2021	47	Disc.: NEAT	MPC · JPL
0	2003 SL214	MCA	18.9	490 m	multiple	2003–2016	05 Dec 2016	91	Disc.: Desert Eagle Obs.	MPC · JPL
5	2003 SN214	APO	22.7	100 m	single	34 days	25 Oct 2003	18	Disc.: Spacewatch	MPC · JPL
3	2003 SO214	MCA	19.4	390 m	multiple	2003–2010	13 Dec 2010	38	Disc.: NEAT	MPC · JPL
0	2003 SP214	MCA	19.35	370 m	multiple	2003-2025	27 Nov 2025	99	Disc.: NEAT	MPC · JPL
0	2003 SS214	AMO	20.0	856 m	multiple	2003–2015	21 Jan 2015	121	Disc.: Črni Vrh Obs.	MPC · JPL
0	2003 SU214	AMO	19.23	590 m	multiple	2003–2025	28 Feb 2025	217	Disc.: LINEAR	MPC · JPL
8	2003 SH215	AMO	24.9	37 m	single	6 days	30 Sep 2003	23	Disc.: Paranal Obs.	MPC · JPL
7	2003 SK215	AMO	21.5	180 m	single	32 days	30 Oct 2003	30	Disc.: LINEAR	MPC · JPL
0	2003 SL215	AMO	20.66	260 m	multiple	2003–2021	29 Nov 2021	82	Disc.: LONEOS	MPC · JPL
6	2003 SM215	APO	27.5	11 m	single	2 days	30 Sep 2003	27	Disc.: LINEAR	MPC · JPL
5	2003 SN215	AMO	22.4	120 m	single	81 days	18 Dec 2003	28	Disc.: Spacewatch	MPC · JPL
0	2003 SV216	MBA-M	18.2	960 m	multiple	2003–2020	23 Nov 2020	32	Disc.: Sierra Nevada Obs. Added on 17 January 2021	MPC · JPL
2	2003 SR221	MBA-M	18.94	430 m	multiple	2003-2025	07 Sep 2025	26	Disc.: Spacewatch	MPC · JPL
0	2003 ST221	MCA	20.28	260 m	multiple	2003–2021	07 Nov 2021	59	Disc.: Spacewatch; Alt.: 2018 FH4	MPC · JPL
–	2003 SU221	MCA	20.2	270 m	single	21 days	20 Oct 2003	15	Disc.: Spacewatch	MPC · JPL
7	2003 SQ222	APO	30.1	3 m	single	4 days	02 Oct 2003	17	Disc.: LONEOS	MPC · JPL
0	2003 ST222	HUN	19.45	380 m	multiple	2003–2019	08 May 2019	25	Disc.: Spacewatch	MPC · JPL
0	2003 SZ226	MBA-O	17.7	1.6 km	multiple	2003–2020	23 Dec 2020	35	Disc.: Spacewatch	MPC · JPL
2	2003 SA229	MBA-I	19.3	410 m	multiple	2003–2019	04 Jul 2019	46	Disc.: LPL/Spacewatch II	MPC · JPL
0	2003 SR229	MBA-M	18.6	800 m	multiple	2002–2020	10 Nov 2020	32	Disc.: Spacewatch; Added on 22 July 2020	MPC · JPL
0	2003 SX232	MBA-M	17.2	2.0 km	multiple	2002–2017	14 Nov 2017	72	Disc.: NEAT	MPC · JPL
0	2003 ST239	MBA-O	17.76	1.6 km	multiple	2003–2021	29 Nov 2021	39	Disc.: LPL/Spacewatch II; Added on 21 August 2021	MPC · JPL
0	2003 SV239	MCA	19.74	250 m	multiple	2003-2022	23 Oct 2022	39	Disc.: LPL/Spacewatch II	MPC · JPL
0	2003 SL240	MBA-I	19.35	400 m	multiple	2003–2021	07 Sep 2021	39	Disc.: Spacewatch; Alt.: 2014 UP65	MPC · JPL
2	2003 SO240	MBA-I	18.7	540 m	multiple	2003–2014	23 Sep 2014	23	Disc.: Spacewatch	MPC · JPL
1	2003 SM241	MBA-O	18.2	1.3 km	multiple	2003–2020	10 Dec 2020	43	Disc.: Spacewatch	MPC · JPL
0	2003 SW241	MBA-I	19.3	410 m	multiple	2003–2020	11 Jul 2020	40	Disc.: LPL/Spacewatch II; Added on 22 July 2020	MPC · JPL
0	2003 SC242	MBA-M	18.07	1.4 km	multiple	2003–2021	04 Oct 2021	56	Disc.: LPL/Spacewatch II; Added on 22 July 2020	MPC · JPL
0	2003 SG242	MBA-M	18.4	880 m	multiple	2003–2021	04 Jan 2021	54	Disc.: Spacewatch; Added on 17 January 2021	MPC · JPL
2	2003 SJ243	MBA-M	18.3	1.2 km	multiple	2003–2017	28 Sep 2017	27	Disc.: LPL/Spacewatch II; Alt.: 2017 QV83	MPC · JPL
4	2003 SM243	MBA-I	19.69	360 m	multiple	2003-2014	25 Sep 2014	25	Disc.: LPL/Spacewatch II; Alt.: 2014 SD236	MPC · JPL
2	2003 SN243	MCA	19.4	390 m	multiple	2003–2021	08 May 2021	34	Disc.: LPL/Spacewatch II	MPC · JPL
1	2003 SQ243	MBA-I	19.9	310 m	multiple	2003–2020	22 Aug 2020	24	Disc.: LPL/Spacewatch II; Added on 11 May 2021; Alt.: 2020 MA30	MPC · JPL
2	2003 SU243	MBA-O	18.26	1.2 km	multiple	2003-2023	18 Nov 2023	29	Disc.: LPL/Spacewatch II	MPC · JPL
1	2003 SY243	MCA	20.1	280 m	multiple	2003–2019	25 Sep 2019	45	Disc.: LPL/Spacewatch II	MPC · JPL
0	2003 SW247	MCA	18.6	570 m	multiple	2003–2019	23 Oct 2019	74	Disc.: LINEAR; Alt.: 2016 SG23	MPC · JPL
1	2003 SG254	MBA-M	19.67	370 m	multiple	2003 -2024	18 Nov 2024	69	Disc.: LPL/Spacewatch II	MPC · JPL
1	2003 SJ255	MBA-M	19.09	850 m	multiple	2003–2021	08 Nov 2021	53	Disc.: LPL/Spacewatch II; Added on 21 August 2021	MPC · JPL
0	2003 SP256	MBA-M	18.23	950 m	multiple	2003–2022	07 Jan 2022	60	Disc.: LPL/Spacewatch II	MPC · JPL
2	2003 SG262	MBA-I	18.8	520 m	multiple	2003–2018	17 Nov 2018	57	Disc.: Spacewatch	MPC · JPL
2	2003 SD263	MBA-M	18.66	570 m	multiple	20002-2024	21 Dec 2024	30	Disc.: LINEAR; Alt.: 2024 WM79	MPC · JPL
1	2003 SE265	MBA-M	18.4	620 m	multiple	2003–2020	06 Dec 2020	35	Disc.: Spacewatch; Added on 17 January 2021	MPC · JPL
0	2003 SG265	HUN	18.99	470 m	multiple	2002–2021	27 Nov 2021	28	Disc.: Spacewatch; Added on 21 August 2021	MPC · JPL
2	2003 SR265	MBA-M	19.0	390 m	multiple	2003-2015	26 Jul 2015	25	Disc.: Spacewatch	MPC · JPL
1	2003 ST265	MBA-M	18.10	1.3 km	multiple	2003–2021	26 Oct 2021	64	Disc.: Spacewatch	MPC · JPL
4	2003 SX265	MBA-M	18.7	1.0 km	multiple	2003–2017	22 Nov 2017	22	Disc.: LPL/Spacewatch II	MPC · JPL
0	2003 SX266	MBA-I	18.3	650 m	multiple	2003–2021	17 Jan 2021	37	Disc.: LINEAR	MPC · JPL
2	2003 SV267	MBA-M	18.61	1.1 km	multiple	2003–2021	28 Sep 2021	34	Disc.: Spacewatch; Added on 30 September 2021	MPC · JPL
0	2003 SR268	MBA-O	17.8	1.5 km	multiple	1998–2021	08 Jun 2021	26	Disc.: LPL/Spacewatch II; Added on 19 October 2020	MPC · JPL
0	2003 SS268	MBA-I	18.7	540 m	multiple	2003–2018	12 Sep 2018	26	Disc.: LPL/Spacewatch II	MPC · JPL
0	2003 SX268 = (887226)	MBA-M	18.0	1.1 km	multiple	2003–2020	14 Oct 2020	25	Disc.: LPL/Spacewatch II; Added on 17 January 2021	MPC · JPL

back to top
