= List of unnumbered minor planets: 2003 S (443–619) =

This is a partial list of unnumbered minor planets for principal provisional designations assigned during 16–30 September 2003. Since this period yielded a high number of provisional discoveries, it is further split into several standalone pages. As of April 2026, a total of 130 bodies remain unnumbered for this period. Objects for this year are listed on the following pages: A–E · F–G · H–L · M–R · S_{i} · S_{ii} · S_{iii} · S_{iv} · T · U_{i} · U_{ii} · U_{iii} · U_{iv} · V · W_{i} · W_{ii} and X–Y. Also see previous and next year.

Near-Earth obj.	MBA (inner)	MBA (outer)	Centaur
Mars-crosser	MBA (middle)	Jupiter trojan	Trans-Neptunian obj.
Unclassified

== S ==
U	Designation	Class	Physical		Observations				Description and notes	Ref
U	Designation	Class	H	D	Opp.	Arc	Last	Used	Description and notes	Ref
0	2003 SP443	MBA-I	18.1	710 m	multiple	2003–2018	05 Oct 2018	43	Disc.: Spacewatch	MPC · JPL
0	2003 SK444	MBA-I	18.4	620 m	multiple	2003–2017	24 Oct 2017	52	Disc.: Spacewatch; Alt.: 2010 NA142	MPC · JPL
0	2003 SE445	MBA-I	18.4	620 m	multiple	2003–2018	07 Mar 2018	39	Disc.: Spacewatch	MPC · JPL
0	2003 SO445	MBA-M	18.03	1.4 km	multiple	2003–2021	28 Sep 2021	50	Disc.: Spacewatch	MPC · JPL
0	2003 ST445	MBA-I	18.5	590 m	multiple	2003–2017	20 Nov 2017	43	Disc.: Spacewatch	MPC · JPL
1	2003 SD446	MBA-I	18.4	620 m	multiple	2003–2017	24 Oct 2017	40	Disc.: Spacewatch	MPC · JPL
0	2003 SF446	MBA-I	18.1	710 m	multiple	2003–2015	08 Dec 2015	39	Disc.: Spacewatch	MPC · JPL
0	2003 SR446	MBA-I	18.7	540 m	multiple	2003–2020	12 Dec 2020	39	Disc.: Spacewatch	MPC · JPL
0	2003 SB447	MBA-M	18.5	840 m	multiple	2003–2020	17 Jul 2020	39	Disc.: Spacewatch	MPC · JPL
0	2003 SH447	MBA-I	18.99	470 m	multiple	2003–2021	09 Dec 2021	74	Disc.: Spacewatch	MPC · JPL
0	2003 SK447 = (887237)	MBA-O	17.4	1.8 km	multiple	2003–2017	11 Aug 2017	33	Disc.: Spacewatch	MPC · JPL
0	2003 SL447	MBA-O	17.24	2.0 km	multiple	2003–2022	27 Jan 2022	93	Disc.: NEAT; Alt.: 2010 CY186	MPC · JPL
0	2003 SO447	MBA-I	19.0	470 m	multiple	2003–2021	18 Jan 2021	34	Disc.: Spacewatch	MPC · JPL
0	2003 ST447	MBA-M	18.44	860 m	multiple	2003–2022	26 Jan 2022	55	Disc.: NEAT	MPC · JPL
0	2003 SV447	MBA-I	19.3	410 m	multiple	2003–2016	04 Oct 2016	35	Disc.: LPL/Spacewatch II	MPC · JPL
1	2003 SA448	MCA	19.6	360 m	multiple	2003–2019	24 Apr 2019	29	Disc.: SDSS	MPC · JPL
1	2003 SD448	MBA-M	19.2	430 m	multiple	2003–2015	10 Oct 2015	28	Disc.: Spacewatch	MPC · JPL
1	2003 SF448	MBA-M	18.6	570 m	multiple	2003–2019	01 Nov 2019	61	Disc.: Spacewatch	MPC · JPL
2	2003 SJ448	MBA-M	19.3	410 m	multiple	2003–2019	24 Aug 2019	35	Disc.: Spacewatch	MPC · JPL
0	2003 SL448	MBA-M	18.3	650 m	multiple	2003–2020	11 Dec 2020	29	Disc.: Spacewatch	MPC · JPL
0	2003 SW448	MBA-I	19.2	430 m	multiple	2003–2019	01 Nov 2019	62	Disc.: Spacewatch	MPC · JPL
0	2003 SX448	MBA-M	18.98	890 m	multiple	2003–2021	02 Oct 2021	46	Disc.: Spacewatch	MPC · JPL
3	2003 SY448	MBA-M	18.0	1.1 km	multiple	2003–2016	12 Sep 2016	26	Disc.: NEAT	MPC · JPL
0	2003 SB449	MBA-M	18.41	1.2 km	multiple	2003–2021	09 Nov 2021	63	Disc.: SDSS	MPC · JPL
2	2003 SG449	MBA-M	18.4	880 m	multiple	2003–2016	08 Sep 2016	22	Disc.: NEAT	MPC · JPL
0	2003 SH449 = (887238)	MBA-I	19.19	430 m	multiple	2003–2021	04 Oct 2021	65	Disc.: Spacewatch	MPC · JPL
1	2003 SL449	MBA-I	20.2	270 m	multiple	2003–2017	21 Sep 2017	20	Disc.: Spacewatch	MPC · JPL
1	2003 SM449	MBA-I	19.3	410 m	multiple	2003–2021	18 Jan 2021	31	Disc.: Spacewatch	MPC · JPL
0	2003 SO449	MBA-M	18.02	1.4 km	multiple	2003–2021	29 Aug 2021	35	Disc.: Spacewatch	MPC · JPL
1	2003 SP449	MBA-O	17.6	1.7 km	multiple	2003–2014	27 Sep 2014	17	Disc.: LPL/Spacewatch II	MPC · JPL
3	2003 SR449	MBA-I	19.1	450 m	multiple	2003–2017	14 Sep 2017	28	Disc.: Spacewatch	MPC · JPL
0	2003 ST449	MBA-M	18.5	840 m	multiple	2003–2020	05 Nov 2020	58	Disc.: Spacewatch	MPC · JPL
0	2003 SO451	MBA-I	18.9	490 m	multiple	2003–2019	03 Jun 2019	57	Disc.: Spacewatch	MPC · JPL
0	2003 SP452	MBA-I	19.28	410 m	multiple	2003–2019	24 Jul 2019	43	Disc.: Spacewatch	MPC · JPL
0	2003 SR452	MBA-I	18.8	520 m	multiple	2003–2019	20 Dec 2019	61	Disc.: NEAT	MPC · JPL
0	2003 SY452	MCA	18.9	490 m	multiple	2003–2019	01 Jul 2019	57	Disc.: Spacewatch	MPC · JPL
1	2003 SL453 = (887239)	MBA-M	18.5	590 m	multiple	2003–2019	03 Oct 2019	41	Disc.: SDSS	MPC · JPL
0	2003 ST453	HIL	16.5	2.8 km	multiple	2003–2019	19 Nov 2019	45	Disc.: Spacewatch	MPC · JPL
0	2003 SU453	HIL	16.5	2.8 km	multiple	1995–2019	19 Nov 2019	50	Disc.: Spacewatch	MPC · JPL
1	2003 SX453	MBA-I	18.9	490 m	multiple	2003–2019	04 Dec 2019	58	Disc.: Spacewatch	MPC · JPL
0	2003 SQ454	MBA-O	17.4	1.8 km	multiple	2003–2019	19 Nov 2019	53	Disc.: Spacewatch	MPC · JPL
0	2003 SR454	MBA-O	17.8	1.5 km	multiple	2003–2019	25 Sep 2019	38	Disc.: LPL/Spacewatch II	MPC · JPL
0	2003 SS454	MBA-I	18.9	490 m	multiple	2003–2019	06 Sep 2019	43	Disc.: Spacewatch	MPC · JPL
0	2003 SU454	MBA-I	19.3	410 m	multiple	2003–2019	01 Nov 2019	39	Disc.: LONEOS	MPC · JPL
1	2003 SV454	MBA-I	19.0	470 m	multiple	2003–2018	11 Nov 2018	45	Disc.: Spacewatch	MPC · JPL
1	2003 SZ454	MBA-M	18.6	570 m	multiple	2003–2019	25 Sep 2019	34	Disc.: Spacewatch	MPC · JPL
1	2003 SB455	MBA-O	17.9	1.5 km	multiple	2003–2020	25 Jan 2020	39	Disc.: Spacewatch	MPC · JPL
0	2003 SF455	MBA-I	19.5	370 m	multiple	2003–2019	03 Oct 2019	36	Disc.: Spacewatch	MPC · JPL
0	2003 SH455 = (887240)	MBA-I	18.4	620 m	multiple	2003–2020	22 Apr 2020	47	Disc.: Spacewatch	MPC · JPL
1	2003 SJ455	MBA-I	18.6	570 m	multiple	2003–2018	13 Nov 2018	40	Disc.: Spacewatch	MPC · JPL
1	2003 SL455	MBA-M	18.3	650 m	multiple	2003–2019	01 Nov 2019	34	Disc.: SDSS	MPC · JPL
0	2003 SM455 = (887241)	MBA-O	17.3	1.9 km	multiple	2003–2021	15 Jan 2021	46	Disc.: Spacewatch	MPC · JPL
0	2003 SV455	MBA-I	18.5	590 m	multiple	2003–2020	23 Aug 2020	41	Disc.: Spacewatch	MPC · JPL
0	2003 SW455	MBA-I	19.2	430 m	multiple	2003–2018	15 Oct 2018	33	Disc.: Spacewatch	MPC · JPL
0	2003 SX455	MBA-O	16.9	2.3 km	multiple	2003–2019	01 Oct 2019	37	Disc.: Spacewatch	MPC · JPL
0	2003 SA456 = (887242)	HUN	18.7	540 m	multiple	2003–2019	25 Oct 2019	37	Disc.: Spacewatch	MPC · JPL
0	2003 SB456	MBA-M	17.3	1.9 km	multiple	2003–2017	21 Oct 2017	34	Disc.: Spacewatch	MPC · JPL
1	2003 SD456	MBA-I	18.4	620 m	multiple	2003–2018	08 Nov 2018	30	Disc.: Spacewatch	MPC · JPL
0	2003 SG456	MBA-O	17.4	1.8 km	multiple	2003–2019	01 Nov 2019	29	Disc.: Spacewatch	MPC · JPL
2	2003 SH456	HIL	16.6	2.7 km	multiple	2003–2019	02 Nov 2019	36	Disc.: SDSS	MPC · JPL
1	2003 SK456	MBA-M	18.8	520 m	multiple	2003–2019	02 Oct 2019	41	Disc.: Spacewatch	MPC · JPL
0	2003 SM456	MBA-I	18.66	550 m	multiple	2003–2021	08 May 2021	42	Disc.: Spacewatch	MPC · JPL
0	2003 SN456	MBA-I	19.0	470 m	multiple	2003–2020	25 Oct 2020	31	Disc.: Spacewatch	MPC · JPL
1	2003 SU456	HIL	16.8	2.4 km	multiple	1995–2020	19 Jan 2020	38	Disc.: Spacewatch	MPC · JPL
0	2003 SW456	MBA-I	19.4	390 m	multiple	2003–2019	17 Nov 2019	34	Disc.: NEAT	MPC · JPL
0	2003 SX456	MBA-O	16.8	2.4 km	multiple	2003–2020	31 Jul 2020	26	Disc.: Spacewatch	MPC · JPL
1	2003 SZ456	MBA-M	19.0	470 m	multiple	2003–2019	29 Sep 2019	33	Disc.: Spacewatch	MPC · JPL
0	2003 SA457	MBA-I	19.3	410 m	multiple	2003–2019	24 Oct 2019	27	Disc.: SDSS	MPC · JPL
0	2003 SB457	MBA-O	17.4	1.8 km	multiple	2003–2019	01 Oct 2019	33	Disc.: Spacewatch	MPC · JPL
0	2003 SC457	MBA-O	16.3	3.1 km	multiple	2003–2020	08 Dec 2020	25	Disc.: Spacewatch	MPC · JPL
1	2003 SE457	MBA-I	19.56	360 m	multiple	2003–2021	06 Jan 2021	24	Disc.: SDSS	MPC · JPL
0	2003 ST459 = (887243)	MBA-I	18.80	520 m	multiple	1996–2021	27 Oct 2021	66	Disc.: Spacewatch	MPC · JPL
0	2003 SD460 = (887244)	HUN	19.2	430 m	multiple	2003–2019	03 Sep 2019	32	Disc.: Spacewatch	MPC · JPL
0	2003 SF460	MBA-I	18.94	480 m	multiple	2003–2021	11 Jun 2021	55	Disc.: Mauna Kea Obs.	MPC · JPL
0	2003 SJ460	MBA-M	18.5	590 m	multiple	2003–2020	09 Dec 2020	36	Disc.: SDSS	MPC · JPL
0	2003 SK460	MCA	20.1	280 m	multiple	2003–2019	03 Oct 2019	44	Disc.: LPL/Spacewatch II	MPC · JPL
2	2003 SM460	MBA-M	19.0	470 m	multiple	2003–2019	29 Jul 2019	25	Disc.: Spacewatch	MPC · JPL
0	2003 SP460	MBA-O	17.4	1.8 km	multiple	2003–2020	12 Dec 2020	32	Disc.: LPL/Spacewatch II	MPC · JPL
2	2003 SS460	MBA-O	17.6	1.7 km	multiple	2003–2019	24 Aug 2019	27	Disc.: Spacewatch	MPC · JPL
1	2003 SU460	MBA-M	18.6	570 m	multiple	2003–2019	05 Jul 2019	82	Disc.: Spacewatch	MPC · JPL
1	2003 SV460	MBA-I	19.42	390 m	multiple	2003–2021	06 Nov 2021	68	Disc.: SDSS; Alt.: 2003 SK473	MPC · JPL
2	2003 SC461	MBA-M	18.9	490 m	multiple	2003–2019	26 Sep 2019	50	Disc.: Spacewatch	MPC · JPL
0	2003 SY461	MBA-O	18.2	1.3 km	multiple	2003–2019	03 Oct 2019	30	Disc.: SDSS	MPC · JPL
0	2003 SA462	MBA-O	17.5	1.8 km	multiple	2003–2019	02 Oct 2019	33	Disc.: Spacewatch	MPC · JPL
0	2003 SC462	MBA-O	17.1	2.1 km	multiple	2003–2019	03 Oct 2019	29	Disc.: LPL/Spacewatch II	MPC · JPL
0	2003 SF462	MBA-M	18.13	990 m	multiple	2003–2022	25 Jan 2022	41	Disc.: Spacewatch	MPC · JPL
3	2003 SG462	MBA-M	19.3	580 m	multiple	2003–2016	25 Oct 2016	19	Disc.: Spacewatch	MPC · JPL
0	2003 SH462	MBA-M	17.9	1.5 km	multiple	2003–2017	10 Oct 2017	36	Disc.: LPL/Spacewatch II	MPC · JPL
2	2003 SJ462	MBA-O	17.6	1.7 km	multiple	2003–2019	27 Oct 2019	22	Disc.: LPL/Spacewatch II	MPC · JPL
1	2003 SK462	MBA-M	19.2	800 m	multiple	2003–2017	28 Oct 2017	20	Disc.: Spacewatch	MPC · JPL
0	2003 SE463	MBA-I	18.8	520 m	multiple	2003–2018	15 Oct 2018	37	Disc.: SDSS	MPC · JPL
0	2003 SH463	MBA-I	17.9	780 m	multiple	2003–2019	05 Nov 2019	54	Disc.: Spacewatch; Alt.: 2010 OU114	MPC · JPL
0	2003 SL463	MBA-M	17.85	1.5 km	multiple	2003–2021	08 Sep 2021	53	Disc.: Spacewatch	MPC · JPL
0	2003 SQ463	MBA-M	18.4	620 m	multiple	2003–2019	29 Sep 2019	32	Disc.: SDSS	MPC · JPL
0	2003 SU463	MBA-O	17.4	1.8 km	multiple	2003–2020	19 Jan 2020	29	Disc.: SDSS	MPC · JPL
0	2003 SY463	MBA-I	18.41	620 m	multiple	2003–2021	15 Apr 2021	43	Disc.: LPL/Spacewatch II	MPC · JPL
0	2003 SA464	MBA-O	17.6	1.7 km	multiple	2003–2019	31 Dec 2019	26	Disc.: Spacewatch	MPC · JPL
2	2003 SB464	MBA-M	19.5	370 m	multiple	2003–2019	28 Oct 2019	30	Disc.: Spacewatch	MPC · JPL
2	2003 SC464	MBA-I	18.9	490 m	multiple	2003–2018	05 Aug 2018	20	Disc.: Spacewatch	MPC · JPL
2	2003 SE464	MBA-O	17.5	1.8 km	multiple	2003–2020	23 Oct 2020	47	Disc.: LPL/Spacewatch II	MPC · JPL
0	2003 SF464	HIL	16.9	2.3 km	multiple	2003–2019	19 Dec 2019	38	Disc.: Spacewatch; Added on 22 July 2020	MPC · JPL
0	2003 SL464	MBA-I	19.6	360 m	multiple	2003–2019	28 Oct 2019	39	Disc.: Spacewatch; Added on 22 July 2020	MPC · JPL
0	2003 SM464	MBA-M	18.08	1.3 km	multiple	2003–2021	10 Oct 2021	55	Disc.: Spacewatch; Added on 22 July 2020	MPC · JPL
4	2003 SN464	MBA-M	18.0	1.4 km	multiple	2003–2017	10 Nov 2017	26	Disc.: LPL/Spacewatch II; Added on 22 July 2020	MPC · JPL
1	2003 SD465	MBA-O	18.1	1.3 km	multiple	2003–2018	17 Nov 2018	40	Disc.: Spacewatch; Added on 22 July 2020	MPC · JPL
1	2003 SG465	MBA-O	18.5	1.1 km	multiple	2003–2018	29 Nov 2018	40	Disc.: Spacewatch; Added on 22 July 2020	MPC · JPL
0	2003 SH465	MBA-M	18.09	1.3 km	multiple	2003–2021	16 Jun 2021	47	Disc.: CINEOS; Added on 22 July 2020	MPC · JPL
0	2003 SR465	MBA-O	17.4	1.8 km	multiple	2003–2019	03 Oct 2019	28	Disc.: Spacewatch; Added on 17 January 2021	MPC · JPL
0	2003 SX465	MBA-I	18.6	570 m	multiple	2003–2019	07 Jun 2019	33	Disc.: Spacewatch; Added on 19 October 2020	MPC · JPL
0	2003 SY465	MBA-I	19.37	400 m	multiple	2003–2022	27 Jan 2022	55	Disc.: LPL/Spacewatch II; Added on 19 October 2020	MPC · JPL
0	2003 SZ465	MBA-I	18.9	490 m	multiple	2002–2020	22 Aug 2020	45	Disc.: LPL/Spacewatch II; Added on 19 October 2020	MPC · JPL
0	2003 SD466	MBA-M	18.1	1.0 km	multiple	2003–2020	16 Oct 2020	71	Disc.: Spacewatch; Added on 19 October 2020	MPC · JPL
1	2003 SK466	MBA-M	18.6	800 m	multiple	2003–2020	15 Oct 2020	64	Disc.: Spacewatch; Added on 19 October 2020	MPC · JPL
0	2003 SP466	MBA-I	18.7	540 m	multiple	2003–2018	18 Oct 2018	37	Disc.: Spacewatch; Added on 19 October 2020	MPC · JPL
0	2003 SR466	MBA-I	19.5	370 m	multiple	2003–2020	23 Sep 2020	51	Disc.: Spacewatch; Added on 19 October 2020	MPC · JPL
0	2003 SS466	MBA-I	19.0	470 m	multiple	2003–2016	25 Oct 2016	29	Disc.: CINEOS; Added on 19 October 2020	MPC · JPL
1	2003 SU466	MBA-O	17.6	1.7 km	multiple	2003–2020	23 Sep 2020	46	Disc.: Spacewatch; Added on 19 October 2020; Alt.: 2010 CX204	MPC · JPL
0	2003 SV466	MBA-O	17.91	1.5 km	multiple	2003–2021	08 May 2021	27	Disc.: LPL/Spacewatch II; Added on 19 October 2020	MPC · JPL
0	2003 SW466	MBA-M	18.6	800 m	multiple	2003–2021	04 Jan 2021	62	Disc.: Spacewatch; Added on 19 October 2020	MPC · JPL
2	2003 SX466	MBA-I	19.2	430 m	multiple	2003–2018	09 Nov 2018	25	Disc.: Spacewatch; Added on 19 October 2020	MPC · JPL
0	2003 SY466	MBA-M	18.4	880 m	multiple	2003–2016	27 Oct 2016	16	Disc.: Spacewatch; Added on 19 October 2020	MPC · JPL
1	2003 SZ466	MBA-I	19.2	430 m	multiple	2003–2017	14 Nov 2017	28	Disc.: Spacewatch; Added on 19 October 2020; Alt.: 2010 NY143	MPC · JPL
0	2003 SA467	MBA-M	17.82	1.5 km	multiple	2003–2021	03 Dec 2021	88	Disc.: SDSS; Added on 19 October 2020; Alt.: 2003 UE448	MPC · JPL
0	2003 SB467	MBA-M	18.2	960 m	multiple	2003–2020	11 Oct 2020	55	Disc.: Spacewatch; Added on 17 January 2021	MPC · JPL
1	2003 SD467	MBA-M	19.1	640 m	multiple	2003–2020	12 Sep 2020	30	Disc.: Spacewatch; Added on 17 January 2021	MPC · JPL
2	2003 SE467	MBA-M	18.4	880 m	multiple	2003–2020	13 Sep 2020	30	Disc.: Spacewatch; Added on 17 January 2021	MPC · JPL
0	2003 SL467	MBA-I	19.2	430 m	multiple	2003–2020	06 Dec 2020	67	Disc.: Spacewatch; Added on 17 January 2021	MPC · JPL
0	2003 SM467	MBA-M	18.1	1.0 km	multiple	2003–2021	05 Jan 2021	70	Disc.: Spacewatch; Added on 17 January 2021	MPC · JPL
2	2003 SO467	MBA-O	16.6	2.7 km	multiple	2003–2020	10 Nov 2020	57	Disc.: NEAT; Added on 17 January 2021	MPC · JPL
0	2003 SP467	MBA-O	17.02	2.2 km	multiple	2003–2021	02 Dec 2021	49	Disc.: Spacewatch; Added on 17 January 2021	MPC · JPL
0	2003 SQ467	MBA-I	19.0	470 m	multiple	2003–2018	14 Aug 2018	25	Disc.: Spacewatch; Added on 17 January 2021; Alt.: 2007 VZ313	MPC · JPL
0	2003 SR467	MBA-O	17.8	1.5 km	multiple	2003–2019	26 Sep 2019	16	Disc.: SDSS; Added on 17 January 2021	MPC · JPL
0	2003 SX467	MCA	18.9	490 m	multiple	2003–2020	15 Sep 2020	28	Disc.: SDSS; Added on 17 January 2021	MPC · JPL
0	2003 SY467	MBA-I	19.1	450 m	multiple	2003–2020	24 Jun 2020	31	Disc.: Spacewatch; Added on 17 January 2021	MPC · JPL
0	2003 SZ467	MBA-O	16.91	2.3 km	multiple	2003–2022	22 Jan 2022	53	Disc.: Spacewatch; Added on 17 January 2021	MPC · JPL
0	2003 SA468	MBA-I	18.0	750 m	multiple	2003–2019	02 Dec 2019	21	Disc.: SDSS; Added on 17 January 2021	MPC · JPL
0	2003 SC468	MBA-I	19.1	450 m	multiple	2003–2020	05 Nov 2020	68	Disc.: Spacewatch; Added on 17 January 2021	MPC · JPL
0	2003 SD468	MBA-O	17.6	1.7 km	multiple	2003–2020	26 Sep 2020	44	Disc.: Spacewatch; Added on 17 January 2021; Alt.: 2010 DC28	MPC · JPL
0	2003 SE468	MBA-O	17.22	2.0 km	multiple	2003–2022	27 Jan 2022	109	Disc.: Spacewatch; Added on 17 January 2021; Alt.: 2010 BK63	MPC · JPL
0	2003 SF468	MBA-I	18.7	540 m	multiple	2003–2020	26 Sep 2020	42	Disc.: Spacewatch; Added on 17 January 2021	MPC · JPL
1	2003 SH468	MBA-M	19.0	670 m	multiple	2003–2020	15 Oct 2020	22	Disc.: LPL/Spacewatch II; Added on 17 January 2021	MPC · JPL
2	2003 SL468	MBA-O	17.1	2.1 km	multiple	2003–2020	17 Oct 2020	38	Disc.: Spacewatch; Added on 17 January 2021	MPC · JPL
1	2003 SQ468	MCA	19.7	340 m	multiple	2003–2021	06 Jan 2021	49	Disc.: Spacewatch; Added on 17 January 2021	MPC · JPL
0	2003 SU468	MBA-I	18.9	490 m	multiple	2002–2020	17 Oct 2020	51	Disc.: Spacewatch; Added on 17 January 2021	MPC · JPL
0	2003 SV468	MBA-M	18.4	880 m	multiple	2003–2020	16 Oct 2020	50	Disc.: Spacewatch; Added on 17 January 2021	MPC · JPL
0	2003 SY468	MBA-O	17.8	1.5 km	multiple	2003–2020	05 Nov 2020	56	Disc.: Spacewatch; Added on 17 January 2021	MPC · JPL
0	2003 SZ468	MBA-M	17.8	1.2 km	multiple	2003–2021	05 Jan 2021	55	Disc.: LPL/Spacewatch II; Added on 17 January 2021	MPC · JPL
0	2003 SD469	MBA-M	18.3	920 m	multiple	2003–2020	15 Oct 2020	34	Disc.: Spacewatch; Added on 17 January 2021	MPC · JPL
0	2003 SH469	MBA-M	19.3	580 m	multiple	2003–2020	05 Nov 2020	32	Disc.: LPL/Spacewatch II; Added on 17 January 2021	MPC · JPL
2	2003 SK469	MBA-M	18.6	1.1 km	multiple	2001–2017	27 Oct 2017	35	Disc.: LPL/Spacewatch II; Added on 17 January 2021	MPC · JPL
2	2003 SO469	MBA-O	17.4	1.8 km	multiple	2003–2020	10 Nov 2020	28	Disc.: Spacewatch; Added on 17 January 2021	MPC · JPL
0	2003 SS469	MBA-O	18.2	1.3 km	multiple	2003–2020	12 Nov 2020	35	Disc.: Spacewatch; Added on 17 January 2021	MPC · JPL
0	2003 SW469	MBA-M	18.61	560 m	multiple	2003–2021	07 Jan 2021	39	Disc.: Spacewatch; Added on 17 January 2021	MPC · JPL
1	2003 SB470	MBA-I	20.1	280 m	multiple	2003–2017	24 Oct 2017	19	Disc.: SDSS; Added on 21 August 2021	MPC · JPL
1	2003 SF470	MBA-O	17.8	1.5 km	multiple	2003–2020	19 Nov 2020	36	Disc.: Spacewatch; Added on 17 January 2021	MPC · JPL
1	2003 SJ470	MBA-M	18.7	760 m	multiple	2003–2020	05 Dec 2020	28	Disc.: Spacewatch; Added on 17 January 2021	MPC · JPL
1	2003 SK470	MBA-M	18.7	760 m	multiple	2003–2020	08 Dec 2020	21	Disc.: Spacewatch; Added on 17 January 2021	MPC · JPL
0	2003 SL470	MCA	19.4	550 m	multiple	2003–2020	16 Dec 2020	38	Disc.: NEAT; Added on 17 January 2021	MPC · JPL
0	2003 SO470	MBA-M	17.81	1.5 km	multiple	2003–2021	28 Sep 2021	48	Disc.: LPL/Spacewatch II; Added on 9 March 2021	MPC · JPL
0	2003 ST470	MBA-I	19.29	410 m	multiple	2003–2022	04 Jan 2022	31	Disc.: Spacewatch; Added on 9 March 2021	MPC · JPL
1	2003 SW470	MBA-I	19.0	470 m	multiple	2003–2020	19 Nov 2020	23	Disc.: Spacewatch; Added on 11 May 2021	MPC · JPL
0	2003 SX470	MBA-I	18.6	570 m	multiple	2003–2020	17 Dec 2020	40	Disc.: Spacewatch; Added on 11 May 2021	MPC · JPL
0	2003 SZ470	MBA-O	17.7	1.6 km	multiple	2003–2020	10 Nov 2020	25	Disc.: SDSS; Added on 11 May 2021	MPC · JPL
0	2003 SE471	MBA-O	17.3	1.9 km	multiple	2003–2019	31 Dec 2019	30	Disc.: Spacewatch; Added on 17 June 2021	MPC · JPL
0	2003 SH471	MBA-I	19.32	410 m	multiple	2003–2021	07 Nov 2021	60	Disc.: LPL/Spacewatch II; Added on 17 June 2021	MPC · JPL
1	2003 SJ471	MBA-I	19.5	370 m	multiple	2003–2017	27 Nov 2017	22	Disc.: Spacewatch; Added on 17 June 2021	MPC · JPL
0	2003 SK471	MBA-I	18.65	550 m	multiple	2003–2020	20 Apr 2020	45	Disc.: Spacewatch; Added on 17 June 2021	MPC · JPL
1	2003 SM471	MBA-M	19.1	450 m	multiple	2003–2020	16 Dec 2020	18	Disc.: Spacewatch; Added on 17 June 2021	MPC · JPL
0	2003 SO471	MBA-I	19.0	470 m	multiple	2003–2018	14 Aug 2018	17	Disc.: Spacewatch; Added on 17 June 2021	MPC · JPL
2	2003 SP471	MBA-I	19.9	310 m	multiple	2003–2013	24 Sep 2013	16	Disc.: Spacewatch; Added on 21 August 2021	MPC · JPL
0	2003 SQ471	MBA-I	18.8	520 m	multiple	2003–2021	07 Feb 2021	34	Disc.: Spacewatch; Added on 21 August 2021	MPC · JPL
0	2003 SR471	MBA-O	18.1	1.3 km	multiple	2003–2018	10 Dec 2018	26	Disc.: Spacewatch; Added on 21 August 2021	MPC · JPL
2	2003 SY471 = (887246)	MBA-I	18.4	620 m	multiple	2003–2021	10 Jul 2021	21	Disc.: Spacewatch; Added on 21 August 2021	MPC · JPL
0	2003 SZ471	MBA-I	18.70	540 m	multiple	2003–2021	14 Nov 2021	66	Disc.: Spacewatch; Added on 21 August 2021	MPC · JPL
0	2003 SA472	MBA-I	18.8	520 m	multiple	2003–2020	21 Apr 2020	20	Disc.: Spacewatch; Added on 21 August 2021	MPC · JPL
0	2003 SB472	MBA-M	17.75	1.6 km	multiple	2003–2021	15 Aug 2021	28	Disc.: SDSS; Added on 21 August 2021	MPC · JPL
0	2003 SC472	MBA-M	18.83	950 m	multiple	2003–2021	26 Oct 2021	43	Disc.: Spacewatch; Added on 21 August 2021	MPC · JPL
1	2003 SD472	MBA-M	18.4	880 m	multiple	2003–2020	29 Jul 2020	23	Disc.: Pan-STARRS; Added on 21 August 2021	MPC · JPL
1	2003 SF472	MBA-I	19.1	450 m	multiple	2003–2017	28 Oct 2017	29	Disc.: Spacewatch; Added on 21 August 2021	MPC · JPL
0	2003 SG472	MBA-I	18.9	490 m	multiple	2003–2017	21 Sep 2017	32	Disc.: LPL/Spacewatch II; Added on 21 August 2021	MPC · JPL
1	2003 SH472	MBA-O	17.8	1.5 km	multiple	2003–2019	04 Sep 2019	28	Disc.: Spacewatch; Added on 21 August 2021	MPC · JPL
0	2003 SJ472	MBA-M	18.59	800 m	multiple	2003–2021	30 Nov 2021	27	Disc.: Spacewatch; Added on 21 August 2021	MPC · JPL
0	2003 SK472	MBA-M	18.2	960 m	multiple	2003–2020	28 Jun 2020	21	Disc.: SDSS; Added on 21 August 2021	MPC · JPL
0	2003 SL472	MBA-M	17.9	1.5 km	multiple	2003–2021	10 Aug 2021	21	Disc.: SDSS; Added on 21 August 2021	MPC · JPL
1	2003 SM472	MBA-O	17.9	1.5 km	multiple	2003–2019	29 Jul 2019	27	Disc.: Spacewatch; Added on 21 August 2021	MPC · JPL
0	2003 SO472	MBA-I	18.7	540 m	multiple	2003–2021	02 Oct 2021	55	Disc.: Spacewatch; Added on 21 August 2021	MPC · JPL
0	2003 ST472	MBA-M	17.6	1.7 km	multiple	2003–2021	24 Sep 2021	46	Disc.: Spacewatch; Added on 30 September 2021	MPC · JPL
0	2003 SU472	MBA-I	19.55	370 m	multiple	2003–2021	28 Sep 2021	36	Disc.: Spacewatch; Added on 30 September 2021	MPC · JPL
0	2003 SP473	MBA-M	17.87	1.5 km	multiple	2003–2021	09 Sep 2021	30	Disc.: Spacewatch; Added on 30 September 2021	MPC · JPL
0	2003 SR473	MBA-I	19.28	410 m	multiple	2003–2021	07 Nov 2021	52	Disc.: Spacewatch; Added on 30 September 2021	MPC · JPL
0	2003 SS473	MBA-M	17.85	1.5 km	multiple	2003–2021	03 Oct 2021	31	Disc.: Spacewatch; Added on 30 September 2021	MPC · JPL
1	2003 ST473	MBA-M	18.79	970 m	multiple	2003–2021	04 Oct 2021	29	Disc.: Spacewatch; Added on 30 September 2021	MPC · JPL
0	2003 SV473	MBA-M	18.91	920 m	multiple	2003–2021	24 Oct 2021	37	Disc.: Spacewatch; Added on 30 September 2021	MPC · JPL
0	2003 SX473	MBA-I	18.7	540 m	multiple	2003–2020	07 Oct 2020	43	Disc.: Spacewatch; Added on 30 September 2021	MPC · JPL
1	2003 SY473	MBA-M	19.05	860 m	multiple	2003–2021	06 Oct 2021	36	Disc.: LPL/Spacewatch II; Added on 30 September 2021	MPC · JPL
0	2003 SZ473	MBA-M	18.09	1.3 km	multiple	2002–2021	06 Nov 2021	50	Disc.: Spacewatch; Added on 30 September 2021	MPC · JPL
0	2003 SA474	HUN	19.22	430 m	multiple	2003–2021	08 Nov 2021	72	Disc.: Spacewatch; Added on 30 September 2021	MPC · JPL
0	2003 SB474	MBA-O	17.1	2.1 km	multiple	2003–2020	10 Nov 2020	24	Disc.: Spacewatch; Added on 5 November 2021	MPC · JPL
0	2003 SD474	MBA-I	18.98	480 m	multiple	2003–2021	06 Nov 2021	50	Disc.: Spacewatch; Added on 5 November 2021	MPC · JPL
0	2003 SE474 = (887247)	MBA-I	19.03	460 m	multiple	2003–2021	24 Oct 2021	36	Disc.: Spacewatch; Added on 5 November 2021	MPC · JPL
0	2003 SF474	MBA-M	17.86	1.5 km	multiple	2003–2021	06 Nov 2021	54	Disc.: SDSS; Added on 5 November 2021	MPC · JPL
2	2003 SG474	MBA-M	18.67	1.0 km	multiple	2003–2021	25 Nov 2021	39	Disc.: Spacewatch; Added on 5 November 2021	MPC · JPL
0	2003 SL474	HUN	19.6	360 m	multiple	2003–2021	15 Apr 2021	19	Disc.: Spacewatch; Added on 5 November 2021	MPC · JPL
0	2003 SO474	MBA-M	17.7	1.6 km	multiple	2003–2021	04 Oct 2021	32	Disc.: Spacewatch; Added on 5 November 2021	MPC · JPL
0	2003 SP474	MBA-M	18.12	1.3 km	multiple	2003–2021	08 Jul 2021	29	Disc.: NEAT; Added on 5 November 2021	MPC · JPL
1	2003 SR474	MBA-M	18.89	930 m	multiple	2003–2021	28 Nov 2021	50	Disc.: Spacewatch; Added on 5 November 2021	MPC · JPL
0	2003 SS474 = (887248)	MBA-I	19.25	420 m	multiple	2003–2021	30 Nov 2021	70	Disc.: Spacewatch; Added on 24 December 2021	MPC · JPL
0	2003 ST474	MBA-I	19.00	470 m	multiple	2002–2021	09 Nov 2021	47	Disc.: Spacewatch; Added on 24 December 2021	MPC · JPL
0	2003 SU474	MBA-I	19.25	420 m	multiple	2003–2021	30 Nov 2021	48	Disc.: Spacewatch; Added on 24 December 2021	MPC · JPL
0	2003 SV474	MBA-I	18.87	500 m	multiple	2003–2021	08 Dec 2021	48	Disc.: Spacewatch; Added on 24 December 2021	MPC · JPL
0	2003 SW474	MBA-O	18.16	1.3 km	multiple	2001–2019	24 Oct 2019	19	Disc.: Spacewatch; Added on 24 December 2021	MPC · JPL
2	2003 SY474	MBA-O	18.7	1.0 km	multiple	2003–2019	23 Oct 2019	15	Disc.: SDSS; Added on 24 December 2021	MPC · JPL
0	2003 SZ474	MBA-I	18.8	520 m	multiple	2003–2021	09 Dec 2021	45	Disc.: Spacewatch; Added on 24 December 2021	MPC · JPL
2	2003 SB475	MBA-M	18.5	590 m	multiple	2003–2015	21 Aug 2015	19	Disc.: Spacewatch; Added on 29 January 2022	MPC · JPL
0	2003 SC475	MBA-O	18.0	1.4 km	multiple	2003–2019	25 Sep 2019	19	Disc.: Spacewatch; Added on 29 January 2022	MPC · JPL
3	2003 SD475	MBA-M	18.5	1.1 km	multiple	2003–2017	10 Nov 2017	17	Disc.: Spacewatch; Added on 29 January 2022	MPC · JPL
0	2003 SE475	MBA-I	18.7	540 m	multiple	2003–2016	08 Sep 2016	24	Disc.: No observations Added on 29 January 2022	MPC · JPL

back to top
