= List of unnumbered minor planets: 2003 U (380–429) =

This is a partial list of unnumbered minor planets for principal provisional designations assigned during 16–31 October 2003. Since this period yielded a high number of provisional discoveries, it is further split into several standalone pages. As of November 2025, a total of 118 bodies remain unnumbered for this period. Objects for this year are listed on the following pages: A–E · F–G · H–L · M–R · S_{i} · S_{ii} · S_{iii} · S_{iv} · T · U_{i} · U_{ii} · U_{iii} · U_{iv} · V · W_{i} · W_{ii} and X–Y. Also see previous and next year.

Near-Earth obj.	MBA (inner)	MBA (outer)	Centaur
Mars-crosser	MBA (middle)	Jupiter trojan	Trans-Neptunian obj.
Unclassified

== U ==
U	Designation	Class	Physical		Observations				Description and notes	Ref
U	Designation	Class	H	D	Opp.	Arc	Last	Used	Description and notes	Ref
–	2003 UJ380	MBA-M	19.1	640 m	single	5 days	24 Oct 2003	6	Disc.: SDSS	MPC · JPL
2	2003 UR380	HIL	16.8	2.4 km	multiple	2003–2019	28 Nov 2019	38	Disc.: SDSS	MPC · JPL
0	2003 UT381	MBA-M	18.2	960 m	multiple	2003–2020	10 Dec 2020	51	Disc.: SDSS	MPC · JPL
–	2003 UX381	MBA-I	20.5	240 m	single	24 days	24 Oct 2003	11	Disc.: SDSS	MPC · JPL
0	2003 UE382	MBA-I	19.23	420 m	multiple	1996–2021	08 Nov 2021	41	Disc.: SDSS	MPC · JPL
0	2003 UY382	MBA-O	17.1	2.1 km	multiple	2003–2020	27 Jan 2020	101	Disc.: LONEOS; Alt.: 2003 TH59, 2019 SS11	MPC · JPL
–	2003 UA383	MBA-M	19.8	330 m	single	4 days	23 Oct 2003	6	Disc.: SDSS	MPC · JPL
0	2003 UE383	MBA-I	19.23	420 m	multiple	2003–2021	06 Nov 2021	44	Disc.: SDSS; Added on 5 November 2021	MPC · JPL
0	2003 UU383	MBA-M	18.7	540 m	multiple	2003–2020	24 Dec 2020	34	Disc.: SDSS; Alt.: 2007 RP198	MPC · JPL
0	2003 UV383	MBA-M	18.44	1.1 km	multiple	2003–2021	24 Nov 2021	65	Disc.: SDSS	MPC · JPL
0	2003 UB384	MBA-O	17.5	1.8 km	multiple	2003–2021	04 Jan 2021	37	Disc.: SDSS	MPC · JPL
0	2003 UD384	MBA-M	19.0	670 m	multiple	2003–2020	07 Nov 2020	36	Disc.: SDSS; Alt.: 2020 PW33	MPC · JPL
0	2003 UK384	MBA-M	18.5	840 m	multiple	2003–2020	18 Oct 2020	51	Disc.: SDSS	MPC · JPL
3	2003 UP384	MBA-I	19.59	330 m	multiple	2003-2022	22 Sep 2022	20	Disc.: SDSS	MPC · JPL
0	2003 US384	MBA-O	17.1	2.1 km	multiple	2003–2019	26 Nov 2019	37	Disc.: SDSS	MPC · JPL
3	2003 UX384	MBA-M	18.4	1.2 km	multiple	2003–2017	09 Dec 2017	26	Disc.: SDSS; Alt.: 2017 XB47	MPC · JPL
2	2003 UC385	HIL	16.9	2.3 km	multiple	2003–2019	24 Dec 2019	37	Disc.: SDSS	MPC · JPL
0	2003 UF385	MBA-O	18.1	1.3 km	multiple	2003–2018	03 Nov 2018	42	Disc.: SDSS; Alt.: 2008 UE86	MPC · JPL
0	2003 UJ385	MBA-M	17.8	820 m	multiple	2003–2020	17 Dec 2020	24	Disc.: SDSS; Alt.: 2007 RA255	MPC · JPL
2	2003 UO385	MBA-M	19.0	670 m	multiple	2003–2020	14 Nov 2020	28	Disc.: SDSS	MPC · JPL
1	2003 UJ386 = (887254)	MBA-M	18.30	1.2 km	multiple	2003–2021	06 Oct 2021	48	Disc.: SDSS; Added on 5 November 2021	MPC · JPL
0	2003 UQ386	MBA-O	17.7	1.6 km	multiple	2003–2020	27 Jan 2020	36	Disc.: SDSS; Added on 22 July 2020; Alt.: 2015 AT228	MPC · JPL
0	2003 UD387	MBA-I	19.3	410 m	multiple	2003–2020	19 Oct 2020	24	Disc.: SDSS; Added on 17 January 2021	MPC · JPL
0	2003 UL387	MBA-O	17.18	2.0 km	multiple	2003–2021	28 Nov 2021	38	Disc.: SDSS; Added on 19 October 2020	MPC · JPL
0	2003 UQ387	MBA-I	18.47	600 m	multiple	2003–2022	26 Jan 2022	53	Disc.: SDSS	MPC · JPL
0	2003 UV387	MBA-M	17.14	2.1 km	multiple	2003–2021	28 Oct 2021	42	Disc.: SDSS; Added on 30 September 2021	MPC · JPL
0	2003 UZ387	MBA-O	17.4	1.8 km	multiple	2003–2019	26 Nov 2019	25	Disc.: SDSS; Added on 17 January 2021	MPC · JPL
2	2003 UA388	MBA-I	19.4	390 m	multiple	2003–2019	28 Nov 2019	18	Disc.: SDSS	MPC · JPL
0	2003 UK388	MBA-I	18.83	510 m	multiple	2003–2021	10 Nov 2021	49	Disc.: SDSS; Added on 22 July 2020; Alt.: 2014 WX458	MPC · JPL
0	2003 UP388	MBA-M	18.26	940 m	multiple	2003–2021	08 Dec 2021	46	Disc.: SDSS	MPC · JPL
0	2003 UU388	MBA-I	18.80	520 m	multiple	2003–2021	27 Nov 2021	55	Disc.: Spacewatch; Added on 5 November 2021; Alt.: 2021 RB70	MPC · JPL
0	2003 UF389	MBA-M	18.6	800 m	multiple	2003–2020	20 Oct 2020	37	Disc.: SDSS; Added on 17 January 2021	MPC · JPL
1	2003 UH389	MBA-O	17.4	1.8 km	multiple	2003–2020	10 Dec 2020	52	Disc.: SDSS	MPC · JPL
1	2003 UA390	MBA-M	18.50	1.1 km	multiple	2003–2021	31 Oct 2021	37	Disc.: SDSS; Added on 5 November 2021	MPC · JPL
1	2003 UN390	MBA-M	18.9	490 m	multiple	2003–2015	03 Oct 2015	29	Disc.: SDSS; Alt.: 2015 PV79	MPC · JPL
0	2003 UR390	MBA-I	18.9	490 m	multiple	2003–2019	06 Jul 2019	28	Disc.: SDSS; Added on 17 January 2021	MPC · JPL
0	2003 US390	MBA-O	17.7	1.6 km	multiple	2003–2019	21 Oct 2019	21	Disc.: SDSS	MPC · JPL
0	2003 UX390	MBA-I	18.9	490 m	multiple	2003–2020	08 Dec 2020	39	Disc.: SDSS	MPC · JPL
0	2003 UY391	MBA-M	18.3	1.2 km	multiple	2003–2018	05 Jan 2018	63	Disc.: SDSS	MPC · JPL
0	2003 UZ391	MBA-I	18.3	650 m	multiple	2003–2020	05 Mar 2020	45	Disc.: SDSS	MPC · JPL
1	2003 UC392	MBA-I	18.8	520 m	multiple	2003–2021	30 Nov 2021	39	Disc.: SDSS	MPC · JPL
0	2003 UD392	MBA-O	17.48	1.8 km	multiple	2003–2021	15 Apr 2021	48	Disc.: SDSS; Alt.: 2015 AJ172	MPC · JPL
1	2003 UR392	MBA-O	17.3	1.9 km	multiple	2003–2019	28 Sep 2019	25	Disc.: SDSS	MPC · JPL
0	2003 UU392	MBA-O	17.91	1.5 km	multiple	2003-2022	20 Oct 2022	69	Disc.: SDSS	MPC · JPL
0	2003 UC393	MBA-M	18.2	960 m	multiple	2003–2011	01 Aug 2011	18	Disc.: Kitt Peak Obs. Alt.: 2011 OM47	MPC · JPL
2	2003 UD393	MBA-M	19.0	470 m	multiple	2003–2019	29 Oct 2019	41	Disc.: SDSS	MPC · JPL
0	2003 US393	MBA-O	17.8	1.5 km	multiple	2003–2018	07 Sep 2018	17	Disc.: SDSS	MPC · JPL
1	2003 UL395	MBA-M	18.1	710 m	multiple	2003–2019	29 Oct 2019	18	Disc.: SDSS	MPC · JPL
0	2003 UK396	MBA-M	19.1	450 m	multiple	2003–2019	19 Dec 2019	79	Disc.: SDSS; Alt.: 2015 TB141	MPC · JPL
0	2003 UQ396	MBA-M	17.9	1.1 km	multiple	2003–2020	17 Nov 2020	25	Disc.: SDSS; Added on 21 August 2021	MPC · JPL
2	2003 UV396	MBA-M	19.4	550 m	multiple	2003–2016	25 Oct 2016	15	Disc.: SDSS	MPC · JPL
0	2003 UY397	MBA-M	18.0	1.1 km	multiple	2003–2020	20 Dec 2020	41	Disc.: SDSS; Added on 17 January 2021	MPC · JPL
0	2003 UA398	MBA-M	17.89	1.5 km	multiple	2003–2021	04 Dec 2021	51	Disc.: SDSS; Added on 24 December 2021	MPC · JPL
0	2003 UK398	MCA	19.08	450 m	multiple	2003–2021	29 Nov 2021	31	Disc.: SDSS; Added on 21 August 2021	MPC · JPL
1	2003 UV398	MBA-M	18.5	590 m	multiple	2003–2019	26 Sep 2019	41	Disc.: SDSS	MPC · JPL
1	2003 UY398	MBA-M	18.34	1.2 km	multiple	2003–2021	23 Nov 2021	35	Disc.: SDSS; Added on 5 November 2021	MPC · JPL
1	2003 UL401	MBA-I	19.0	470 m	multiple	2003–2017	14 Sep 2017	32	Disc.: SDSS; Added on 17 January 2021; Alt.: 2017 PW15	MPC · JPL
–	2003 UR401	MBA-M	19.4	390 m	single	36 days	24 Oct 2003	13	Disc.: SDSS	MPC · JPL
0	2003 UV401	MBA-O	17.3	1.9 km	multiple	2003–2019	02 Dec 2019	30	Disc.: SDSS	MPC · JPL
4	2003 UW401	MBA-M	18.4	880 m	multiple	2003–2012	10 Dec 2012	16	Disc.: LPL/Spacewatch II; Added on 5 November 2021; Alt.: 2012 XV174	MPC · JPL
2	2003 UJ402	MBA-I	19.78	360 m	multiple	2003-2021	24 Oct 2003	34	Disc.: SDSS	MPC · JPL
0	2003 UQ402	MBA-I	18.92	490 m	multiple	2003–2021	29 Nov 2021	61	Disc.: Kitt Peak Obs. Alt.: 2006 KB138	MPC · JPL
3	2003 UW402	MBA-I	19.0	470 m	multiple	2003–2014	19 Sep 2014	36	Disc.: SDSS; Alt.: 2014 RJ39	MPC · JPL
0	2003 UF403	MBA-I	18.9	490 m	multiple	2003–2018	10 Nov 2018	39	Disc.: SDSS	MPC · JPL
0	2003 UM403	MBA-I	18.9	490 m	multiple	2003–2018	18 Aug 2018	27	Disc.: SDSS	MPC · JPL
1	2003 UN403	MBA-M	18.9	490 m	multiple	2003–2019	15 Jun 2019	36	Disc.: SDSS	MPC · JPL
0	2003 UO403 = (887255)	MBA-M	18.62	790 m	multiple	2003–2020	17 Oct 2020	34	Disc.: SDSS	MPC · JPL
0	2003 UR403	MBA-I	19.3	410 m	multiple	2003–2020	16 Nov 2020	43	Disc.: SDSS; Added on 17 January 2021	MPC · JPL
1	2003 UT403	MBA-M	18.9	490 m	multiple	2003–2020	19 Dec 2020	17	Disc.: SDSS	MPC · JPL
2	2003 UV403	MBA-I	19.43	340 m	multiple	2003-2023	20 Sep 2023	23	Disc.: SDSS	MPC · JPL
1	2003 UJ404	MBA-M	18.6	570 m	multiple	2003–2020	22 Nov 2020	14	Disc.: SDSS; Added on 17 January 2021	MPC · JPL
2	2003 UP404	MBA-M	19.5	530 m	multiple	2003–2016	20 Oct 2016	24	Disc.: SDSS; Alt.: 2016 QO100	MPC · JPL
0	2003 US404	MBA-M	17.9	1.1 km	multiple	2003–2020	17 Oct 2020	34	Disc.: SDSS; Added on 17 January 2021	MPC · JPL
0	2003 UM405	MBA-I	18.8	520 m	multiple	2003–2020	16 Nov 2020	39	Disc.: SDSS	MPC · JPL
1	2003 UT405	MBA-I	19.4	390 m	multiple	2003–2020	10 Dec 2020	19	Disc.: SDSS; Added on 21 August 2021	MPC · JPL
0	2003 UK406	MBA-I	18.91	490 m	multiple	2003–2021	10 Jul 2021	30	Disc.: SDSS; Alt.: 2014 ST204	MPC · JPL
1	2003 UX406 = (887256)	MBA-M	18.01	1.4 km	multiple	2003–2021	10 Nov 2021	52	Disc.: SDSS	MPC · JPL
2	2003 UB407	MBA-I	18.9	490 m	multiple	2003–2020	18 Oct 2020	51	Disc.: SDSS	MPC · JPL
1	2003 UF407	MBA-I	19.1	450 m	multiple	2003–2020	21 Sep 2020	47	Disc.: SDSS; Added on 19 October 2020	MPC · JPL
0	2003 UQ407	MBA-O	17.4	1.8 km	multiple	2003–2019	24 Oct 2019	25	Disc.: SDSS; Added on 22 July 2020	MPC · JPL
0	2003 UA408	MBA-O	18.0	1.4 km	multiple	2003–2018	11 Aug 2018	32	Disc.: SDSS	MPC · JPL
1	2003 UO408	MBA-M	18.85	950 m	multiple	2003–2021	30 Nov 2021	77	Disc.: SDSS; Added on 5 November 2021; Alt.: 2012 UK237	MPC · JPL
2	2003 UP408	MBA-O	17.6	1.7 km	multiple	2003–2020	16 Nov 2020	29	Disc.: SDSS; Added on 17 January 2021; Alt.: 2014 SY184	MPC · JPL
1	2003 UC409	MBA-M	18.3	650 m	multiple	2003–2019	29 Oct 2019	27	Disc.: SDSS; Added on 22 July 2020	MPC · JPL
0	2003 UD409	MBA-O	17.3	1.9 km	multiple	2003–2021	07 Feb 2021	23	Disc.: SDSS; Added on 21 August 2021	MPC · JPL
0	2003 UG409	MBA-M	17.8	1.2 km	multiple	2003–2021	06 Jan 2021	71	Disc.: SDSS; Added on 17 January 2021	MPC · JPL
0	2003 UJ409	MBA-O	17.3	1.9 km	multiple	2003–2018	18 Aug 2018	15	Disc.: SDSS; Added on 21 August 2021	MPC · JPL
0	2003 UN409	MBA-O	17.30	1.9 km	multiple	2003–2021	13 Apr 2021	33	Disc.: SDSS; Added on 17 June 2021; Alt.: 2019 TN33	MPC · JPL
0	2003 UT409	MBA-O	17.1	2.1 km	multiple	2003–2021	09 Jan 2021	40	Disc.: SDSS; Added on 22 July 2020	MPC · JPL
0	2003 UX409 = (887257)	MBA-O	17.84	1.5 km	multiple	2003–2021	11 Feb 2021	34	Disc.: SDSS; Added on 21 August 2021	MPC · JPL
0	2003 UD410	MBA-M	17.8	1.5 km	multiple	2003–2021	27 Nov 2021	43	Disc.: SDSS; Added on 29 January 2022	MPC · JPL
1	2003 UF410	MBA-M	19.3	580 m	multiple	2003–2020	16 Nov 2020	20	Disc.: SDSS; Added on 17 June 2021; Alt.: 2020 TY68	MPC · JPL
0	2003 UG410	MBA-I	19.0	470 m	multiple	2003–2019	26 Nov 2019	49	Disc.: SDSS	MPC · JPL
0	2003 UC411	MBA-M	18.18	1.3 km	multiple	2003–2021	27 Nov 2021	48	Disc.: SDSS; Added on 5 November 2021	MPC · JPL
0	2003 UJ411	MBA-O	17.5	1.8 km	multiple	2003–2020	09 Oct 2020	28	Disc.: SDSS; Added on 17 January 2021	MPC · JPL
0	2003 UM411 = (887258)	MBA-M	19.1	640 m	multiple	2003–2020	13 Aug 2020	18	Disc.: SDSS; Added on 21 August 2021; Alt.: 2013 AW43	MPC · JPL
0	2003 UG412	MBA-M	18.4	880 m	multiple	2003–2020	20 Dec 2020	31	Disc.: SDSS; Added on 9 March 2021	MPC · JPL
0	2003 UM413	MBA-M	19.1	450 m	multiple	2003–2021	17 Feb 2021	24	Disc.: Kitt Peak Obs. Added on 5 November 2021	MPC · JPL
9	2003 UC414	TNO	8.3	122 km	single	58 days	27 Dec 2003	19	Disc.: Cerro Tololo Obs. LoUTNOs, centaur	MPC · JPL
0	2003 UX414	HIL	16.3	3.1 km	multiple	2003–2021	18 Jan 2021	60	Disc.: SDSS; Alt.: 2011 VU2	MPC · JPL
0	2003 UF415	MBA-I	18.9	490 m	multiple	2003–2020	16 Sep 2020	57	Disc.: Tenagra II Obs.	MPC · JPL
–	2003 UQ416	MBA-M	19.6	360 m	single	5 days	24 Oct 2003	6	Disc.: SDSS	MPC · JPL
0	2003 UN417	MBA-M	18.25	940 m	multiple	2003–2021	09 Dec 2021	26	Disc.: Spacewatch; Added on 21 August 2021	MPC · JPL
1	2003 UP417	MBA-O	17.5	1.8 km	multiple	2003–2020	16 Nov 2020	33	Disc.: SDSS; Added on 17 January 2021; Alt.: 2014 SL78	MPC · JPL
0	2003 UT427	MBA-I	18.4	620 m	multiple	2003–2020	12 Jul 2020	53	—	MPC · JPL
0	2003 UW427	MBA-M	18.23	950 m	multiple	2003–2022	07 Jan 2022	42	—	MPC · JPL
0	2003 UX427	MBA-M	17.6	1.3 km	multiple	2003–2020	20 Oct 2020	40	—	MPC · JPL
0	2003 US428	MCA	18.8	520 m	multiple	2003–2020	25 Apr 2020	45	—	MPC · JPL
0	2003 UY428	MBA-I	18.8	520 m	multiple	2003–2020	06 Dec 2020	70	—	MPC · JPL
0	2003 UJ429	MBA-I	18.8	520 m	multiple	2003–2019	22 Aug 2019	63	—	MPC · JPL
0	2003 UN429	MBA-I	18.1	710 m	multiple	2003–2020	23 Jan 2020	52	Alt.: 2003 SG368	MPC · JPL
1	2003 UT429	MBA-I	19.3	410 m	multiple	2003–2017	24 Nov 2017	39	—	MPC · JPL
0	2003 UY429	MBA-I	18.8	520 m	multiple	2003–2020	14 Sep 2020	51	—	MPC · JPL

back to top
