= List of unnumbered minor planets: 2003 W (200–619) =

This is a partial list of unnumbered minor planets for principal provisional designations assigned during 16–30 November 2003. Since this period yielded a high number of provisional discoveries, it is further split into several standalone pages. As of November 2025, a total of 84 bodies remain unnumbered for this period. Objects for this year are listed on the following pages: A–E · F–G · H–L · M–R · S_{i} · S_{ii} · S_{iii} · S_{iv} · T · U_{i} · U_{ii} · U_{iii} · U_{iv} · V · W_{i} · W_{ii} and X–Y. Also see previous and next year.

Near-Earth obj.	MBA (inner)	MBA (outer)	Centaur
Mars-crosser	MBA (middle)	Jupiter trojan	Trans-Neptunian obj.
Unclassified

== W ==
U	Designation	Class	Physical		Observations				Description and notes	Ref
U	Designation	Class	H	D	Opp.	Arc	Last	Used	Description and notes	Ref
0	2003 WK200	MBA-M	17.3	1.9 km	multiple	2003–2019	08 Jan 2019	47	Disc.: Spacewatch	MPC · JPL
0	2003 WM201	MBA-M	18.1	710 m	multiple	2003–2021	18 Jan 2021	50	Disc.: LPL/Spacewatch II	MPC · JPL
0	2003 WO202	MBA-I	19.16	440 m	multiple	2003–2021	09 Dec 2021	42	Disc.: Spacewatch	MPC · JPL
0	2003 WP202	MBA-I	18.8	520 m	multiple	2003–2020	14 Aug 2020	43	Disc.: Spacewatch	MPC · JPL
0	2003 WU202	MBA-I	18.62	560 m	multiple	2003–2022	22 Jan 2022	60	Disc.: Spacewatch	MPC · JPL
0	2003 WO203	MBA-I	18.5	590 m	multiple	2003–2020	02 Feb 2020	49	Disc.: Kitt Peak Obs.	MPC · JPL
1	2003 WV203	MBA-M	19.0	470 m	multiple	2003–2015	11 Aug 2015	28	Disc.: Spacewatch	MPC · JPL
1	2003 WY203	MBA-I	18.74	530 m	multiple	2003–2022	07 Jan 2022	33	Disc.: Spacewatch	MPC · JPL
0	2003 WA204	MBA-I	19.56	360 m	multiple	2003–2022	25 Jan 2022	41	Disc.: Spacewatch	MPC · JPL
0	2003 WF204	MBA-I	18.8	520 m	multiple	2003–2021	03 Jan 2021	56	Disc.: Spacewatch	MPC · JPL
0	2003 WH204	MBA-O	16.8	2.4 km	multiple	2003–2019	28 Nov 2019	49	Disc.: Spacewatch	MPC · JPL
0	2003 WK204 = (887271)	MBA-M	18.02	1.0 km	multiple	2003–2022	27 Jan 2022	42	Disc.: Spacewatch	MPC · JPL
0	2003 WN204	MBA-O	17.1	2.1 km	multiple	2003–2021	18 Jan 2021	40	Disc.: Kitt Peak Obs.	MPC · JPL
0	2003 WO204 = (887272)	MBA-O	17.1	2.1 km	multiple	2003–2021	10 Jan 2021	43	Disc.: Spacewatch	MPC · JPL
0	2003 WP204	HUN	18.9	490 m	multiple	2003–2021	14 Jan 2021	47	Disc.: Spacewatch	MPC · JPL
0	2003 WT204	MBA-I	18.82	510 m	multiple	2003–2021	09 Nov 2021	60	Disc.: Spacewatch	MPC · JPL
0	2003 WU204	MBA-M	17.9	780 m	multiple	2003–2020	12 Dec 2020	33	Disc.: Spacewatch	MPC · JPL
0	2003 WV204	MBA-O	17.4	1.8 km	multiple	2003–2021	05 Jan 2021	44	Disc.: SDSS; Alt.: 2010 EO153	MPC · JPL
0	2003 WJ207	MBA-O	17.6	1.7 km	multiple	2003–2019	28 Oct 2019	48	Disc.: SDSS	MPC · JPL
0	2003 WK207	MBA-O	16.8	2.4 km	multiple	2003–2018	10 Nov 2018	58	Disc.: Spacewatch	MPC · JPL
0	2003 WY207	MBA-I	18.47	600 m	multiple	2003–2021	30 Jun 2021	51	Disc.: Spacewatch	MPC · JPL
0	2003 WZ207	MBA-O	16.6	2.7 km	multiple	2003–2019	02 Nov 2019	54	Disc.: Spacewatch	MPC · JPL
0	2003 WG208	MBA-I	19.06	460 m	multiple	2003–2021	30 Sep 2021	47	Disc.: Spacewatch	MPC · JPL
0	2003 WN208	MBA-I	19.47	380 m	multiple	2003–2019	01 Oct 2019	37	Disc.: Kitt Peak Obs.	MPC · JPL
0	2003 WV208	MBA-I	18.37	630 m	multiple	2003–2021	10 Sep 2021	48	Disc.: Spacewatch	MPC · JPL
0	2003 WW208	MBA-I	18.96	480 m	multiple	2003–2021	01 Dec 2021	37	Disc.: Spacewatch	MPC · JPL
0	2003 WD209	MBA-M	17.7	1.6 km	multiple	2003–2020	12 Aug 2020	42	Disc.: Kitt Peak Obs.	MPC · JPL
0	2003 WE209	MBA-M	18.7	540 m	multiple	2003–2019	01 Nov 2019	57	Disc.: Spacewatch	MPC · JPL
2	2003 WL209	MBA-O	17.5	1.8 km	multiple	2003–2019	02 Jan 2019	36	Disc.: Kitt Peak Obs.	MPC · JPL
0	2003 WQ209	HUN	19.0	470 m	multiple	2003–2021	11 Jun 2021	57	Disc.: LPL/Spacewatch II	MPC · JPL
0	2003 WR209	MBA-I	18.6	570 m	multiple	2003–2019	06 Jan 2019	33	Disc.: Kitt Peak Obs.	MPC · JPL
0	2003 WS209	MBA-I	18.6	570 m	multiple	2003–2020	29 Jun 2020	32	Disc.: Kitt Peak Obs.	MPC · JPL
0	2003 WW209	MBA-I	18.8	520 m	multiple	1996–2020	20 Oct 2020	69	Disc.: Spacewatch	MPC · JPL
1	2003 WC210	MBA-M	19.1	450 m	multiple	2003–2019	02 Sep 2019	78	Disc.: Kitt Peak Obs.	MPC · JPL
0	2003 WJ211	MBA-I	18.84	510 m	multiple	2003–2021	16 Oct 2021	54	Disc.: Spacewatch	MPC · JPL
1	2003 WK211	MBA-M	18.6	570 m	multiple	2003–2019	22 Sep 2019	39	Disc.: Spacewatch	MPC · JPL
0	2003 WN211	MBA-M	18.6	570 m	multiple	2003–2015	16 Aug 2015	33	Disc.: Spacewatch	MPC · JPL
0	2003 WS211	MBA-I	19.14	440 m	multiple	2003–2021	03 Oct 2021	41	Disc.: Kitt Peak Obs.	MPC · JPL
1	2003 WT211	MBA-O	17.7	1.6 km	multiple	2003–2019	27 Jan 2019	33	Disc.: Spacewatch	MPC · JPL
0	2003 WX211	MBA-M	18.5	590 m	multiple	2003–2020	19 Jan 2020	76	Disc.: Kitt Peak Obs.	MPC · JPL
0	2003 WK212	MBA-M	18.31	920 m	multiple	2003–2022	26 Jan 2022	44	Disc.: Kitt Peak Obs.	MPC · JPL
0	2003 WS212 = (887273)	MBA-O	17.1	2.1 km	multiple	2003–2021	06 Jan 2021	44	Disc.: Kitt Peak Obs.	MPC · JPL
0	2003 WT212	MBA-O	17.9	1.5 km	multiple	2003–2019	28 Nov 2019	35	Disc.: Spacewatch	MPC · JPL
0	2003 WU212 = (887274)	MBA-O	16.7	2.5 km	multiple	2003–2021	04 Jan 2021	37	Disc.: Spacewatch	MPC · JPL
0	2003 WW212	MBA-M	18.19	1.3 km	multiple	2003–2021	11 Nov 2021	50	Disc.: Spacewatch	MPC · JPL
1	2003 WM213	MBA-I	19.1	450 m	multiple	2003–2020	25 Jan 2020	56	Disc.: LPL/Spacewatch II	MPC · JPL
0	2003 WO213	HIL	16.4	2.9 km	multiple	2003–2020	22 Jan 2020	59	Disc.: Spacewatch	MPC · JPL
0	2003 WP213	MBA-O	17.5	1.8 km	multiple	2003–2019	28 Nov 2019	41	Disc.: LPL/Spacewatch II	MPC · JPL
0	2003 WU213 = (887275)	MBA-O	16.9	2.3 km	multiple	2003–2021	07 Jan 2021	43	Disc.: Kitt Peak Obs.	MPC · JPL
0	2003 WW213	MBA-I	18.0	750 m	multiple	2003–2020	24 Jan 2020	35	Disc.: Spacewatch	MPC · JPL
0	2003 WB214	HUN	18.8	520 m	multiple	2003–2020	26 Jan 2020	37	Disc.: SDSS	MPC · JPL
2	2003 WD214	MBA-O	18.2	1.3 km	multiple	2003–2018	13 Dec 2018	33	Disc.: Kitt Peak Obs.	MPC · JPL
0	2003 WE214	MBA-O	17.4	1.8 km	multiple	2003–2019	28 Sep 2019	26	Disc.: Spacewatch	MPC · JPL
0	2003 WF214	MBA-O	17.2	2.0 km	multiple	2003–2020	16 Dec 2020	39	Disc.: Kitt Peak Obs.	MPC · JPL
0	2003 WG214	MBA-M	17.91	1.5 km	multiple	2003–2021	04 Oct 2021	63	Disc.: Kitt Peak Obs.	MPC · JPL
2	2003 WK214	MBA-O	17.9	1.5 km	multiple	2003–2019	03 Dec 2019	21	Disc.: SDSS	MPC · JPL
0	2003 WY214	HIL	16.6	2.7 km	multiple	1995–2018	18 Oct 2018	33	Disc.: Spacewatch; Added on 22 July 2020	MPC · JPL
1	2003 WT215	MBA-M	18.5	840 m	multiple	2003–2020	11 Oct 2020	40	Disc.: SDSS; Added on 19 October 2020	MPC · JPL
4	2003 WU215	MBA-M	18.6	1.1 km	multiple	2003–2017	21 Nov 2017	18	Disc.: LPL/Spacewatch II; Added on 19 October 2020	MPC · JPL
0	2003 WW215	MBA-M	18.3	920 m	multiple	2003–2020	12 Dec 2020	60	Disc.: Spacewatch; Added on 17 January 2021	MPC · JPL
0	2003 WY215	MBA-M	18.2	960 m	multiple	2003–2020	11 Oct 2020	53	Disc.: SDSS; Added on 17 January 2021	MPC · JPL
0	2003 WB216	MBA-M	18.1	1.0 km	multiple	2003–2020	16 Oct 2020	45	Disc.: Spacewatch; Added on 17 January 2021	MPC · JPL
0	2003 WG216	MBA-M	18.1	1.0 km	multiple	2003–2021	16 Jan 2021	79	Disc.: Spacewatch; Added on 17 January 2021	MPC · JPL
0	2003 WR216	MBA-O	17.1	2.1 km	multiple	2001–2021	07 Jan 2021	44	Disc.: Spacewatch; Added on 17 January 2021	MPC · JPL
0	2003 WU216	MBA-M	18.7	760 m	multiple	2003–2020	10 Dec 2020	34	Disc.: Spacewatch; Added on 17 January 2021	MPC · JPL
2	2003 WV216	MBA-O	18.1	1.3 km	multiple	2003–2020	07 Dec 2020	31	Disc.: Spacewatch; Added on 9 March 2021	MPC · JPL
0	2003 WW216	MBA-O	16.9	2.3 km	multiple	2003–2021	06 Jan 2021	32	Disc.: Spacewatch; Added on 9 March 2021	MPC · JPL
0	2003 WY216	MBA-I	19.39	390 m	multiple	1999–2021	13 Jul 2021	24	Disc.: Spacewatch; Added on 9 March 2021	MPC · JPL
0	2003 WG217	MBA-I	18.61	560 m	multiple	2003–2018	05 Oct 2018	35	Disc.: Spacewatch; Added on 21 August 2021	MPC · JPL
0	2003 WH217	MBA-I	18.97	480 m	multiple	2003–2022	10 Jan 2022	31	Disc.: Spacewatch; Added on 21 August 2021	MPC · JPL
0	2003 WJ217	MBA-I	18.6	570 m	multiple	2003–2020	27 Apr 2020	35	Disc.: Spacewatch; Added on 21 August 2021	MPC · JPL
0	2003 WP217	MBA-I	19.4	390 m	multiple	2003–2021	11 Feb 2021	34	Disc.: Spacewatch; Added on 5 November 2021	MPC · JPL
0	2003 WR217 = (887276)	MBA-I	18.94	480 m	multiple	2003–2021	29 Nov 2021	66	Disc.: Spacewatch; Added on 5 November 2021	MPC · JPL
0	2003 WS217	MBA-I	18.62	560 m	multiple	2003–2021	02 Dec 2021	70	Disc.: SDSS; Added on 24 December 2021	MPC · JPL
2	2003 WU217 = (887277)	MBA-I	19.1	450 m	multiple	2003–2021	09 Nov 2021	32	Disc.: Spacewatch; Added on 24 December 2021	MPC · JPL
3	2003 WW217	MBA-M	17.9	1.5 km	multiple	2003–2021	09 Dec 2021	25	Disc.: Spacewatch; Added on 24 December 2021	MPC · JPL
0	2003 WX217	MBA-O	17.2	2.0 km	multiple	2003–2021	16 Jan 2021	28	Disc.: Spacewatch; Added on 24 December 2021	MPC · JPL
2	2003 WY217	MBA-M	17.9	1.5 km	multiple	2003–2020	23 Aug 2020	26	Disc.: No observations Added on 29 January 2022	MPC · JPL

back to top
