= List of unnumbered minor planets: 2003 U (0–289) =

This is a partial list of unnumbered minor planets for principal provisional designations assigned during 16–31 October 2003. Since this period yielded a high number of provisional discoveries, it is further split into several standalone pages. As of November 2025, a total of 174 bodies remain unnumbered for this period. Objects for this year are listed on the following pages: A–E · F–G · H–L · M–R · S_{i} · S_{ii} · S_{iii} · S_{iv} · T · U_{i} · U_{ii} · U_{iii} · U_{iv} · V · W_{i} · W_{ii} and X–Y. Also see previous and next year.

Near-Earth obj.	MBA (inner)	MBA (outer)	Centaur
Mars-crosser	MBA (middle)	Jupiter trojan	Trans-Neptunian obj.
Unclassified

== U ==
U	Designation	Class	Physical		Observations				Description and notes	Ref
U	Designation	Class	H	D	Opp.	Arc	Last	Used	Description and notes	Ref
1	2003 UC	MCA	19.86	260 m	multiple	2003-2025	04 Apr 2025	50	—	MPC · JPL
0	2003 UE	AMO	20.32	310 m	multiple	2003–2021	29 Nov 2021	149	—	MPC · JPL
0	2003 UF	MBA-M	17.8	1.2 km	multiple	2003–2020	12 Dec 2020	173	—	MPC · JPL
0	2003 UM	MCA	18.4	620 m	multiple	2003–2020	22 Jun 2020	145	—	MPC · JPL
0	2003 UV1	MBA-M	19.0	670 m	multiple	2003–2020	08 Nov 2020	21	Disc.: LPL/Spacewatch II; Added on 17 June 2021	MPC · JPL
0	2003 UE2	MBA-O	18.4	1.2 km	multiple	2003–2019	03 Dec 2019	41	—	MPC · JPL
0	2003 UL2	MBA-I	19.03	460 m	multiple	2003–2022	06 Jan 2022	55	Alt.: 2017 QP53	MPC · JPL
1	2003 UG3	MBA-O	18.0	1.4 km	multiple	2003–2021	03 Jan 2021	45	Alt.: 2014 SP167	MPC · JPL
9	2003 UM3	APO	28.1	9 m	single	1 day	18 Oct 2003	12	—	MPC · JPL
0	2003 UQ3	AMO	19.6	430 m	multiple	2003–2020	07 Dec 2020	140	—	MPC · JPL
0	2003 UA4	MBA-I	19.0	470 m	multiple	2003–2018	11 Nov 2018	34	—	MPC · JPL
0	2003 UB5	AMO	19.59	430 m	multiple	2003–2021	17 Apr 2021	345	—	MPC · JPL
0	2003 UC5	APO	20.35	300 m	multiple	2003–2021	07 Nov 2021	99	—	MPC · JPL
1	2003 UD5	AMO	23.3	78 m	single	33 days	20 Nov 2003	110	—	MPC · JPL
0	2003 UJ5	MBA-M	18.25	1.2 km	multiple	2003–2021	16 Jul 2021	57	—	MPC · JPL
0	2003 UL5	HUN	19.9	310 m	multiple	2003–2018	17 May 2018	21	—	MPC · JPL
2	2003 UQ5	MBA-M	17.5	1.8 km	multiple	2003–2014	05 Mar 2014	32	Alt.: 2014 EL75	MPC · JPL
0	2003 UR5	MCA	19.3	580 m	multiple	2003–2020	15 Dec 2020	77	—	MPC · JPL
6	2003 UW5	AMO	24.3	49 m	single	44 days	01 Dec 2003	53	—	MPC · JPL
0	2003 UX5	APO	20.29	310 m	multiple	2003–2023	19 Mar 2023	276	Potentially hazardous object	MPC · JPL
0	2003 UD6	MBA-M	17.9	1.1 km	multiple	2003–2019	28 May 2019	25	—	MPC · JPL
0	2003 UE6	HUN	20.12	280 m	multiple	2003–2021	27 Jun 2021	22	Disc.: Spacewatch; Added on 22 July 2020	MPC · JPL
1	2003 UG7	MCA	16.9	1.2 km	multiple	2003–2021	03 Jan 2021	79	—	MPC · JPL
2	2003 UZ7	MCA	20.9	280 m	multiple	2003–2016	02 Nov 2016	33	Alt.: 2016 TG18	MPC · JPL
6	2003 UE8	AMO	24.9	37 m	single	43 days	30 Nov 2003	36	—	MPC · JPL
0	2003 UF8	MBA-M	18.4	880 m	multiple	2003–2021	07 Jan 2021	73	—	MPC · JPL
7	2003 UL9	APO	22.4	120 m	single	6 days	25 Oct 2003	24	—	MPC · JPL
2	2003 US9	MCA	18.5	590 m	multiple	2003–2016	13 Mar 2016	82	—	MPC · JPL
8	2003 UC10	APO	23.9	59 m	single	13 days	02 Nov 2003	29	—	MPC · JPL
0	2003 UO12	APO	23.9	59 m	multiple	2003–2018	20 Feb 2018	195	Alt.: 2018 AX11	MPC · JPL
7	2003 UP12	APO	25.5	28 m	single	5 days	26 Oct 2003	37	—	MPC · JPL
7	2003 UQ12	APO	24.9	37 m	single	9 days	30 Oct 2003	40	—	MPC · JPL
1	2003 UY12	ATE	22.9	93 m	multiple	2003–2016	13 Nov 2016	84	Alt.: 2003 US12, 2013 UT8	MPC · JPL
0	2003 UC13	MBA-M	17.90	1.1 km	multiple	2003–2022	27 Jan 2022	62	—	MPC · JPL
0	2003 UZ14	MBA-O	17.43	1.1 km	multiple	2003-2022	17 Sep 2022	48	—	MPC · JPL
2	2003 UL15	MBA-O	17.65	1.5 km	multiple	2003-2020	30 May 2020	46	—	MPC · JPL
0	2003 UV15	MCA	18.3	650 m	multiple	2003–2011	01 Aug 2011	49	—	MPC · JPL
2	2003 UA17	MBA-O	17.7	1.6 km	multiple	2003–2020	15 Oct 2020	32	Disc.: Spacewatch; Added on 17 January 2021	MPC · JPL
1	2003 UC17	MBA-M	18.3	650 m	multiple	2003–2019	17 Nov 2019	27	—	MPC · JPL
1	2003 UQ17	MBA-O	18.2	1.3 km	multiple	2003–2019	24 Oct 2019	31	Disc.: Spacewatch; Added on 22 July 2020; Alt.: 2014 VH29	MPC · JPL
0	2003 US17	MBA-O	17.0	2.2 km	multiple	2003–2021	09 Jan 2021	37	Disc.: Spacewatch; Added on 22 July 2020	MPC · JPL
0	2003 UK18	MBA-I	19.4	390 m	multiple	2003–2020	23 Nov 2020	40	Disc.: Spacewatch; Added on 17 January 2021	MPC · JPL
0	2003 UW18	MBA-M	17.9	1.5 km	multiple	2001–2017	25 Oct 2017	37	—	MPC · JPL
1	2003 UX18	MBA-I	19.66	390 m	multiple	2003-2025	23 Sep 2025	44	—	MPC · JPL
1	2003 UY19	AMO	18.6	680 m	multiple	2003–2008	16 Jan 2008	122	—	MPC · JPL
1	2003 UA21	MCA	19.0	880 m	multiple	2003–2017	17 Nov 2017	32	—	MPC · JPL
8	2003 UB22	APO	24.3	49 m	single	7 days	28 Oct 2003	35	—	MPC · JPL
0	2003 UC22	AMO	22.03	140 m	multiple	2003-2022	19 Nov 2022	88	—	MPC · JPL
7	2003 UE22	AMO	24.7	41 m	single	13 days	05 Nov 2003	47	—	MPC · JPL
1	2003 UG22	APO	21.2	200 m	multiple	2003–2020	22 Nov 2020	162	—	MPC · JPL
0	2003 UL22	MBA-M	18.4	1.2 km	multiple	2003–2021	09 Sep 2021	54	Alt.: 2021 PB64	MPC · JPL
1	2003 UM22	MBA-O	17.18	2.0 km	multiple	2003–2021	27 Nov 2021	30	—	MPC · JPL
0	2003 UP24	AMO	20.1	340 m	multiple	2003–2013	08 Nov 2013	95	—	MPC · JPL
9	2003 US24	MBA-I	20.1	280 m	single	1 day	25 Oct 2003	9	—	MPC · JPL
–	2003 UT24	MCA	20.2	270 m	single	20 days	25 Oct 2003	23	—	MPC · JPL
4	2003 UO25	APO	22.6	110 m	multiple	2003–2005	28 Oct 2005	54	—	MPC · JPL
7	2003 UP25	AMO	23.3	78 m	single	12 days	05 Nov 2003	56	—	MPC · JPL
7	2003 UQ25	APO	24.1	54 m	single	11 days	04 Nov 2003	57	—	MPC · JPL
8	2003 UR25	APO	25.5	28 m	single	0 day	25 Oct 2003	18	—	MPC · JPL
0	2003 UW26	AMO	19.18	520 m	multiple	2003–2021	01 Dec 2021	156	—	MPC · JPL
7	2003 UX26	APO	24.5	45 m	single	8 days	01 Nov 2003	68	—	MPC · JPL
0	2003 UZ26	MBA-O	16.6	2.7 km	multiple	2003–2020	16 Nov 2020	60	Disc.: LPL/Spacewatch II; Added on 17 January 2021; Alt.: 2010 CK207	MPC · JPL
0	2003 UY27	MCA	17.7	1.2 km	multiple	2003–2021	12 Jan 2021	381	Alt.: 2003 XB	MPC · JPL
1	2003 UE30	MBA-M	17.9	780 m	multiple	2003–2015	10 Sep 2015	21	Disc.: Spacewatch; Added on 29 January 2022	MPC · JPL
1	2003 UO30	MBA-I	18.9	490 m	multiple	2003–2018	16 Sep 2018	24	—	MPC · JPL
2	2003 UX30	MBA-I	19.2	430 m	multiple	2003–2020	05 Nov 2020	42	Disc.: Spacewatch; Added on 17 January 2021	MPC · JPL
0	2003 UB31	MBA-M	18.00	1.4 km	multiple	2003–2021	11 Sep 2021	35	Disc.: Spacewatch; Added on 21 August 2021	MPC · JPL
0	2003 UD31	MBA-I	19.1	450 m	multiple	2003–2021	08 Jun 2021	30	—	MPC · JPL
1	2003 UF31	MBA-M	18.62	1.1 km	multiple	2003–2021	06 Nov 2021	45	Disc.: Spacewatch; Added on 5 November 2021; Alt.: 2012 VX10, 2021 RV78	MPC · JPL
2	2003 UM31	MBA-O	18.0	1.4 km	multiple	2003–2019	27 Sep 2019	21	Disc.: Spacewatch; Added on 21 August 2021	MPC · JPL
1	2003 UP32	MBA-O	17.6	1.7 km	multiple	2003–2019	19 Nov 2019	40	Alt.: 2019 TU31	MPC · JPL
0	2003 UU33	MBA-M	18.29	1.2 km	multiple	2003–2021	04 Oct 2021	43	—	MPC · JPL
1	2003 UY33	MBA-I	19.1	450 m	multiple	2003–2020	23 Jan 2020	42	Alt.: 2006 QO147	MPC · JPL
0	2003 UP35	MBA-M	18.3	920 m	multiple	2003–2021	11 Jan 2021	109	—	MPC · JPL
0	2003 UH38	MBA-I	18.12	710 m	multiple	2003–2021	26 Nov 2021	34	Disc.: LPL/Spacewatch II; Added on 5 November 2021	MPC · JPL
1	2003 UC39	MBA-O	17.61	1.2 km	multiple	2003-2025	25 Sep 2025	43	—	MPC · JPL
0	2003 UZ39	HIL	16.9	2.3 km	multiple	2003–2019	24 Dec 2019	46	Alt.: 2011 WC35	MPC · JPL
0	2003 UK41	HIL	16.6	2.7 km	multiple	2003–2021	07 Jan 2021	87	Alt.: 2011 UN100	MPC · JPL
3	2003 UQ41	MBA-M	18.8	730 m	multiple	2003–2016	04 Oct 2016	21	—	MPC · JPL
2	2003 UT41	MBA-I	18.3	650 m	multiple	2003–2017	18 May 2017	27	Alt.: 2014 SV311	MPC · JPL
3	2003 UY41	MBA-I	18.8	520 m	multiple	2003–2014	25 Oct 2014	39	Alt.: 2014 UV99	MPC · JPL MPC · JPL
0	2003 UB42	MBA-M	18.1	1.0 km	multiple	2003–2020	11 Oct 2020	38	—	MPC · JPL
0	2003 UZ42	MBA-M	18.69	700 m	multiple	2003- 2025	29 Oct 2025	57	—	MPC · JPL
0	2003 US43	MBA-M	18.7	540 m	multiple	2003–2019	27 Oct 2019	77	Alt.: 2011 UY174	MPC · JPL
0	2003 UW43	MBA-M	18.3	650 m	multiple	2003–2020	14 Dec 2020	28	—	MPC · JPL
0	2003 UD45	MBA-M	17.7	1.6 km	multiple	2003–2019	16 Jan 2019	31	Disc.: Spacewatch; Added on 21 August 2021	MPC · JPL
0	2003 UG45	MBA-M	17.8	820 m	multiple	1999–2019	30 Jun 2019	36	—	MPC · JPL
0	2003 UH45	MBA-M	17.88	1.5 km	multiple	2003–2021	01 Oct 2021	37	Disc.: Spacewatch; Added on 30 September 2021	MPC · JPL
0	2003 UK45	MBA-M	18.9	700 m	multiple	2003–2020	23 Oct 2020	36	Disc.: Spacewatch; Added on 17 January 2021	MPC · JPL
0	2003 UL45	MBA-M	18.7	760 m	multiple	2003–2020	05 Nov 2020	48	—	MPC · JPL
–	2003 UY45	MBA-M	19.2	430 m	single	8 days	26 Oct 2003	9	—	MPC · JPL
0	2003 UH46	MBA-I	18.8	520 m	multiple	2003–2012	21 Mar 2012	23	Disc.: Spacewatch; Added on 22 July 2020; Alt.: 2005 JC13	MPC · JPL
1	2003 UM46	MBA-I	19.0	470 m	multiple	2003–2017	21 Oct 2017	50	Alt.: 2010 TA92	MPC · JPL
0	2003 UB48	MBA-M	18.16	1.3 km	multiple	2003–2021	27 Nov 2021	126	Alt.: 2012 TA175	MPC · JPL
7	2003 UT55	ATE	26.8	16 m	single	0 day	27 Oct 2003	22	—	MPC · JPL
0	2003 UJ58	MBA-O	16.8	2.4 km	multiple	2003–2021	06 Jan 2021	89	—	MPC · JPL
1	2003 UL67	MBA-I	19.0	470 m	multiple	2003–2020	15 Aug 2020	34	Disc.: LPL/Spacewatch II; Added on 22 July 2020; Alt.: 2010 UC9	MPC · JPL
1	2003 UR67	MBA-O	18.1	1.3 km	multiple	2003–2019	26 Sep 2019	37	—	MPC · JPL
1	2003 UE68	MBA-M	18.16	1.3 km	multiple	2003–2021	10 Jul 2021	42	—	MPC · JPL
2	2003 UV68	MBA-O	17.4	1.8 km	multiple	2003–2020	11 Nov 2020	42	Disc.: Spacewatch; Added on 17 January 2021	MPC · JPL
0	2003 UD70	MBA-M	18.7	760 m	multiple	2003–2020	14 Dec 2020	56	—	MPC · JPL
0	2003 UK70	MBA-M	18.1	710 m	multiple	2003–2020	11 Dec 2020	26	Disc.: Spacewatch; Added on 9 March 2021; Alt.: 2020 UT34	MPC · JPL
1	2003 UP70	MBA-I	19.1	450 m	multiple	2003–2017	20 Nov 2017	36	Alt.: 2010 SJ6	MPC · JPL
0	2003 UO79	MBA-O	17.38	2.1 km	multiple	2003–2021	12 Jan 2021	114	Alt.: 2020 SG8	MPC · JPL
0	2003 UK84	MBA-I	18.7	540 m	multiple	2002–2019	02 Jan 2019	69	—	MPC · JPL
2	2003 UY84	MBA-M	18.6	800 m	multiple	2003–2020	17 Nov 2020	130	Disc.: LPL/Spacewatch II; Added on 17 January 2021	MPC · JPL
0	2003 UD87	MBA-O	17.27	2.0 km	multiple	2003–2021	11 Nov 2021	78	Alt.: 2010 BP104	MPC · JPL
2	2003 UR89	MBA-M	18.1	1.3 km	multiple	2003–2021	25 Nov 2021	31	Disc.: LPL/Spacewatch II; Added on 24 December 2021	MPC · JPL
0	2003 UF90	MBA-O	17.1	2.1 km	multiple	1992–2019	27 Oct 2019	49	—	MPC · JPL
2	2003 UW91	MBA-O	17.2	2.0 km	multiple	2003–2020	05 Nov 2020	49	Alt.: 2014 QX436	MPC · JPL
1	2003 UQ97	MCA	19.1	450 m	multiple	2003–2013	29 Sep 2013	40	Alt.: 2013 QZ15	MPC · JPL
0	2003 UX111	MBA-M	17.53	1.7 km	multiple	2003–2021	05 Nov 2021	68	Disc.: NEAT; Added on 30 September 2021	MPC · JPL
0	2003 UF115	MBA-M	18.2	960 m	multiple	2003–2020	08 Dec 2020	73	—	MPC · JPL
0	2003 UH115	MBA-O	18.0	1.4 km	multiple	2003–2018	14 Aug 2018	33	Alt.: 2008 TO150	MPC · JPL
2	2003 UM117	MBA-M	17.7	1.2 km	multiple	2003–2020	31 May 2020	47	—	MPC · JPL
0	2003 UP120	MBA-I	18.2	680 m	multiple	2003–2018	11 Aug 2018	28	Alt.: 2007 WW18	MPC · JPL
0	2003 UR120	MBA-O	17.4	1.8 km	multiple	2003–2019	27 Nov 2019	89	—	MPC · JPL
0	2003 UH123	MBA-O	17.0	2.2 km	multiple	2003–2020	17 Nov 2020	50	Disc.: Spacewatch; Added on 17 January 2021	MPC · JPL
0	2003 UX123	MBA-M	18.0	750 m	multiple	2003–2021	11 Jan 2021	51	—	MPC · JPL
0	2003 US125	MBA-M	17.5	940 m	multiple	1999–2019	28 Jun 2019	38	Alt.: 2015 TJ338	MPC · JPL
0	2003 US153	MBA-M	18.6	1.1 km	multiple	2003–2021	09 Nov 2021	47	Disc.: LPL/Spacewatch II; Added on 24 December 2021	MPC · JPL
–	2003 UP154	MBA-O	18.6	1.1 km	single	19 days	24 Oct 2003	12	—	MPC · JPL
0	2003 UL155	MBA-I	18.77	520 m	multiple	2003–2021	08 Dec 2021	72	Alt.: 2010 HF138	MPC · JPL
1	2003 UL156	MBA-I	19.03	410 m	multiple	2003-2022	21 Jul 2022	26	—	MPC · JPL
0	2003 UA158	MBA-I	18.8	520 m	multiple	2003–2020	23 Aug 2020	28	Disc.: Spacewatch; Added on 21 August 2021	MPC · JPL
0	2003 UJ165	MBA-M	17.9	1.1 km	multiple	2003–2020	17 Dec 2020	59	—	MPC · JPL
2	2003 UZ165	MBA-M	18.4	880 m	multiple	2003–2016	01 Nov 2016	42	—	MPC · JPL
0	2003 UH166	MBA-I	18.73	530 m	multiple	2003–2021	09 Nov 2021	63	Disc.: Spacewatch; Added on 22 July 2020; Alt.: 2010 QQ	MPC · JPL
0	2003 UV172	MBA-M	18.4	880 m	multiple	2003–2020	16 Oct 2020	28	Disc.: Spacewatch; Added on 9 March 2021	MPC · JPL
1	2003 UY172	MCA	19.71	350 m	multiple	2003-2023	24 Aug 2023	27	—	MPC · JPL
1	2003 UW176	MBA-M	18.3	920 m	multiple	2003–2020	16 Dec 2020	34	Disc.: LONEOS; Added on 9 March 2021	MPC · JPL
0	2003 UL189	MBA-M	17.64	1.2 km	multiple	2003–2021	01 Dec 2021	35	—	MPC · JPL
1	2003 UC191	MBA-M	18.6	570 m	multiple	2003–2019	28 Jul 2019	50	Alt.: 2007 TM291	MPC · JPL
1	2003 UM204	MCA	19.3	410 m	multiple	2003–2019	28 Aug 2019	52	Alt.: 2016 WP4	MPC · JPL
0	2003 UA209	MBA-M	19.00	880 m	multiple	2003–2021	09 Nov 2021	90	Alt.: 2012 TE117	MPC · JPL
0	2003 UN210	HUN	18.87	500 m	multiple	2003–2021	11 May 2021	48	Alt.: 2011 UZ116	MPC · JPL
1	2003 UP211	MCA	19.4	390 m	multiple	2003–2019	12 Jan 2019	38	—	MPC · JPL
0	2003 UE214	MCA	19.5	370 m	multiple	2003–2016	05 Jun 2016	41	Alt.: 2013 TV1	MPC · JPL
0	2003 UG214	MBA-I	18.94	480 m	multiple	2003–2021	09 Nov 2021	64	Disc.: LINEAR; Added on 22 July 2020; Alt.: 2014 WJ406	MPC · JPL
3	2003 UU220	MBA-O	17.3	1.9 km	multiple	2003–2021	06 Jan 2021	50	Disc.: Spacewatch; Added on 9 March 2021	MPC · JPL
0	2003 UP228	MBA-I	18.5	590 m	multiple	2003–2019	01 Nov 2019	114	—	MPC · JPL
0	2003 UM230	MBA-M	18.3	920 m	multiple	2003–2021	06 Jan 2021	72	Disc.: Spacewatch; Added on 17 January 2021	MPC · JPL
0	2003 UC235	MBA-O	17.3	1.9 km	multiple	2003–2020	12 Dec 2020	65	Alt.: 2014 QY294	MPC · JPL
1	2003 UL235	MBA-I	19.3	410 m	multiple	2003–2017	23 Oct 2017	37	—	MPC · JPL
0	2003 UN244	MBA-M	17.2	2.0 km	multiple	2003–2018	14 Jan 2018	54	—	MPC · JPL
0	2003 UH250	MBA-M	17.54	1.7 km	multiple	2003–2021	30 Oct 2021	62	—	MPC · JPL
0	2003 UF251	MBA-I	19.21	430 m	multiple	2003–2021	02 Oct 2021	63	—	MPC · JPL
2	2003 UV251	MBA-O	17.3	1.9 km	multiple	2003–2019	19 Sep 2019	26	—	MPC · JPL
0	2003 UC253	MBA-M	18.1	1.3 km	multiple	2003–2017	24 Oct 2017	40	—	MPC · JPL
0	2003 UR261	MBA-M	17.58	1.7 km	multiple	2003–2021	09 Aug 2021	76	—	MPC · JPL
2	2003 UW281	MBA-M	17.9	1.5 km	multiple	2003–2021	07 Oct 2021	66	—	MPC · JPL
–	2003 UY283	TNO	15.3	5.0 km	single	32 days	19 Nov 2003	44	LoUTNOs, centaur	MPC · JPL
0	2003 UC285	MBA-I	19.1	450 m	multiple	2003–2019	19 Sep 2019	44	—	MPC · JPL
0	2003 UJ285	MBA-I	19.7	340 m	multiple	2003–2019	29 Sep 2019	16	Disc.: Kitt Peak Obs. Added on 30 September 2021	MPC · JPL
0	2003 UB286	MBA-O	17.6	1.7 km	multiple	2000–2019	21 Sep 2019	29	Disc.: Kitt Peak Obs. Added on 21 August 2021	MPC · JPL
3	2003 UD286	MBA-O	18.2	1.3 km	multiple	2003–2019	28 Oct 2019	22	—	MPC · JPL
1	2003 UO286	MBA-M	18.2	680 m	multiple	2003–2019	08 Aug 2019	32	—	MPC · JPL
0	2003 UX286	MBA-O	17.23	2.0 km	multiple	2003–2022	26 Jan 2022	35	Disc.: Kitt Peak Obs. Added on 17 January 2021	MPC · JPL
0	2003 UZ286	MBA-O	17.5	1.8 km	multiple	2003–2020	10 Nov 2020	27	Disc.: Kitt Peak Obs. Added on 17 January 2021	MPC · JPL
0	2003 UG287	MBA-I	18.7	540 m	multiple	2003–2016	21 Oct 2016	43	—	MPC · JPL
0	2003 UP288	MBA-M	18.09	1.3 km	multiple	2003–2019	15 Jan 2019	39	—	MPC · JPL
0	2003 UR288	MBA-I	18.98	430 m	multiple	2003-2022	25 Dec 2022	72	—	MPC · JPL
0	2003 UM289 = (887250)	MBA-M	17.8	820 m	multiple	2003–2018	19 May 2018	32	—	MPC · JPL
0	2003 UQ289	MBA-I	19.07	460 m	multiple	1999–2021	10 Apr 2021	39	—	MPC · JPL

back to top
