= List of unnumbered minor planets: 2003 T =

This is a partial list of unnumbered minor planets for principal provisional designations assigned during 1–15 October 2003. As of April 2026, a total of 91 bodies remain unnumbered for this period. Objects for this year are listed on the following pages: A–E · F–G · H–L · M–R · S_{i} · S_{ii} · S_{iii} · S_{iv} · T · U_{i} · U_{ii} · U_{iii} · U_{iv} · V · W_{i} · W_{ii} and X–Y. Also see previous and next year.

Near-Earth obj.	MBA (inner)	MBA (outer)	Centaur
Mars-crosser	MBA (middle)	Jupiter trojan	Trans-Neptunian obj.
Unclassified

== T ==
U	Designation	Class	Physical		Observations				Description and notes	Ref
U	Designation	Class	H	D	Opp.	Arc	Last	Used	Description and notes	Ref
0	2003 TG	AMO	20.57	220 m	multiple	2003-2026	06 May 2026	55	Disc.: Spacewatch	MPC · JPL
1	2003 TO	MCA	18.61	570 m	multiple	2003-2024	03 Nov 2024	26	Disc.: Spacewatch; Alt.: 2024 VM	MPC · JPL
1	2003 TK1	AMO	24.3	49 m	multiple	2003–2018	12 Nov 2018	84	Disc.: Spacewatch	MPC · JPL
5	2003 TL1	AMO	19.9	370 m	single	84 days	13 Dec 2003	113	Disc.: LINEAR	MPC · JPL
0	2003 TM1	APO	22.1	140 m	multiple	2003–2016	09 Feb 2016	78	Disc.: LINEAR	MPC · JPL
0	2003 TG2	ATE	21.2	200 m	multiple	2003–2016	10 Oct 2016	56	Disc.: LPL/Spacewatch II	MPC · JPL
7	2003 TH2	APO	22.8	98 m	single	25 days	30 Oct 2003	179	Disc.: Spacewatch	MPC · JPL
0	2003 TK2	APO	19.7	410 m	multiple	2003–2021	28 Nov 2021	135	Disc.: LINEAR; Potentially hazardous object	MPC · JPL
0	2003 TV2	MBA-I	18.63	560 m	multiple	2003–2021	28 Sep 2021	48	Disc.: Spacewatch; Added on 21 August 2021; Alt.: 2014 UJ6	MPC · JPL
1	2003 TW2	MBA-I	19.2	430 m	multiple	2003–2019	03 Sep 2019	44	Disc.: Spacewatch	MPC · JPL
0	2003 TF4	MBA-M	18.8	730 m	multiple	2003–2020	17 Nov 2020	38	Disc.: LPL/Spacewatch II; Added on 17 January 2021	MPC · JPL
0	2003 TQ5	MBA-O	17.3	1.9 km	multiple	2003–2019	21 Oct 2019	32	Disc.: LPL/Spacewatch II	MPC · JPL
2	2003 TB6	MCA	19.38	360 m	multiple	2003-2024	07 Dec 2024	26	Disc.: LONEOS; Alt.: 2024 TZ82	MPC · JPL
0	2003 TO9	APO	21.9	150 m	multiple	2003–2018	10 Aug 2018	181	Disc.: LONEOS; Potentially hazardous object	MPC · JPL
0	2003 TR9	APO	21.3	200 m	multiple	2003–2020	23 Mar 2020	53	Disc.: LONEOS; Potentially hazardous object	MPC · JPL
0	2003 TT9	APO	22.69	93 m	multipgle	2003-2026	07 Oct 2026	75	Disc.: LONEOS	MPC · JPL
0	2003 TX9	AMO	20.56	230 m	multiple	2003–20236	01 Mar 2023	108	Disc.: NEAT	MPC · JPL
1	2003 TM10	MBA-I	18.9	490 m	multiple	2003–2020	15 Dec 2020	45	Disc.: Table Mountain Obs.	MPC · JPL
0	2003 TG17	MBA-M	18.2	960 m	multiple	2003–2021	03 Jan 2021	56	Disc.: LONEOS	MPC · JPL
0	2003 TV21	MBA-O	17.39	2.8 km	multiple	2003–2022	07 Jan 2022	93	Disc.: Spacewatch	MPC · JPL
0	2003 TD22	MBA-M	18.4	880 m	multiple	2003–2020	07 Oct 2020	64	Disc.: Spacewatch	MPC · JPL
0	2003 TF23	MBA-I	19.0	470 m	multiple	2003–2018	30 Sep 2018	31	Disc.: Spacewatch; Added on 29 January 2022	MPC · JPL
0	2003 TY24	MBA-M	17.6	1.7 km	multiple	2003–2017	22 Oct 2017	27	Disc.: Spacewatch	MPC · JPL
3	2003 TG25	MBA-M	19.0	670 m	multiple	2003–2016	26 Oct 2016	38	Disc.: Spacewatch	MPC · JPL
0	2003 TC26	MBA-M	18.38	1.2 km	multiple	2003–2021	04 Oct 2021	39	Disc.: Spacewatch; Added on 21 August 2021	MPC · JPL
0	2003 TD26	MBA-M	18.1	1.3 km	multiple	2003–2017	19 Nov 2017	47	Disc.: Spacewatch; Alt.: 2017 RC21	MPC · JPL
0	2003 TC27	MBA-I	18.5	590 m	multiple	2003–2018	15 Oct 2018	30	Disc.: Spacewatch	MPC · JPL
0	2003 TK27	MBA-I	19.09	450 m	multiple	2003–2021	08 Nov 2021	58	Disc.: Spacewatch; Alt.: 2014 WX437	MPC · JPL
0	2003 TZ27	MBA-I	18.9	490 m	multiple	2003–2019	22 Oct 2019	48	Disc.: Spacewatch	MPC · JPL
0	2003 TA28	MBA-I	18.5	590 m	multiple	2003–2019	02 Jun 2019	31	Disc.: Spacewatch; Added on 22 July 2020	MPC · JPL
0	2003 TF28	MBA-I	19.34	400 m	multiple	2003–2021	29 Nov 2021	36	Disc.: Spacewatch; Added on 22 July 2020	MPC · JPL
1	2003 TV28	MBA-I	19.1	450 m	multiple	1996–2017	23 Oct 2017	36	Disc.: Spacewatch; Alt.: 1996 TF44, 2010 RD186	MPC · JPL
0	2003 TK29	MBA-I	18.7	540 m	multiple	2003–2018	06 Oct 2018	38	Disc.: Spacewatch	MPC · JPL
0	2003 TQ29	MBA-O	17.3	1.9 km	multiple	2003–2019	01 Nov 2019	34	Disc.: Spacewatch	MPC · JPL
2	2003 TF31 = (887249)	MBA-O	17.5	1.8 km	multiple	2003–2019	29 Sep 2019	33	Disc.: Spacewatch; Added on 22 July 2020; Alt.: 2014 UC82	MPC · JPL
0	2003 TM31	MBA-I	19.20	430 m	multiple	1999–2021	09 May 2021	47	Disc.: Spacewatch	MPC · JPL
0	2003 TT31	MBA-M	17.88	1.5 km	multiple	2003–2021	07 Sep 2021	41	Disc.: Spacewatch; Alt.: 2008 XH32	MPC · JPL
0	2003 TV31	MBA-M	18.7	760 m	multiple	2003–2020	24 Oct 2020	38	Disc.: Spacewatch; Added on 17 January 2021; Alt.: 2007 PO48	MPC · JPL
0	2003 TW35	MBA-M	18.13	1.3 km	multiple	2003–2021	08 Sep 2021	65	Disc.: Spacewatch	MPC · JPL
1	2003 TD36	MBA-O	17.5	1.8 km	multiple	2003–2020	06 Dec 2020	58	Disc.: Spacewatch; Added on 17 January 2021	MPC · JPL
2	2003 TU36	MBA-M	18.5	840 m	multiple	2003–2020	05 Nov 2020	50	Disc.: Spacewatch; Added on 17 January 2021	MPC · JPL
0	2003 TA37	MBA-O	17.2	2.0 km	multiple	2003–2020	07 Oct 2020	48	Disc.: Spacewatch; Alt.: 2015 XH84	MPC · JPL
0	2003 TC37	MBA-M	18.3	920 m	multiple	2003–2020	14 Oct 2020	66	Disc.: Spacewatch	MPC · JPL
0	2003 TG38	MBA-M	18.4	880 m	multiple	2003–2020	16 Oct 2020	43	Disc.: Spacewatch; Added on 17 January 2021	MPC · JPL
0	2003 TW38	MBA-M	18.1	710 m	multiple	2003–2019	19 Sep 2019	37	Disc.: Spacewatch; Added on 21 August 2021	MPC · JPL
1	2003 TZ38	MBA-M	18.2	680 m	multiple	2003–2015	11 Jul 2015	25	Disc.: Spacewatch	MPC · JPL
0	2003 TS39	MBA-I	18.43	610 m	multiple	2003–2021	30 Oct 2021	59	Disc.: Spacewatch; Added on 21 August 2021	MPC · JPL
0	2003 TC40	MBA-M	16.6	1.4 km	multiple	1999–2021	11 Jan 2021	153	Disc.: Spacewatch	MPC · JPL
2	2003 TM40	MBA-I	19.6	360 m	multiple	2003–2006	26 Sep 2006	18	Disc.: Spacewatch; Alt.: 2006 QK180	MPC · JPL
0	2003 TS40	MBA-O	18.0	1.4 km	multiple	2003–2018	15 Dec 2018	29	Disc.: Spacewatch; Alt.: 2013 WQ97	MPC · JPL
0	2003 TV40	MBA-I	18.74	530 m	multiple	2003–2021	05 Dec 2021	50	Disc.: Spacewatch	MPC · JPL
1	2003 TX40	MBA-O	17.0	2.2 km	multiple	2003–2019	24 Aug 2019	40	Disc.: Spacewatch; Alt.: 2014 SH317	MPC · JPL
1	2003 TR41	MBA-I	18.5	590 m	multiple	2003–2018	11 Jul 2018	22	Disc.: Spacewatch	MPC · JPL
0	2003 TY41	MBA-M	18.4	880 m	multiple	2003–2020	14 Dec 2020	48	Disc.: Spacewatch; Added on 17 January 2021	MPC · JPL
0	2003 TT42	MBA-M	17.55	1.7 km	multiple	2003–2021	06 Nov 2021	57	Disc.: LPL/Spacewatch II	MPC · JPL
0	2003 TR45	MBA-M	18.5	1.1 km	multiple	2003–2021	26 Oct 2021	58	Disc.: Spacewatch; Added on 24 December 2021	MPC · JPL
0	2003 TX48	MBA-M	18.04	1.4 km	multiple	2003–2021	30 Nov 2021	88	Disc.: Spacewatch; Added on 5 November 2021; Alt.: 2012 UT146, 2021 RR100	MPC · JPL
0	2003 TU53	MBA-I	18.6	570 m	multiple	2003–2018	12 Nov 2018	60	Disc.: Spacewatch; Alt.: 2014 SQ234	MPC · JPL
1	2003 TW53	MBA-I	19.2	430 m	multiple	2003–2016	05 Jul 2016	28	Disc.: Spacewatch	MPC · JPL
3	2003 TJ58	TNO	7.51	65 km	multiple	2003–2020	09 Dec 2020	55	Disc.: Mauna Kea Obs. LoUTNOs, cubewano (cold), albedo: 0.285; binary: 51 km	MPC · JPL
4	2003 TK58	TNO	6.8	145 km	multiple	2003–2015	18 Feb 2015	26	Disc.: Mauna Kea Obs. LoUTNOs, cubewano (cold)	MPC · JPL
3	2003 TL58	TNO	7.0	204 km	multiple	2003–2019	08 Feb 2019	19	Disc.: Mauna Kea Obs. LoUTNOs, cubewano (hot)	MPC · JPL
1	2003 TW61	MBA-I	19.0	470 m	multiple	2003–2017	21 Nov 2017	35	Disc.: Spacewatch	MPC · JPL
1	2003 TK62	MBA-O	17.5	1.8 km	multiple	2003–2016	14 Feb 2016	25	Disc.: Spacewatch	MPC · JPL
0	2003 TL62	MBA-M	17.3	1.9 km	multiple	2003–2020	16 Mar 2020	36	Disc.: Spacewatch	MPC · JPL
0	2003 TR62	MBA-O	15.8	3.9 km	multiple	2003–2020	01 Jan 2020	97	Disc.: Spacewatch; Alt.: 2010 HE69	MPC · JPL
0	2003 TJ63	MBA-I	19.0	470 m	multiple	2003–2019	02 Nov 2019	41	Disc.: Spacewatch	MPC · JPL
0	2003 TK63	MBA-I	18.8	520 m	multiple	2003–2019	05 Aug 2019	41	Disc.: Spacewatch	MPC · JPL
0	2003 TA64	HUN	18.51	590 m	multiple	2003–2021	09 Apr 2021	60	Disc.: Spacewatch	MPC · JPL
0	2003 TD64	MBA-O	16.4	2.9 km	multiple	2003–2020	06 Dec 2020	126	Disc.: Spacewatch; Alt.: 2010 CX17	MPC · JPL
0	2003 TE64	MBA-I	18.7	540 m	multiple	2003–2019	28 May 2019	30	Disc.: LONEOS	MPC · JPL
0	2003 TG64	MBA-I	19.3	410 m	multiple	2003–2019	29 Jul 2019	54	Disc.: Spacewatch	MPC · JPL
0	2003 TK64	MBA-I	19.0	470 m	multiple	2003–2019	20 Sep 2019	42	Disc.: Spacewatch	MPC · JPL
1	2003 TM64	MBA-M	18.1	710 m	multiple	2003–2019	29 Oct 2019	40	Disc.: Spacewatch	MPC · JPL
3	2003 TO64	MBA-M	18.2	1.3 km	multiple	2003–2017	28 Oct 2017	20	Disc.: Spacewatch	MPC · JPL
0	2003 TS64	MBA-O	17.4	1.8 km	multiple	2003–2019	26 Nov 2019	45	Disc.: LPL/Spacewatch II	MPC · JPL
0	2003 TU64	MBA-O	17.6	1.7 km	multiple	2003–2021	15 Jan 2021	75	Disc.: Spacewatch; Alt.: 2010 GW70	MPC · JPL
0	2003 TY64	MBA-I	19.0	470 m	multiple	2003–2020	17 Nov 2020	54	Disc.: Spacewatch; Added on 22 July 2020	MPC · JPL
0	2003 TB65	MBA-M	18.8	730 m	multiple	2003–2020	23 Sep 2020	48	Disc.: Spacewatch; Added on 19 October 2020	MPC · JPL
1	2003 TF65	MCA	19.6	360 m	multiple	2003–2020	21 Sep 2020	34	Disc.: Spacewatch; Added on 17 January 2021	MPC · JPL
0	2003 TG65	MBA-M	18.37	1.2 km	multiple	2003–2021	26 Oct 2021	53	Disc.: Spacewatch; Added on 17 January 2021	MPC · JPL
2	2003 TH65	MBA-M	18.3	920 m	multiple	2003–2020	16 Oct 2020	47	Disc.: Spacewatch; Added on 17 January 2021	MPC · JPL
1	2003 TK65	MBA-M	18.7	760 m	multiple	2003–2020	20 Oct 2020	27	Disc.: Spacewatch; Added on 17 January 2021	MPC · JPL
0	2003 TN65	MBA-M	17.6	1.3 km	multiple	2003–2021	15 Jan 2021	50	Disc.: Spacewatch; Added on 17 January 2021	MPC · JPL
0	2003 TO65	MBA-M	18.3	650 m	multiple	2003–2020	14 Dec 2020	30	Disc.: LPL/Spacewatch II; Added on 11 May 2021	MPC · JPL
0	2003 TQ65	MBA-I	19.90	310 m	multiple	2003–2021	08 Sep 2021	27	Disc.: Spacewatch; Added on 30 September 2021	MPC · JPL
2	2003 TS65	MBA-M	18.5	1.1 km	multiple	2003–2021	08 Sep 2021	37	Disc.: Spacewatch; Added on 30 September 2021	MPC · JPL
1	2003 TT65	MBA-I	18.50	590 m	multiple	2003–2021	10 Nov 2021	65	Disc.: Spacewatch; Added on 30 September 2021	MPC · JPL
1	2003 TV65	MBA-M	19.1	640 m	multiple	2003–2020	11 Nov 2020	16	Disc.: Spacewatch; Added on 5 November 2021	MPC · JPL
1	2003 TX65	MBA-M	19.3	410 m	multiple	2003–2019	03 Oct 2019	25	Disc.: Spacewatch; Added on 5 November 2021	MPC · JPL
1	2003 TY65	MBA-I	19.6	360 m	multiple	2003–2020	06 Sep 2020	31	Disc.: Spacewatch; Added on 5 November 2021	MPC · JPL

back to top
