= List of unnumbered minor planets: 2003 S (270–389) =

This is a partial list of unnumbered minor planets for principal provisional designations assigned during 16–30 September 2003. Since this period yielded a high number of provisional discoveries, it is further split into several standalone pages. As of November 2025, a total of 194 bodies remain unnumbered for this period. Objects for this year are listed on the following pages: A–E · F–G · H–L · M–R · S_{i} · S_{ii} · S_{iii} · S_{iv} · T · U_{i} · U_{ii} · U_{iii} · U_{iv} · V · W_{i} · W_{ii} and X–Y. Also see previous and next year.

Near-Earth obj.	MBA (inner)	MBA (outer)	Centaur
Mars-crosser	MBA (middle)	Jupiter trojan	Trans-Neptunian obj.
Unclassified

== S ==
U	Designation	Class	Physical		Observations				Description and notes	Ref
U	Designation	Class	H	D	Opp.	Arc	Last	Used	Description and notes	Ref
1	2003 SZ274	MBA-M	18.9	920 m	multiple	2003–2017	08 Dec 2017	23	Disc.: Spacewatch	MPC · JPL
1	2003 SC276	MBA-I	18.8	520 m	multiple	2003–2017	21 Nov 2017	33	Disc.: Spacewatch; Alt.: 2010 VJ42	MPC · JPL
2	2003 SN276	MBA-M	18.0	1.4 km	multiple	2003–2021	06 Oct 2021	48	Disc.: Spacewatch	MPC · JPL
1	2003 SE279	MBA-M	18.22	1.3 km	multiple	2003–2021	08 Sep 2021	28	Disc.: LPL/Spacewatch II; Added on 19 October 2020	MPC · JPL
0	2003 SG287	MBA-M	19.1	840 m	multiple	2003–2017	08 Dec 2017	20	Disc.: Spacewatch	MPC · JPL
3	2003 SP287	MBA-O	18.2	1.3 km	multiple	2003–2019	23 Oct 2019	22	Disc.: LPL/Spacewatch II; Added on 17 January 2021	MPC · JPL
0	2003 SQ287	MBA-I	19.29	410 m	multiple	2003–2020	14 Dec 2020	48	Disc.: LPL/Spacewatch II; Added on 17 January 2021; Alt.: 2013 PJ52	MPC · JPL
0	2003 SD288	MBA-M	19.1	640 m	multiple	2003–2020	17 Nov 2020	30	Disc.: Spacewatch	MPC · JPL
1	2003 ST289	MBA-I	18.9	490 m	multiple	2003–2020	11 Dec 2020	90	Disc.: LONEOS	MPC · JPL
0	2003 SF302	MBA-M	17.8	820 m	multiple	2003–2012	23 Dec 2012	22	Disc.: NEAT; Alt.: 2011 OR54	MPC · JPL
1	2003 SV310	MBA-M	18.4	880 m	multiple	2003–2020	16 Nov 2020	99	Disc.: LINEAR; Alt.: 2016 TH130	MPC · JPL
0	2003 SY314	MBA-O	17.39	2.0 km	multiple	2003-2024	30 Sep 2024	126	Disc.: LINEAR	MPC · JPL
0	2003 SO316	MBA-O	17.1	2.1 km	multiple	2003–2020	13 Sep 2020	29	Disc.: LPL/Spacewatch II; Added on 17 January 2021	MPC · JPL
0	2003 SK317	MBA-O	17.9	1.5 km	multiple	2000–2019	23 Oct 2019	40	Disc.: Spacewatch	MPC · JPL
4	2003 SO317	TNO	8.12	112 km	multiple	2001–2021	05 Nov 2021	39	Disc.: Mauna Kea Obs. LoUTNOs, plutino	MPC · JPL
1	2003 SG323	MBA-I	19.35	400 m	multiple	2003–2019	24 Dec 2019	28	Disc.: Spacewatch	MPC · JPL
1	2003 SW323	MBA-M	18.72	610 m	multiple	2003-2021	25 Nov 2021	30	Disc.: Spacewatch	MPC · JPL
0	2003 SH325	MBA-I	19.28	370 m	multiple	2003-2022	20 Dec 2022	69	Disc.: Spacewatch	MPC · JPL
0	2003 SQ325	MBA-M	18.2	680 m	multiple	2003–2021	10 Jan 2021	40	Disc.: NEAT	MPC · JPL
0	2003 SU326	HIL	16.6	2.7 km	multiple	2003–2020	24 Dec 2020	47	Disc.: Spacewatch	MPC · JPL
0	2003 SA327	MBA-M	18.92	920 m	multiple	2003–2021	24 Oct 2021	67	Disc.: Spacewatch	MPC · JPL
1	2003 SH327	MBA-M	18.12	570 m	multiple	2003-2024	03 Dec 2024	33	Disc.: Spacewatch	MPC · JPL
0	2003 SN328	MBA-I	18.28	650 m	multiple	2003-3033	27 Dec 2022	108	Disc.: LONEOS	MPC · JPL
0	2003 SF329	MBA-I	18.4	620 m	multiple	2003–2018	12 Jul 2018	40	Disc.: LONEOS	MPC · JPL
0	2003 SQ329	MBA-M	18.56	1.1 km	multiple	2003–2021	27 Oct 2021	96	Disc.: LPL/Spacewatch II	MPC · JPL
0	2003 SQ330	MBA-I	19.2	430 m	multiple	2003–2016	27 Dec 2016	27	Disc.: SDSS	MPC · JPL
1	2003 SR330	MBA-M	18.3	650 m	multiple	2003–2019	28 Aug 2019	38	Disc.: SDSS	MPC · JPL
0	2003 SV330	MBA-M	18.7	760 m	multiple	2003–2020	14 Oct 2020	58	Disc.: SDSS	MPC · JPL
0	2003 SY330	MBA-I	18.8	520 m	multiple	2003–2017	17 Nov 2017	102	Disc.: SDSS; Alt.: 2010 MK24	MPC · JPL
1	2003 SA331	MBA-O	17.9	1.5 km	multiple	2003–2020	23 Dec 2020	38	Disc.: SDSS; Alt.: 2014 XD20	MPC · JPL
0	2003 SY331	MBA-I	19.01	470 m	multiple	2003–2021	02 Oct 2021	37	Disc.: SDSS; Alt.: 2014 WJ87	MPC · JPL
0	2003 SQ332	MBA-M	17.17	2.0 km	multiple	2003–2021	06 Dec 2021	231	Disc.: SDSS; Alt.: 2012 QF15	MPC · JPL
0	2003 SU332	MBA-I	18.6	820 m	multiple	2003-3030	17 Jul 2020	36	Disc.: Spacewatch	MPC · JPL
0	2003 SV332	HIL	16.6	2.7 km	multiple	1995–2019	08 Nov 2019	66	Disc.: Spacewatch; Alt.: 2011 UL222	MPC · JPL
0	2003 SQ333	MBA-I	19.31	410 m	multiple	2003–2021	09 Dec 2021	60	Disc.: SDSS	MPC · JPL
0	2003 SV333	MCA	18.80	520 m	multiple	2003–2019	24 Jul 2019	91	Disc.: SDSS	MPC · JPL
2	2003 SR335	MBA-I	19.3	430 m	multiple	2003-2022	19 Oct 2022	39	Disc.: SDSS	MPC · JPL
0	2003 SW335	MCA	20.0	300 m	multiple	2003–2020	10 Dec 2020	53	Disc.: SDSS; Alt.: 2010 XE87	MPC · JPL
0	2003 SB336	MBA-M	19.0	670 m	multiple	2003–2021	03 Jan 2021	86	Disc.: SDSS	MPC · JPL
2	2003 SV336	MBA-I	19.16	330 m	multiple	2003-2023	16 Nov 2023	48	Disc.: SDSS	MPC · JPL
0	2003 SX336	HIL	16.1	3.4 km	multiple	2003–2019	24 Dec 2019	45	Disc.: SDSS	MPC · JPL
0	2003 SE337	MBA-O	18.1	1.3 km	multiple	2003–2020	09 Dec 2020	31	Disc.: SDSS	MPC · JPL
0	2003 SW338	MBA-I	19.06	460 m	multiple	2002–2021	27 Nov 2021	58	Disc.: SDSS; Alt.: 2014 VM21	MPC · JPL
0	2003 SA340	MBA-M	17.9	780 m	multiple	2003–2020	16 Dec 2020	49	Disc.: SDSS	MPC · JPL
0	2003 SE340	MBA-O	17.5	1.8 km	multiple	2003–2020	20 Oct 2020	65	Disc.: SDSS	MPC · JPL
0	2003 SW340	MBA-I	19.23	420 m	multiple	2003–2021	26 Oct 2021	58	Disc.: Spacewatch; Added on 21 August 2021	MPC · JPL
2	2003 SA341	MBA-O	17.9	1.5 km	multiple	2003–2019	25 Sep 2019	27	Disc.: Spacewatch; Alt.: 2019 PM30	MPC · JPL
0	2003 SV341 = (887227)	MBA-M	17.8	820 m	multiple	2003–2021	07 Jan 2021	21	Disc.: Spacewatch	MPC · JPL
1	2003 SW341	MBA-O	17.1	2.1 km	multiple	2003–2019	22 Oct 2019	45	Disc.: Spacewatch	MPC · JPL
2	2003 SX341	MBA-I	19.1	450 m	multiple	2003–2016	06 Oct 2016	27	Disc.: Spacewatch	MPC · JPL
1	2003 SY343	MCA	19.9	310 m	multiple	2003–2017	22 Oct 2017	27	Disc.: Spacewatch	MPC · JPL
0	2003 SO344	MBA-I	18.5	590 m	multiple	2003–2020	20 Jul 2020	52	Disc.: Spacewatch	MPC · JPL
–	2003 SJ345	MBA-M	19.1	450 m	single	11 days	29 Sep 2003	9	Disc.: Spacewatch	MPC · JPL
1	2003 SW345	MBA-M	17.8	1.5 km	multiple	2003–2017	13 Nov 2017	32	Disc.: Spacewatch	MPC · JPL
2	2003 SB346	MBA-O	18.09	1.2 km	multiple	2003-2023	12 Oct 2023	37	Disc.: Spacewatch	MPC · JPL
1	2003 SD346	MBA-M	18.73	1.0 km	multiple	2003–2021	06 Oct 2021	41	Disc.: Spacewatch	MPC · JPL
1	2003 SU346	MBA-M	19.0	670 m	multiple	2003–2020	10 Aug 2020	51	Disc.: Spacewatch	MPC · JPL
0	2003 SY346	MBA-I	18.8	520 m	multiple	2003–2018	10 Nov 2018	56	Disc.: Spacewatch; Alt.: 2007 VA164	MPC · JPL
3	2003 SZ346	MBA-O	18.97	920 m	multiple	2003-2024	24 Oct 2024	26	Disc.: Spacewatch	MPC · JPL
1	2003 SA347	MBA-O	17.4	1.8 km	multiple	2003–2021	16 Jan 2021	25	Disc.: Spacewatch	MPC · JPL
1	2003 SG347	MBA-I	18.85	520 m	multiple	2003-2022	26 Nov 2022	24	Disc.: Spacewatch	MPC · JPL
0	2003 SK347	MBA-M	19.0	670 m	multiple	2003–2020	16 Sep 2020	76	Disc.: Spacewatch; Alt.: 2016 WE50	MPC · JPL
2	2003 SO347	MBA-M	19.6	510 m	multiple	2003–2020	17 Oct 2020	34	Disc.: Spacewatch; Alt.: 2020 PV36	MPC · JPL
0	2003 SE348	MBA-M	18.6	800 m	multiple	2003–2021	05 Jan 2021	48	Disc.: Spacewatch; Added on 11 May 2021; Alt.: 2020 QG44	MPC · JPL
–	2003 SG348	MBA-I	20.0	300 m	single	11 days	29 Sep 2003	12	Disc.: Spacewatch	MPC · JPL
0	2003 SH348	MBA-O	17.2	2.0 km	multiple	2003–2021	22 Jan 2021	30	Disc.: Spacewatch; Alt.: 2016 CZ115	MPC · JPL
2	2003 SN348	MBA-I	20.08	220 m	multiple	2003-2024	05 Dec 2024	28	Disc.: Spacewatch	MPC · JPL
0	2003 SS348 = (887228)	MBA-I	19.5	370 m	multiple	2003–2019	26 Sep 2019	63	Disc.: Spacewatch; Alt.: 2016 WW15	MPC · JPL
1	2003 SW348 = (887229)	MBA-M	18.0	1.1 km	multiple	2003–2020	11 Oct 2020	57	Disc.: Spacewatch; Alt.: 2016 TV79	MPC · JPL
0	2003 SL349	MBA-O	18.1	1.3 km	multiple	2003–2019	22 Sep 2019	29	Disc.: Spacewatch	MPC · JPL
1	2003 SQ349	MBA-I	19.3	410 m	multiple	2003–2017	26 Nov 2017	30	Disc.: Spacewatch	MPC · JPL
4	2003 SZ349	MBA-O	18.0	1.4 km	multiple	2003–2014	30 Aug 2014	19	Disc.: Spacewatch; Added on 21 August 2021	MPC · JPL
0	2003 SP350	MBA-M	19.40	550 m	multiple	2003–2021	05 Jan 2021	51	Disc.: Spacewatch; Added on 21 August 2021; Alt.: 2020 SY80	MPC · JPL
0	2003 SW350	MBA-I	18.63	560 m	multiple	2003–2021	09 Nov 2021	50	Disc.: Spacewatch	MPC · JPL
0	2003 SZ350	MBA-O	17.5	1.8 km	multiple	2003–2018	08 Aug 2018	29	Disc.: NEAT	MPC · JPL
0	2003 SL352	MBA-M	18.7	760 m	multiple	2003–2020	14 Nov 2020	55	Disc.: Spacewatch; Added on 17 January 2021	MPC · JPL
1	2003 SS354	MBA-I	19.1	450 m	multiple	2003–2020	21 Sep 2020	25	Disc.: LONEOS; Alt.: 2010 WP33	MPC · JPL
0	2003 SR356	MBA-I	19.0	470 m	multiple	2003–2020	05 Nov 2020	27	Disc.: LPL/Spacewatch II	MPC · JPL
1	2003 SD357	MBA-I	19.6	360 m	multiple	2003–2019	25 Sep 2019	19	Disc.: LPL/Spacewatch II; Added on 21 August 2021	MPC · JPL
0	2003 SS357	MBA-M	18.0	1.4 km	multiple	2003–2021	10 Sep 2021	34	Disc.: LPL/Spacewatch II; Added on 29 January 2022	MPC · JPL
0	2003 SU357	MBA-I	18.8	520 m	multiple	2003–2020	15 Oct 2020	50	Disc.: LPL/Spacewatch II; Added on 17 January 2021	MPC · JPL
0	2003 SP358	MCA	17.9	780 m	multiple	2003–2019	04 Apr 2019	35	Disc.: Spacewatch	MPC · JPL
1	2003 SQ358	MBA-M	17.9	780 m	multiple	2003–2020	23 Oct 2020	20	Disc.: Spacewatch; Added on 30 September 2021	MPC · JPL
1	2003 SF360	MBA-M	18.6	800 m	multiple	2003–2020	08 Dec 2020	26	Disc.: Spacewatch	MPC · JPL
0	2003 SM360	MBA-I	19.36	400 m	multiple	2003–2021	02 Dec 2021	29	Disc.: Spacewatch; Alt.: 2017 PC36	MPC · JPL
0	2003 SD361 = (887230)	MBA-O	17.4	1.8 km	multiple	2003–2020	10 Dec 2020	37	Disc.: Spacewatch	MPC · JPL
1	2003 SR361	MCA	19.0	470 m	multiple	2003–2016	25 Oct 2016	43	Disc.: Spacewatch; Alt.: 2016 PR69	MPC · JPL
0	2003 SK362	MBA-I	19.09	450 m	multiple	2003–2021	07 Oct 2021	63	Disc.: LPL/Spacewatch II; Alt.: 2014 WH21	MPC · JPL
0	2003 ST362	MBA-I	18.94	480 m	multiple	2003–2021	30 Nov 2021	55	Disc.: Spacewatch	MPC · JPL
1	2003 SC363	MBA-M	17.9	1.1 km	multiple	2003–2020	21 Jul 2020	43	Disc.: Spacewatch	MPC · JPL
1	2003 SZ363	MBA-I	19.3	410 m	multiple	2003–2021	29 Nov 2021	19	Disc.: SDSS; Added on 29 January 2022	MPC · JPL
0	2003 SL365	MBA-I	18.75	530 m	multiple	2003–2021	13 Sep 2021	39	Disc.: SDSS	MPC · JPL
1	2003 SC366	MBA-M	18.20	1.3 km	multiple	2003–2021	08 Sep 2021	25	Disc.: SDSS	MPC · JPL
0	2003 SN366	MBA-I	19.4	390 m	multiple	2003–2020	11 Oct 2020	33	Disc.: SDSS; Added on 17 January 2021; Alt.: 2010 VS76	MPC · JPL
0	2003 SO366	MBA-I	18.6	570 m	multiple	2003–2021	11 May 2021	38	Disc.: SDSS; Alt.: 2014 QE270	MPC · JPL
3	2003 SH367	MBA-I	19.9	310 m	multiple	2003–2015	11 Jun 2015	14	Disc.: SDSS	MPC · JPL
0	2003 SJ367	MBA-M	18.53	580 m	multiple	2003–2020	20 Oct 2020	34	Disc.: SDSS; Alt.: 2015 HP165	MPC · JPL
0	2003 SR367	MBA-M	18.1	710 m	multiple	2003–2019	03 Jul 2019	49	Disc.: SDSS; Alt.: 2015 PP236	MPC · JPL
1	2003 SV367	MBA-M	18.49	840 m	multiple	2003–2021	07 Nov 2021	29	Disc.: SDSS; Added on 21 August 2021; Alt.: 2012 TD279	MPC · JPL
2	2003 SC368	MBA-I	19.3	410 m	multiple	2003–2019	25 Sep 2019	29	Disc.: SDSS	MPC · JPL
0	2003 SK368	MBA-O	17.2	2.0 km	multiple	2003–2020	08 Dec 2020	38	Disc.: SDSS	MPC · JPL
2	2003 SL368	MBA-M	18.73	750 m	multiple	2003–2021	11 Nov 2021	24	Disc.: SDSS	MPC · JPL
0	2003 SO369	MBA-O	17.8	1.5 km	multiple	2003–2019	19 Nov 2019	35	Disc.: SDSS; Alt.: 2013 NW9	MPC · JPL
0	2003 SP369	MBA-M	17.98	1.4 km	multiple	2003–2021	04 Oct 2021	45	Disc.: SDSS	MPC · JPL
0	2003 SA370	MBA-M	18.03	1.4 km	multiple	2003–2021	04 Oct 2021	47	Disc.: SDSS; Added on 22 July 2020	MPC · JPL
0	2003 SB370 = (887231)	MBA-O	17.6	1.7 km	multiple	2003–2021	17 Jan 2021	41	Disc.: SDSS; Alt.: 2014 SL330	MPC · JPL
0	2003 SG370	MBA-I	19.0	470 m	multiple	2003–2018	13 Aug 2018	39	Disc.: SDSS; Alt.: 2007 VU91	MPC · JPL
3	2003 SL370	MBA-I	19.91	300 m	multiple	2003-2023	16 Nov 2023	20	Disc.: SDSS; Alt.: 2023 UR28	MPC · JPL
0	2003 SN370	MBA-O	17.39	1.3 km	multiple	2003-2024	11 Aug 2024	40	Disc.: SDSS	MPC · JPL
2	2003 ST370	MBA-M	18.58	1.1 km	multiple	2003–2021	13 Sep 2021	30	Disc.: SDSS; Added on 30 September 2021	MPC · JPL
0	2003 SU370	MBA-I	19.6	360 m	multiple	2003–2020	14 Oct 2020	26	Disc.: SDSS; Added on 17 June 2021; Alt.: 2020 RP21	MPC · JPL
0	2003 SY370	MBA-O	17.88	1.2 km	multiple	2003-2024	22 Oct 2024	45	Disc.: SDSS	MPC · JPL
0	2003 SH371	MBA-I	18.89	500 m	multiple	2003–2021	30 Jun 2021	49	Disc.: SDSS	MPC · JPL
2	2003 SM371	MBA-M	19.24	600 m	multiple	2003	05 Sep 2024	30	Disc.: SDSS; Alt.: 2024 QV3	MPC · JPL
0	2003 ST371	MBA-M	18.7	760 m	multiple	2003–2020	15 Oct 2020	86	Disc.: SDSS	MPC · JPL
2	2003 SV371	MBA-I	19.2	430 m	multiple	2003–2014	25 Oct 2014	27	Disc.: SDSS; Alt.: 2014 SB402	MPC · JPL
0	2003 SZ371	MBA-I	19.25	420 m	multiple	2003–2021	26 Oct 2021	46	Disc.: SDSS	MPC · JPL
E	2003 SF372	MBA-M	18.4	1.2 km	single	2 days	28 Sep 2003	7	Disc.: SDSS	MPC · JPL
2	2003 SO372	MBA-M	18.20	960 m	multiple	2003–2021	09 Nov 2021	30	Disc.: SDSS	MPC · JPL
3	2003 SQ372	MBA-O	17.8	1.5 km	multiple	2003–2019	26 Sep 2019	16	Disc.: SDSS	MPC · JPL
5	2003 SX372	MBA-M	19.82	420 m	multiple	2003-2015	25 May 2015	15	Disc.: SDSS	MPC · JPL
1	2003 SE373	MBA-I	19.11	450 m	multiple	2003–2021	11 Jun 2021	50	Disc.: SDSS; Alt.: 2014 QY339	MPC · JPL
0	2003 SJ373	MCA	19.4	390 m	multiple	2003–2020	15 Oct 2020	64	Disc.: SDSS; Added on 19 October 2020	MPC · JPL
1	2003 SM373	MBA-M	18.7	760 m	multiple	2003–2020	12 Sep 2020	25	Disc.: SDSS; Added on 17 January 2021	MPC · JPL
0	2003 SV373	MBA-O	17.69	1.1 km	multiple	2003-2024	31 Jul 2024	42	Disc.: SDSS	MPC · JPL
0	2003 SX373	MBA-I	19.5	370 m	multiple	2003–2020	16 Nov 2020	40	Disc.: SDSS; Added on 30 September 2021; Alt.: 2013 PU111	MPC · JPL
1	2003 SY373	MBA-O	17.5	1.8 km	multiple	2003–2020	09 Dec 2020	55	Disc.: SDSS; Alt.: 2010 CR212	MPC · JPL
0	2003 SZ373	MBA-O	17.3	1.9 km	multiple	2003–2019	29 Oct 2019	39	Disc.: SDSS	MPC · JPL
1	2003 SC374	MBA-O	18.0	1.4 km	multiple	2003–2019	01 Oct 2019	33	Disc.: SDSS	MPC · JPL
0	2003 SE374	MBA-M	18.3	1.2 km	multiple	2003–2021	06 Nov 2021	35	Disc.: SDSS	MPC · JPL
2	2003 SG374	MBA-I	20.1	280 m	multiple	2003–2021	11 Nov 2021	41	Disc.: SDSS	MPC · JPL
–	2003 SP374	MBA-O	17.2	2.0 km	single	3 days	29 Sep 2003	7	Disc.: SDSS	MPC · JPL
–	2003 SW374	MBA-I	19.2	430 m	single	28 days	24 Oct 2003	8	Disc.: SDSS	MPC · JPL
2	2003 SC375	MBA-I	20.0	300 m	multiple	2003–2020	17 Nov 2020	23	Disc.: SDSS; Added on 11 May 2021; Alt.: 2020 TP33	MPC · JPL
0	2003 SJ375	MBA-I	19.70	340 m	multiple	2003–2021	17 May 2021	25	Disc.: SDSS	MPC · JPL
4	2003 SP375	MBA-O	18.48	1.2 km	multiple	2003-2022	17 Nov 2022	22	Disc.: SDSS	MPC · JPL
0	2003 SZ375	MBA-M	18.27	930 m	multiple	2003–2022	04 Jan 2022	46	Disc.: SDSS	MPC · JPL
–	2003 SD376	MBA-M	20.1	400 m	single	3 days	29 Sep 2003	6	Disc.: SDSS	MPC · JPL
2	2003 SN376	MBA-O	17.7	1.6 km	multiple	2003–2021	15 Apr 2021	25	Disc.: SDSS; Added on 21 August 2021	MPC · JPL
0	2003 SQ376	MBA-O	17.5	1.8 km	multiple	2003–2019	26 Sep 2019	39	Disc.: SDSS; Alt.: 2018 LQ8	MPC · JPL
0	2003 SS376	MBA-M	18.1	1.0 km	multiple	2003–2018	07 Mar 2018	23	Disc.: SDSS	MPC · JPL
1	2003 SY376	MBA-O	18.1	1.1 km	multiple	2003-2020	11 Oct 2020	26	Disc.: SDSS	MPC · JPL
0	2003 SJ377	MBA-I	18.9	490 m	multiple	1996–2020	15 Aug 2020	35	Disc.: SDSS; Added on 19 October 2020; Alt.: 2010 TC108	MPC · JPL
0	2003 SO377	MBA-I	19.3	410 m	multiple	2003–2021	14 Apr 2021	25	Disc.: SDSS; Alt.: 2014 NW7	MPC · JPL
5	2003 SP377	MBA-I	19.6	360 m	multiple	2003–2014	24 Apr 2014	11	Disc.: SDSS	MPC · JPL
1	2003 SL378	MBA-M	18.8	520 m	multiple	2003–2019	03 Oct 2019	43	Disc.: SDSS	MPC · JPL
2	2003 SP378	MBA-O	18.1	1.3 km	multiple	2003–2020	23 Oct 2020	16	Disc.: SDSS; Added on 17 January 2021	MPC · JPL
0	2003 SQ378	MBA-M	17.9	1.5 km	multiple	2003–2021	04 Oct 2021	102	Disc.: SDSS	MPC · JPL
–	2003 SU378	MBA-I	20.1	280 m	single	3 days	29 Sep 2003	6	Disc.: SDSS	MPC · JPL
0	2003 SZ378	MBA-O	17.86	1.5 km	multiple	2003–2022	25 Jan 2022	35	Disc.: SDSS; Added on 17 January 2021	MPC · JPL
0	2003 SD379	MBA-O	17.16	2.1 km	multiple	2003–2022	26 Jan 2022	60	Disc.: SDSS	MPC · JPL
0	2003 SF379	MBA-O	16.9	2.3 km	multiple	2003–2019	30 Jun 2019	35	Disc.: SDSS; Alt.: 2014 SP146	MPC · JPL
4	2003 SO379	MBA-O	19.5	1.1 km	multiple	2003-2021	08 Dec 2021	16	Disc.: SDSS	MPC · JPL
0	2003 SP379	MBA-I	19.00	470 m	multiple	2003–2021	11 Sep 2021	49	Disc.: SDSS; Added on 21 August 2021	MPC · JPL
0	2003 SV379	MBA-I	19.1	450 m	multiple	2003–2020	22 Apr 2020	36	Disc.: SDSS; Added on 22 July 2020	MPC · JPL
0	2003 SZ379	MBA-I	18.8	520 m	multiple	2003–2019	22 Aug 2019	27	Disc.: SDSS; Added on 22 July 2020	MPC · JPL
0	2003 ST380	MBA-M	17.95	1.4 km	multiple	2003–2021	08 Sep 2021	52	Disc.: SDSS	MPC · JPL
–	2003 SV380	MBA-I	20.1	280 m	single	3 days	29 Sep 2003	6	Disc.: SDSS	MPC · JPL
0	2003 SZ380	MBA-M	17.9	1.5 km	multiple	2003–2021	03 Oct 2021	52	Disc.: SDSS; Added on 30 September 2021; Alt.: 2013 YF132	MPC · JPL
0	2003 SC381	MBA-M	18.1	1.3 km	multiple	2003–2021	10 Aug 2021	21	Disc.: SDSS; Added on 21 August 2021	MPC · JPL
1	2003 SD381	MBA-O	17.6	1.7 km	multiple	2003–2016	03 Apr 2016	34	Disc.: SDSS	MPC · JPL
1	2003 SO381	MBA-O	17.5	1.8 km	multiple	2003–2019	24 Nov 2019	39	Disc.: SDSS; Alt.: 2014 XR23	MPC · JPL
0	2003 SF382	MBA-M	18.18	1.3 km	multiple	2003–2021	29 Oct 2021	44	Disc.: SDSS; Added on 30 September 2021; Alt.: 2003 SB415	MPC · JPL
2	2003 SG382	MBA-M	19.4	550 m	multiple	2003–2020	19 Nov 2020	22	Disc.: SDSS	MPC · JPL
2	2003 SR382	HIL	16.6	2.7 km	multiple	2003–2019	29 Oct 2019	45	Disc.: SDSS	MPC · JPL
2	2003 SJ383	MBA-I	19.4	390 m	multiple	2003–2021	30 Nov 2021	29	Disc.: SDSS	MPC · JPL
0	2003 SK383	MBA-O	18.0	1.4 km	multiple	2003–2016	03 Apr 2016	33	Disc.: SDSS; Alt.: 2005 BP30	MPC · JPL
0	2003 SN383	HIL	16.8	2.4 km	multiple	2003–2019	02 Nov 2019	52	Disc.: SDSS; Alt.: 2011 UU229	MPC · JPL
0	2003 SO383	MBA-M	18.1	1.0 km	multiple	2003–2020	14 Sep 2020	26	Disc.: SDSS; Added on 9 March 2021	MPC · JPL
0	2003 SV383	MBA-M	18.1	1.0 km	multiple	2003–2020	15 Oct 2020	43	Disc.: SDSS; Added on 17 January 2021	MPC · JPL
0	2003 SX383	MBA-M	17.92	780 m	multiple	2003-2025	19 Jan 2025	96	Disc.: SDSS	MPC · JPL
0	2003 SB384	HIL	16.79	2.4 km	multiple	2003–2021	18 Jan 2021	45	Disc.: SDSS; Added on 11 May 2021; Alt.: 2011 UG16	MPC · JPL
0	2003 SR384	MBA-M	18.4	880 m	multiple	2003–2020	14 Nov 2020	30	Disc.: SDSS	MPC · JPL
0	2003 SK385	MBA-O	17.5	1.8 km	multiple	2003–2020	23 Sep 2020	30	Disc.: SDSS; Added on 17 January 2021; Alt.: 2015 XO183	MPC · JPL
0	2003 SP385	MBA-M	18.56	820 m	multiple	2003–2020	29 Jun 2020	26	Disc.: SDSS	MPC · JPL
0	2003 ST385	MBA-I	19.6	360 m	multiple	2003–2021	12 Nov 2021	28	Disc.: SDSS	MPC · JPL
0	2003 SW385	MBA-M	18.9	700 m	multiple	2003–2020	15 Oct 2020	71	Disc.: SDSS	MPC · JPL
0	2003 SY385	MBA-I	18.76	530 m	multiple	2003–2021	03 Oct 2021	50	Disc.: SDSS; Alt.: 2013 JQ16	MPC · JPL
1	2003 SZ385	MBA-M	18.83	700 m	multiple	2003-2025	27 Nov 2025	110	Disc.: SDSS	MPC · JPL
0	2003 SF386 = (887233)	MBA-I	19.06	460 m	multiple	2003–2021	02 Dec 2021	76	Disc.: SDSS	MPC · JPL
0	2003 SG386	MBA-M	18.6	800 m	multiple	2003–2020	15 Sep 2020	17	Disc.: SDSS; Added on 17 January 2021	MPC · JPL
2	2003 SN386	MBA-I	19.4	390 m	multiple	2003–2018	10 Oct 2018	20	Disc.: SDSS	MPC · JPL
0	2003 SR386	MBA-O	17.0	2.2 km	multiple	2003–2020	05 Nov 2020	41	Disc.: SDSS; Alt.: 2010 BP146	MPC · JPL
0	2003 SR387	MBA-O	17.7	1.6 km	multiple	2003–2019	25 Oct 2019	20	Disc.: SDSS	MPC · JPL
0	2003 SS387	MBA-M	18.49	840 m	multiple	2003–2021	30 Nov 2021	26	Disc.: SDSS; Added on 19 October 2020	MPC · JPL
0	2003 SZ387	MBA-I	18.36	630 m	multiple	2003–2021	06 Nov 2021	72	Disc.: SDSS	MPC · JPL
0	2003 SB388	MBA-I	19.04	460 m	multiple	2003–2021	25 Nov 2021	47	Disc.: SDSS; Added on 21 August 2021	MPC · JPL
1	2003 SD388	MBA-I	19.7	340 m	multiple	2003–2013	24 Nov 2013	21	Disc.: SDSS; Added on 21 August 2021	MPC · JPL
1	2003 SE388	MBA-I	19.1	450 m	multiple	2003–2018	07 Aug 2018	15	Disc.: SDSS; Added on 21 August 2021	MPC · JPL

back to top
