= List of unnumbered minor planets: 2002 L–O =

This is a partial list of unnumbered minor planets for principal provisional designations assigned between 1 June and 31 July 2002. As of March 2026, a total of 100 bodies remain unnumbered for this period. Objects for this year are listed on the following pages: A–B · C · D–F · G–K · L–O · P · Q_{i} · Q_{ii} · R_{i} · R_{ii} · S · T_{i} · T_{ii} · U–V and W–Y. Also see previous and next year.

Near-Earth obj.	MBA (inner)	MBA (outer)	Centaur
Mars-crosser	MBA (middle)	Jupiter trojan	Trans-Neptunian obj.
Unclassified

== L ==
U	Designation	Class	Physical		Observations				Description and notes	Ref
U	Designation	Class	H	D	Opp.	Arc	Last	Used	Description and notes	Ref
9	2002 LK	APO	24.2	51 m	single	6 days	08 Jun 2002	66	Disc.: KLENOT	MPC · JPL
2	2002 LN	MCA	18.5	1.1 km	multiple	2002–2018	08 Sep 2018	22	Disc.: NEAT; Added on 9 March 2021; Alt.: 2018 LQ	MPC · JPL
3	2002 LW	APO	22.4	120 m	multiple	2002–2005	25 Dec 2005	64	Disc.: NEAT	MPC · JPL
1	2002 LY1	ATE	22.3	120 m	multiple	2002–2016	12 Jun 2016	171	Disc.: NEAT	MPC · JPL
2	2002 LH2	MBA-M	18.4	620 m	multiple	2002–2018	10 Jul 2018	51	Disc.: LPL/Spacewatch II; Alt.: 2018 LS10	MPC · JPL
0	2002 LU2	MBA-M	17.2	1.5 km	multiple	2002–2019	04 Jul 2019	51	Disc.: LPL/Spacewatch II	MPC · JPL
0	2002 LG3	APO	19.9	370 m	multiple	2002–2021	11 Jan 2021	131	Disc.: LONEOS	MPC · JPL
1	2002 LH3	AMO	20.3	310 m	multiple	2002–2005	11 Jul 2005	77	Disc.: LINEAR	MPC · JPL
7	2002 LR24	APO	24.3	49 m	single	7 days	15 Jun 2002	41	Disc.: LINEAR	MPC · JPL
5	2002 LS24	APO	22.1	140 m	single	114 days	30 Sep 2002	34	Disc.: AMOS; AMO at MPC	MPC · JPL
6	2002 LJ27	Asteroid	18.1	1.3 km	single	25 days	03 Jul 2002	35	Disc.: LINEAR; MCA at MPC	MPC · JPL
1	2002 LD31	AMO	21.37	200 m	multiple	2002-2025	29 Apr 2025	37	Disc.: LINEAR	MPC · JPL
0	2002 LY33	MBA-I	18.0	750 m	multiple	2002-2022	25 Mar 2022	42	Disc.: NEAT	MPC · JPL
7	2002 LZ45	APO	23.0	89 m	single	10 days	24 Jun 2002	125	Disc.: LINEAR	MPC · JPL
0	2002 LF48	MBA-O	16.9	2.3 km	multiple	2002–2018	11 Jun 2018	37	Disc.: LPL/Spacewatch II	MPC · JPL
0	2002 LF55	MBA-M	18.2	960 m	multiple	2002–2019	07 Apr 2019	21	Disc.: LPL/Spacewatch II	MPC · JPL
0	2002 LH63	MBA-M	18.0	750 m	multiple	2002–2019	27 Oct 2019	59	Disc.: NEAT	MPC · JPL
1	2002 LX64	APO	21.2	200 m	multiple	2002–2021	14 Jun 2021	107	Disc.: NEAT; Potentially hazardous object Alt.: 2017 UY42	MPC · JPL
0	2002 LE66	MBA-M	18.0	750 m	multiple	2002–2019	24 Aug 2019	50	Disc.: LPL/Spacewatch II	MPC · JPL
0	2002 LK66	MBA-I	19.3	410 m	multiple	2002–2019	28 Aug 2019	63	Disc.: La Silla Obs.	MPC · JPL
0	2002 LM66	MBA-M	18.1	710 m	multiple	2002–2019	25 Sep 2019	32	Disc.: LPL/Spacewatch II	MPC · JPL

back to top

== M ==
U	Designation	Class	Physical		Observations				Description and notes	Ref
U	Designation	Class	H	D	Opp.	Arc	Last	Used	Description and notes	Ref
0	2002 MN	APO	23.71	68 m	multiple	2002-2024	02 Jul 2024	93	Disc.: LINEAR	MPC · JPL
1	2002 MU	MBA-O	16.7	2.5 km	multiple	2002–2020	14 Nov 2020	29	Disc.: LPL/Spacewatch II; Added on 9 March 2021	MPC · JPL
0	2002 MV	MBA-O	17.62	1.7 km	multiple	2002–2021	06 Jun 2021	52	Disc.: LPL/Spacewatch II	MPC · JPL
4	2002 MX	APO	21.7	160 m	single	19 days	05 Jul 2002	32	Disc.: LINEAR; Potentially hazardous object	MPC · JPL
1	2002 MY	AMO	22.5	110 m	multiple	2002–2019	14 Jun 2019	84	Disc.: LINEAR	MPC · JPL
0	2002 MP1	MCA	18.99	470 m	multiple	2002–2020	16 Oct 2020	83	Disc.: LINEAR	MPC · JPL
0	2002 MT1	AMO	21.2	200 m	multiple	2002–2013	11 Oct 2013	68	Disc.: NEAT	MPC · JPL
0	2002 MR3	APO	21.96	100 m	multiple	2002-2024	06 Jul 2024	145	Disc.: LINEAR; Potentially hazardous object	MPC · JPL
0	2002 MS3	APO	19.25	500 m	multiple	2002–2013	11 Dec 2013	128	Disc.: NEAT	MPC · JPL
6	2002 MT3	APO	19.9	370 m	single	31 days	31 Jul 2002	66	Disc.: NEAT; Potentially hazardous object	MPC · JPL
2	2002 MH7	MBA-I	19.03	470 m	multiple	2002-2023	09 Jul 2023	29	Disc.: NEAT	MPC · JPL
0	2002 MS7	MBA-M	18.5	840 m	multiple	2002–2015	03 Nov 2015	68	Disc.: NEAT	MPC · JPL

back to top

== N ==
U	Designation	Class	Physical		Observations				Description and notes	Ref
U	Designation	Class	H	D	Opp.	Arc	Last	Used	Description and notes	Ref
2	2002 NK	MCA	17.98	1.1 km	multiple	2002-2024	01 Jan 2024	57	Disc.: NEAT	MPC · JPL
6	2002 NW	APO	24.2	51 m	single	6 days	11 Jul 2002	46	Disc.: NEAT	MPC · JPL
–	2002 NU16	MCA	22.8	82 m	single	1 day	14 Jul 2002	20	Disc.: La Palma Obs.	MPC · JPL
3	2002 NY29	MBA-M	18.7	540 m	multiple	2002–2014	21 May 2014	35	Disc.: LPL/Spacewatch II; Alt.: 2014 JY7	MPC · JPL
0	2002 NY40	APO	19.0	560 m	multiple	2002–2005	15 Jul 2005	2263	Disc.: LINEAR; Potentially hazardous object	MPC · JPL
0	2002 NS57	MBA-M	18.2	680 m	multiple	2002–2019	04 Nov 2019	35	Disc.: NEAT; Added on 17 June 2021; Alt.: 2015 XQ214	MPC · JPL
0	2002 NO62	MBA-I	19.0	470 m	multiple	2002–2019	23 Aug 2019	24	Disc.: NEAT	MPC · JPL
0	2002 NV62	MBA-M	18.0	1.1 km	multiple	2002–2015	03 Oct 2015	79	Disc.: NEAT	MPC · JPL
0	2002 NU64	MBA-I	18.61	560 m	multiple	2002–2021	10 Aug 2021	41	Disc.: NEAT	MPC · JPL
0	2002 NA65	MBA-I	18.36	630 m	multiple	2002–2021	08 Aug 2021	37	Disc.: NEAT	MPC · JPL
2	2002 NR66	MBA-I	19.2	430 m	multiple	2002–2019	29 Sep 2019	23	Disc.: NEAT	MPC · JPL
1	2002 NX66	MCA	19.8	330 m	multiple	2002–2018	11 Jul 2018	30	Disc.: NEAT	MPC · JPL
2	2002 NB68	MBA-I	18.9	490 m	multiple	2002–2020	11 Nov 2020	38	Disc.: NEAT	MPC · JPL
0	2002 NE71	APO	19.2	510 m	multiple	2002–2018	24 Jul 2018	222	Disc.: NEAT	MPC · JPL
0	2002 NX71	MBA-I	18.84	510 m	multiple	2002–2021	13 Oct 2021	55	Disc.: NEAT	MPC · JPL
1	2002 NB72	MBA-I	19.20	430 m	multiple	2002–2021	28 Oct 2021	41	Disc.: NEAT	MPC · JPL
0	2002 ND72	MCA	19.66	360 m	multiple	2002–2025	24 Jun 2025	37	Disc.: NEAT; Added on 21 August 2021	MPC · JPL
1	2002 NM72	MBA-M	17.86	800 m	multiple	2002–2021	14 Apr 2021	44	Disc.: NEAT	MPC · JPL
0	2002 NR72	MBA-M	17.8	1.2 km	multiple	2002–2019	23 Apr 2019	29	Disc.: NEAT	MPC · JPL
1	2002 NL73	MCA	17.8	820 m	multiple	2002–2020	25 Jan 2020	34	Disc.: NEAT	MPC · JPL
1	2002 NG74	MBA-I	19.0	470 m	multiple	2002–2020	09 Dec 2020	30	Disc.: NEAT	MPC · JPL
0	2002 NQ74	MBA-M	17.69	1.6 km	multiple	2002–2021	29 Nov 2021	105	Disc.: NEAT; Alt.: 2016 PV37	MPC · JPL
1	2002 NH75	MBA-I	18.24	670 m	multiple	2002–2018	15 Dec 2018	33	Disc.: NEAT	MPC · JPL
0	2002 NR75	MBA-I	19.2	430 m	multiple	2002–2019	25 Sep 2019	47	Disc.: NEAT	MPC · JPL
0	2002 NZ75	MBA-I	18.8	520 m	multiple	2002–2020	23 May 2020	86	Disc.: NEAT; Alt.: 2006 UU83	MPC · JPL
0	2002 NO76	MBA-M	17.34	2.1 km	multiple	2002–2021	14 Apr 2021	76	Disc.: NEAT; Alt.: 2010 GT82	MPC · JPL
0	2002 NV76	MBA-O	17.2	2.0 km	multiple	2002–2018	11 Aug 2018	34	Disc.: NEAT	MPC · JPL
0	2002 NL77	MBA-M	18.0	750 m	multiple	2002–2019	31 Aug 2019	21	Disc.: NEAT	MPC · JPL
0	2002 NZ77	MBA-M	18.51	830 m	multiple	2002–2019	02 Oct 2019	44	Disc.: NEAT	MPC · JPL
1	2002 NK79	MBA-O	16.8	2.4 km	multiple	2002–2018	05 Aug 2018	30	Disc.: NEAT	MPC · JPL
1	2002 NU80	MBA-M	17.7	860 m	multiple	2002–2017	28 Mar 2017	19	Disc.: NEAT	MPC · JPL
1	2002 NO81	MBA-I	18.7	540 m	multiple	2002–2016	19 Nov 2016	33	Disc.: NEAT	MPC · JPL
0	2002 NX81	MBA-O	17.48	1.8 km	multiple	2002-2024	28 Nov 2024	84	Disc.: NEAT	MPC · JPL
2	2002 NG82	MBA-M	18.1	750 m	multiple	2002-2019	17 Dec 2019	29	Disc.: NEAT	MPC · JPL
0	2002 NK82	MBA-O	17.5	1.8 km	multiple	2002–2018	11 Aug 2018	44	Disc.: NEAT	MPC · JPL
2	2002 NL82	MBA-M	18.41	650 m	multiple	2002-2023	12 Dec2023	27	Disc.: NEAT	MPC · JPL
0	2002 NX82	MBA-M	18.6	570 m	multiple	2002–2019	27 Nov 2019	48	Disc.: NEAT	MPC · JPL
0	2002 NB83	MBA-M	17.4	980 m	multiple	2002–2015	04 Dec 2015	26	Disc.: NEAT	MPC · JPL
1	2002 NE83	MBA-M	17.7	860 m	multiple	2002–2019	07 Oct 2019	30	Disc.: NEAT	MPC · JPL
1	2002 NM83	MBA-M	18.0	750 m	multiple	2002–2020	21 Jan 2020	49	Disc.: NEAT; Alt.: 2014 OE380	MPC · JPL
0	2002 NX83	MBA-I	18.2	680 m	multiple	2002–2017	22 Oct 2017	40	Disc.: LPL/Spacewatch II	MPC · JPL
0	2002 ND84	MBA-O	17.4	1.8 km	multiple	2002–2019	24 Oct 2019	37	Disc.: LPL/Spacewatch II	MPC · JPL
0	2002 NF84	MBA-M	18.2	960 m	multiple	2002–2019	29 Sep 2019	32	Disc.: LPL/Spacewatch II; Added on 22 July 2020	MPC · JPL

back to top

== O ==
U	Designation	Class	Physical		Observations				Description and notes	Ref
U	Designation	Class	H	D	Opp.	Arc	Last	Used	Description and notes	Ref
2	2002 OL15	MBA-O	18.51	1.1 km	multiple	2002-2021	30 Sep 2021	47	Disc.: LINEAR	MPC · JPL
0	2002 OJ21	MCA	18.1	710 m	multiple	2002–2017	27 Mar 2017	86	Disc.: NEAT	MPC · JPL
4	2002 OX21	MCA	19.2	800 m	single	68 days	21 Sep 2002	37	Disc.: NEAT	MPC · JPL
0	2002 OY21	APO	20.73	250 m	multiple	2002–2021	03 Aug 2021	70	Disc.: NEAT	MPC · JPL
0	2002 OC25	MBA-M	18.0	750 m	multiple	2002–2019	31 Oct 2019	62	Disc.: NEAT; Alt.: 2014 KS52	MPC · JPL
1	2002 OT25	MBA-M	18.1	710 m	multiple	2002–2018	15 Apr 2018	44	Disc.: NEAT	MPC · JPL
0	2002 OL26	MBA-I	19.30	410 m	multiple	2002–2021	30 Nov 2021	48	Disc.: NEAT	MPC · JPL
1	2002 OS27	MBA-M	17.79	860 m	multiple	2002-2022	24 Jul 2022	52	Disc.: NEAT; Alt.: 2010 GQ17	MPC · JPL
1	2002 OJ28	MBA-I	18.9	490 m	multiple	2002–2021	19 May 2021	39	Disc.: NEAT; Alt.: 2012 TW189	MPC · JPL
0	2002 OY31	MBA-I	18.5	590 m	multiple	2002–2019	21 Sep 2019	49	Disc.: NEAT	MPC · JPL
0	2002 OE32	MBA-M	18.0	1.1 km	multiple	2002–2019	02 Oct 2019	25	Disc.: NEAT	MPC · JPL
0	2002 OD33	MBA-I	19.1	450 m	multiple	2002–2020	15 Oct 2020	60	Disc.: NEAT	MPC · JPL
0	2002 OC34	MBA-M	18.4	880 m	multiple	2002–2019	29 Sep 2019	50	Disc.: NEAT	MPC · JPL
2	2002 OB35	MBA-I	18.5	590 m	multiple	2001–2014	28 Oct 2014	34	Disc.: NEAT; Alt.: 2010 RF106	MPC · JPL
1	2002 OG35	MBA-M	19.5	370 m	multiple	2001–2006	21 Jul 2006	21	Disc.: NEAT	MPC · JPL
0	2002 OK35	MBA-I	18.9	490 m	multiple	2002–2020	23 Oct 2020	76	Disc.: NEAT	MPC · JPL
0	2002 OB36	MBA-I	18.3	650 m	multiple	2002–2020	14 Nov 2020	161	Disc.: NEAT	MPC · JPL
0	2002 OG37	MBA-I	18.8	520 m	multiple	2002–2020	27 Jun 2020	24	Disc.: NEAT	MPC · JPL
0	2002 OR37	MBA-I	18.87	520 m	multiple	2002–2023	13 Sep 2023	88	Disc.: NEAT; Alt.: 2016 QS2	MPC · JPL
1	2002 OW37	MBA-M	17.2	1.1 km	multiple	2002–2020	04 Jan 2020	41	Disc.: AMOS; Alt.: 2013 ER72	MPC · JPL
0	2002 OH38	MBA-O	17.2	2.0 km	multiple	2002–2018	13 Aug 2018	23	Disc.: NEAT	MPC · JPL
2	2002 OL38	MBA-M	19.0	670 m	multiple	2002–2019	25 Sep 2019	35	Disc.: NEAT	MPC · JPL

back to top
