= List of unnumbered minor planets: 2003 A–E =

This is a partial list of unnumbered minor planets for principal provisional designations assigned between 1 January and 15 March 2003. As of November 2025, a total of 127 bodies remain unnumbered for this period. Objects for this year are listed on the following pages: A–E · F–G · H–L · M–R · S_{i} · S_{ii} · S_{iii} · S_{iv} · T · U_{i} · U_{ii} · U_{iii} · U_{iv} · V · W_{i} · W_{ii} and X–Y. Also see previous and next year.

Near-Earth obj.	MBA (inner)	MBA (outer)	Centaur
Mars-crosser	MBA (middle)	Jupiter trojan	Trans-Neptunian obj.
Unclassified

== A ==
U	Designation	Class	Physical		Observations				Description and notes	Ref
U	Designation	Class	H	D	Opp.	Arc	Last	Used	Description and notes	Ref
5	2003 AC1	AMO	20.7	260 m	single	87 days	29 Mar 2003	55	Disc.: LINEAR	MPC · JPL
0	2003 AM4	AMO	21.22	200 m	multiple	2002–2021	10 Jan 2021	71	Disc.: LINEAR	MPC · JPL
1	2003 AU4	MBA-O	17.39	1.9 km	multiple	2003–2021	28 Sep 2021	47	Disc.: VATT	MPC · JPL
0	2003 AP9	MBA-M	18.5	840 m	multiple	2003–2020	31 Jan 2020	61	Disc.: LPL/Spacewatch II	MPC · JPL
0	2003 AZ16	MBA-I	17.7	860 m	multiple	2003–2021	17 Jan 2021	140	Disc.: LINEAR; Alt.: 2010 CQ210	MPC · JPL
1	2003 AB23	APO	19.9	370 m	multiple	2002–2009	23 Feb 2009	80	Disc.: LINEAR	MPC · JPL
1	2003 AC23	APO	21.9	150 m	multiple	2003–2019	20 Jan 2019	85	Disc.: LINEAR; Potentially hazardous object	MPC · JPL
0	2003 AF23	ATE	21.02	220 m	multiple	2003–2021	23 Feb 2021	460	Disc.: LINEAR; Potentially hazardous object	MPC · JPL
8	2003 AS42	APO	25.3	31 m	single	3 days	11 Jan 2003	36	Disc.: LINEAR	MPC · JPL
7	2003 AJ69	APO	24.9	37 m	single	13 days	23 Jan 2003	31	Disc.: LINEAR	MPC · JPL
0	2003 AU72	MBA-I	18.2	680 m	multiple	2003–2017	26 Apr 2017	45	Disc.: LINEAR	MPC · JPL
3	2003 AK73	APO	19.5	450 m	multiple	2003–2007	26 Jan 2007	49	Disc.: NEAT	MPC · JPL
–	2003 AA83	APO	22.8	98 m	single	6 days	19 Jan 2003	20	Disc.: LINEAR	MPC · JPL
0	2003 AR83	MBA-M	18.84	840 m	multiple	2003-2025	25 Feb 2025	55	Disc.: Kitt Peak Obs.	MPC · JPL
1	2003 AW83	MBA-O	18.4	1.2 km	multiple	2003–2021	06 Nov 2021	31	Disc.: Kitt Peak Obs.	MPC · JPL
2	2003 AA93	MBA-I	19.16	450 m	multiple	2003-2024	24 Oct 2024	49	Disc.: La Silla Obs. Alt.: 2024 RG102	MPC · JPL
0	2003 AE93	MBA-M	18.6	730 m	multiple	2003-2025	24 Feb 2025	36	Disc.: La Silla Obs.	MPC · JPL
6	2003 AR93	JT	15.87	4.0 km	multiple	2003-2025	28 Oct 2025	24	Disc.: La Silla Obs. Trojan camp (L5)	MPC · JPL
4	2003 AS93	MBA-O	19.03	1.0 km	multiple	2003-2013	13 Sep 2013	18	Disc.: La Silla Obs.	Alt.: 2013 RG184 MPC · JPL
0	2003 AP95	MBA-I	18.98	480 m	multiple	2003–2022	27 Jan 2022	26	Disc.: LPL/Spacewatch II	MPC · JPL
2	2003 AU95	HIL	16.6	2.7 km	multiple	2003–2020	19 Apr 2020	28	Disc.: LPL/Spacewatch II	MPC · JPL

back to top

== B ==
U	Designation	Class	Physical		Observations				Description and notes	Ref
U	Designation	Class	H	D	Opp.	Arc	Last	Used	Description and notes	Ref
2	2003 BK1	MCA	18.56	840 m	multiple	2003-2024	19 Feb 2024	48	Disc.: LINEAR	MPC · JPL
1	2003 BM1	MBA-O	18.2	1.3 km	multiple	2003–2017	05 Feb 2017	86	Disc.: NEAT	MPC · JPL
0	2003 BN1	APO	20.47	290 m	multiple	2003-2024	12 Jan 2024	109	Disc.: LONEOS	MPC · JPL
0	2003 BT1	MBA-M	18.4	880 m	multiple	2003–2020	22 Mar 2020	82	Disc.: VATT	MPC · JPL
0	2003 BM4	APO	24.99	40 m	multiple	2003-2024	19 Jan 2024	61	Disc.: LONEOS	MPC · JPL
0	2003 BN4	AMO	24.0	56 m	multiple	2002–2013	26 Feb 2013	102	Disc.: LPL/Spacewatch II	MPC · JPL
0	2003 BA5	MBA-M	18.5	840 m	multiple	1999–2020	23 Mar 2020	70	Disc.: La Silla Obs. Alt.: 2016 EL163	MPC · JPL
0	2003 BR5	MBA-M	17.6	1.3 km	multiple	2003–2019	24 Dec 2019	51	Disc.: La Silla Obs.	MPC · JPL
0	2003 BL15	MBA-M	17.75	1.6 km	multiple	2003–2021	09 May 2021	200	Disc.: AMOS	MPC · JPL
0	2003 BY20	MBA-M	17.86	1.8 km	multiple	2003-2024	30 Sep 2024	46	Disc.: VATT	MPC · JPL
0	2003 BB21	APO	20.9	230 m	multiple	2003–2013	28 Mar 2013	115	Disc.: LINEAR; Potentially hazardous object	MPC · JPL
7	2003 BW33	APO	21.3	200 m	single	46 days	14 Mar 2003	41	Disc.: LINEAR	MPC · JPL
–	2003 BG34	MBA-I	19.1	450 m	single	5 days	01 Feb 2003	12	Disc.: VATT	MPC · JPL
7	2003 BS35	APO	24.7	41 m	single	11 days	07 Feb 2003	13	Disc.: AMOS	MPC · JPL
7	2003 BV_{35}	APO	22.1	140 m	single	11 days	09 Feb 2003	118	Disc.: Table Mountain Obs.	MPC · JPL
0	2003 BW37	MBA-M	18.4	880 m	multiple	2003–2020	26 Jan 2020	28	Disc.: LPL/Spacewatch II; Alt.: 2016 CC53	MPC · JPL
1	2003 BR41	MBA-O	17.5	1.8 km	multiple	2003–2020	02 Feb 2020	32	Disc.: LPL/Spacewatch II	MPC · JPL
7	2003 BC44	APO	25.5	28 m	single	2 days	31 Jan 2003	9	Disc.: LPL/Spacewatch II	MPC · JPL
2	2003 BB46	MCA	18.3	650 m	multiple	2003–2020	08 Aug 2020	74	Disc.: LPL/Spacewatch II	MPC · JPL
4	2003 BC46	AMO	23.6	68 m	single	89 days	24 Apr 2003	27	Disc.: La Silla Obs.	MPC · JPL
0	2003 BL47	MCA	17.2	1.1 km	multiple	1999–2020	26 Jan 2020	32	Disc.: LINEAR; Alt.: 1999 CA11	MPC · JPL
2	2003 BR47	APO	21.4	190 m	multiple	2000–2003	25 Mar 2003	162	Disc.: LINEAR; Potentially hazardous object	MPC · JPL
7	2003 BS47	APO	25.8	25 m	single	2 days	02 Feb 2003	11	Disc.: LINEAR; AMO at MPC	MPC · JPL
0	2003 BQ54	MBA-I	17.8	820 m	multiple	2002–2016	04 Apr 2016	78	Disc.: LPL/Spacewatch II; Alt.: 2014 QT94	MPC · JPL
0	2003 BH91	TNO	11.9	14 km	single	13 days	08 Feb 2003	12	Disc.: Hubble Telescope; LoUTNOs, cubewano?	MPC · JPL
E	2003 BF91	TNO	11.7	16 km	single	13 days	08 Feb 2003	10	Disc.: Hubble Telescope; LoUTNOs, cubewano?	MPC · JPL
E	2003 BG91	TNO	10.7	25 km	single	92 days	29 Apr 2003	13	Disc.: Hubble Telescope; LoUTNOs, cubewano?	MPC · JPL
E	2003 BH91	TNO	11.9	14 km	single	13 days	08 Feb 2003	12	Disc.: Hubble Telescope; LoUTNOs, cubewano?	MPC · JPL
0	2003 BW92	MBA-O	16.83	2.4 km	multiple	2003–2021	28 Aug 2021	76	Disc.: LPL/Spacewatch II; Added on 22 July 2020; Alt.: 2016 QT51	MPC · JPL
0	2003 BV96	MBA-I	18.08	720 m	multiple	2003–2022	27 Jan 2022	68	Disc.: SDSS	MPC · JPL
0	2003 BG98	MBA-M	17.8	1.5 km	multiple	2003–2021	22 Jan 2021	48	Disc.: SDSS	MPC · JPL
0	2003 BQ98	MBA-I	18.82	510 m	multiple	2003–2021	09 Dec 2021	48	Disc.: LPL/Spacewatch II	MPC · JPL
0	2003 BT98	MBA-O	16.99	2.2 km	multiple	2003–2021	06 Dec 2021	92	Disc.: SDSS	MPC · JPL
0	2003 BA99	MBA-I	18.95	480 m	multiple	2003–2021	13 Apr 2021	34	Disc.: SDSS	MPC · JPL
0	2003 BO99	MBA-I	19.31	410 m	multiple	1995–2021	08 Sep 2021	56	Disc.: La Silla Obs.	MPC · JPL
0	2003 BT99	MBA-I	18.5	590 m	multiple	1998–2019	01 Nov 2019	55	Disc.: SDSS; Alt.: 2012 TX376, 2012 UZ235	MPC · JPL
0	2003 BA100	MBA-M	18.76	740 m	multiple	2003–2019	02 Nov 2019	37	Disc.: SDSS	MPC · JPL
0	2003 BE100	MBA-I	18.7	540 m	multiple	2003–2019	24 Sep 2019	33	Disc.: SDSS	MPC · JPL
0	2003 BF100	MBA-O	17.3	1.9 km	multiple	2003–2019	10 Mar 2019	48	Disc.: LPL/Spacewatch II	MPC · JPL
0	2003 BM100	MBA-I	19.03	460 m	multiple	2003–2021	03 Apr 2021	31	Disc.: SDSS	MPC · JPL
1	2003 BQ100	MBA-M	18.51	590 m	multiple	2003–2021	31 Aug 2021	26	Disc.: SDSS	MPC · JPL
0	2003 BD101	MBA-O	17.9	1.5 km	multiple	2003–2019	05 Feb 2019	42	Disc.: SDSS	MPC · JPL
1	2003 BT101	MBA-I	18.5	590 m	multiple	2003–2019	29 Oct 2019	48	Disc.: SDSS	MPC · JPL
0	2003 BY102	MBA-I	18.9	490 m	multiple	2003–2019	10 Jan 2019	30	Disc.: SDSS	MPC · JPL
0	2003 BZ102	MBA-M	18.0	1.1 km	multiple	2003–2020	30 Jan 2020	36	Disc.: SDSS	MPC · JPL
2	2003 BA103	MBA-O	17.8	1.5 km	multiple	2003–2018	20 Jan 2018	27	Disc.: LPL/Spacewatch II	MPC · JPL
0	2003 BD103	MBA-I	19.0	470 m	multiple	2003–2018	23 Jan 2018	24	Disc.: SDSS	MPC · JPL
0	2003 BF103	MBA-I	18.7	540 m	multiple	2003–2018	20 Feb 2018	36	Disc.: SDSS; Added on 19 October 2020	MPC · JPL
0	2003 BK103	MBA-O	17.4	1.8 km	multiple	2003–2020	16 Mar 2020	17	Disc.: LPL/Spacewatch II; Added on 9 March 2021	MPC · JPL
1	2003 BO103	MBA-M	18.3	1.2 km	multiple	1999–2021	06 Mar 2021	29	Disc.: No observations Added on 11 May 2021	MPC · JPL
0	2003 BP103	MBA-I	19.1	450 m	multiple	2003–2021	01 May 2021	33	Disc.: LPL/Spacewatch II; Added on 17 June 2021	MPC · JPL
0	2003 BR103	MBA-M	17.6	1.7 km	multiple	2003–2018	16 Jul 2018	26	Disc.: La Silla Obs. Added on 21 August 2021	MPC · JPL

back to top

== C ==
U	Designation	Class	Physical		Observations				Description and notes	Ref
U	Designation	Class	H	D	Opp.	Arc	Last	Used	Description and notes	Ref
1	2003 CG	MBA-O	18.2	1.3 km	multiple	2003–2020	24 Jun 2020	90	Disc.: NEAT	MPC · JPL
1	2003 CH	MBA-M	17.62	890 m	multiple	2003–2021	08 Sep 2021	38	Disc.: NEAT; Alt.: 2007 BN2	MPC · JPL
0	2003 CK	MCA	18.6	570 m	multiple	2002–2020	22 Aug 2020	98	Disc.: AMOS	MPC · JPL
3	2003 CA4	ATE	23.6	68 m	multiple	2003–2018	10 Feb 2018	166	Disc.: AMOS	MPC · JPL
0	2003 CC11	AMO	19.1	1.1 km	multiple	2003–2014	20 Feb 2014	94	Disc.: LINEAR	MPC · JPL
0	2003 CG11	APO	20.5	280 m	multiple	2003–2007	11 Aug 2007	81	Disc.: LONEOS; Potentially hazardous object	MPC · JPL
1	2003 CM11	MBA-O	17.6	1.7 km	multiple	2003–2008	03 Mar 2008	44	Disc.: AMOS	MPC · JPL
1	2003 CL18	APO	20.6	270 m	multiple	2002–2007	22 Feb 2007	46	Disc.: NEAT	MPC · JPL
9	2003 CO20	APO	23.1	85 m	single	7 days	18 Feb 2003	31	Disc.: LINEAR	MPC · JPL
0	2003 CQ20	AMO	20.4	300 m	multiple	2003–2006	22 Mar 2006	158	Disc.: LONEOS	MPC · JPL
0	2003 CS20	MCA	18.66	0.8 km	multiple	2003–2022	06 Jul 2022	121	Disc.: La Silla Obs.	MPC · JPL
0	2003 CO22	MBA-I	19.1	450 m	multiple	2003–2020	09 Dec 2020	25	Disc.: Astrovirtel; Added on 17 June 2021	MPC · JPL
1	2003 CG23	MBA-O	17.0	2.2 km	multiple	2003–2021	04 Apr 2021	30	Disc.: Astrovirtel	MPC · JPL
0	2003 CV23	MBA-I	18.3	650 m	multiple	2003–2019	29 Jul 2019	25	Disc.: Astrovirtel; Added on 22 July 2020	MPC · JPL
1	2003 CX23	MBA-I	18.8	520 m	multiple	2003–2020	15 Aug 2020	22	Disc.: Astrovirtel	MPC · JPL
0	2003 CK27	HUN	19.4	390 m	multiple	2003–2018	06 Jan 2018	30	Disc.: SDSS	MPC · JPL
0	2003 CN27	MBA-M	18.2	960 m	multiple	2003–2020	19 Jan 2020	30	Disc.: Astrovirtel	MPC · JPL
0	2003 CO27	MBA-M	17.9	780 m	multiple	2003–2020	24 Mar 2020	26	Disc.: SDSS	MPC · JPL
1	2003 CP27	MBA-I	17.7	860 m	multiple	2003–2019	22 Oct 2019	25	Disc.: NEAT	MPC · JPL
1	2003 CY27	MBA-I	18.3	650 m	multiple	2003–2019	24 Oct 2019	34	Disc.: SDSS	MPC · JPL
1	2003 CZ27	MBA-I	18.86	500 m	multiple	2003–2021	09 Nov 2021	35	Disc.: SDSS	MPC · JPL
1	2003 CM28	MBA-I	20.1	280 m	multiple	2003–2020	02 Apr 2020	24	Disc.: LPL/Spacewatch II; Added on 9 March 2021	MPC · JPL

back to top

== D ==
U	Designation	Class	Physical		Observations				Description and notes	Ref
U	Designation	Class	H	D	Opp.	Arc	Last	Used	Description and notes	Ref
0	2003 DJ	MBA-I	18.6	570 m	multiple	2003–2018	20 Apr 2018	48	Disc.: NEAT	MPC · JPL
3	2003 DM4	MCA	19.1	450 m	multiple	2003–2007	15 May 2007	51	Disc.: NEAT	MPC · JPL
1	2003 DF6	APO	21.2	200 m	multiple	2003–2007	17 Feb 2007	167	Disc.: NEAT; AMO at MPC	MPC · JPL
0	2003 DG6	APO	20.7	260 m	multiple	2003–2020	24 Mar 2020	78	Disc.: LINEAR	MPC · JPL
6	2003 DH6	APO	24.3	49 m	single	8 days	03 Mar 2003	97	Disc.: LONEOS; AMO at MPC	MPC · JPL
4	2003 DW10	APO	26.1	21 m	single	161 days	06 Aug 2003	114	Disc.: LINEAR	MPC · JPL
6	2003 DY15	APO	26.3	20 m	single	5 days	05 Mar 2003	54	Disc.: AMOS	MPC · JPL
0	2003 DZ15	APO	22.3	120 m	multiple	2003–2017	21 Jun 2017	191	Disc.: AMOS	MPC · JPL
–	2003 DB16	MBA-I	19.6	360 m	single	6 days	28 Feb 2003	16	Disc.: KLENOT	MPC · JPL
0	2003 DF16	APO	20.08	340 m	multiple	2003–2021	04 Nov 2021	133	Disc.: LINEAR; AMO at MPC	MPC · JPL
1	2003 DV22	MBA-I	18.7	540 m	multiple	2003–2015	21 Aug 2015	19	Disc.: Cerro Tololo; Added on 21 August 2021	MPC · JPL
0	2003 DL25	MBA-I	18.6	570 m	multiple	2003–2018	19 Mar 2018	33	Disc.: CINEOS	MPC · JPL
9	2003 DU25	AMO	25.23	32 m	single	1 day	25 Feb 2003	10	Disc.: Mauna Kea Obs. Added on 21 August 2021	MPC · JPL

back to top

== E ==
U	Designation	Class	Physical		Observations				Description and notes	Ref
U	Designation	Class	H	D	Opp.	Arc	Last	Used	Description and notes	Ref
4	2003 EM1	ATE	24.5	45 m	single	8 days	13 Mar 2003	227	Disc.: Črni Vrh Obs.	MPC · JPL
0	2003 EP4	APO	23.92	58 m	multiple	2003–2009	09 Nov 2009	83	Disc.: LINEAR	MPC · JPL
0	2003 EG16	APO	19.3	490 m	multiple	2003–2014	16 Sep 2014	137	Disc.: LINEAR; Potentially hazardous object	MPC · JPL
0	2003 EH16	AMO	20.39	300 m	multiple	2003–2021	09 Apr 2021	176	Disc.: NEAT	MPC · JPL
6	2003 EP16	AMO	23.0	89 m	single	21 days	30 Mar 2003	31	Disc.: LPL/Spacewatch II	MPC · JPL
–	2003 EQ16	MBA-I	17.8	820 m	single	20 days	26 Mar 2003	10	Disc.: LONEOS	MPC · JPL
0	2003 EZ16	APO	22.81	110 m	multiple	2003–2026	17 Mar 2026	106	Disc.: Spacewatch; AMO at MPC	MPC · JPL
2	2003 EC50	APO	22.9	93 m	single	13 days	23 Mar 2003	34	Disc.: NEAT	MPC · JPL
1	2003 EZ50	MBA-I	18.4	620 m	multiple	2003–2019	20 Dec 2019	67	Disc.: NEAT; Alt.: 2017 FJ76	MPC · JPL
–	2003 EH51	HUN	22.3	100 m	single	5 days	13 Mar 2003	9	Disc.: Spacewatch	MPC · JPL
0	2003 EK51	MBA-M	17.9	1.1 km	multiple	2003–2020	20 May 2020	42	Disc.: NEAT	MPC · JPL
0	2003 EM56	MBA-M	17.6	1.3 km	multiple	2003–2020	13 Aug 2020	211	Disc.: NEAT; Alt.: 2020 EL	MPC · JPL
4	2003 EJ59	AMO	19.9	370 m	single	40 days	21 Apr 2003	166	Disc.: LINEAR	MPC · JPL
7	2003 EW59	APO	23.3	78 m	single	14 days	26 Mar 2003	45	Disc.: LINEAR	MPC · JPL
0	2003 EF65	HUN	18.8	520 m	multiple	2003–2019	09 Feb 2019	22	Disc.: SDSS	MPC · JPL
0	2003 EJ65	MBA-O	16.9	2.3 km	multiple	2003–2019	08 Apr 2019	35	Disc.: LONEOS	MPC · JPL
0	2003 EM65	MBA-I	18.74	530 m	multiple	2003–2021	08 May 2021	71	Disc.: Kitt Peak Obs. Added on 22 July 2020	MPC · JPL
0	2003 EO65	MCA	20.70	220 m	multiple	2003–2021	27 Dec 2021	26	Disc.: LPL/Spacewatch II; Added on 17 January 2021	MPC · JPL
0	2003 EQ65	MBA-I	18.8	520 m	multiple	2003–2021	08 May 2021	51	Disc.: LPL/Spacewatch II; Added on 30 September 2021	MPC · JPL

back to top
