= List of unnumbered minor planets: 2002 A–B =

This is a partial list of unnumbered minor planets for principal provisional designations assigned during 1–31 January 2002. As of March 2026, a total of 81 bodies remain unnumbered for this period. Objects for this year are listed on the following pages: A–B · C · D–F · G–K · L–O · P · Q_{i} · Q_{ii} · R_{i} · R_{ii} · S · T_{i} · T_{ii} · U–V and W–Y. Also see previous and next year.

Near-Earth obj.	MBA (inner)	MBA (outer)	Centaur
Mars-crosser	MBA (middle)	Jupiter trojan	Trans-Neptunian obj.
Unclassified

== A ==
U	Designation	Class	Physical		Observations				Description and notes	Ref
U	Designation	Class	H	D	Opp.	Arc	Last	Used	Description and notes	Ref
1	2002 AV	APO	20.9	230 m	multiple	2002–2005	11 Jul 2005	211	Disc.: LINEAR; Potentially hazardous object	MPC · JPL
0	2002 AY_{1}	ATE	20.94	230 m	multiple	2002–2014	20 Dec 2014	115	Disc.: LINEAR; Potentially hazardous object	MPC · JPL
–	2002 AZ1	APO	21.4	190 m	single	35 days	11 Feb 2002	69	Disc.: Spacewatch; Potentially hazardous object	MPC · JPL
0	2002 AA2	AMO	20.5	280 m	multiple	2002–2019	12 Mar 2019	109	Disc.: AMOS	MPC · JPL
2	2002 AB2	ATE	23.31	77 m	multiple	2002–2021	07 Dec 2021	50	Disc.: LINEAR	MPC · JPL
0	2002 AQ2	AMO	18.6	680 m	multiple	2001–2015	10 Apr 2015	164	Disc.: LINEAR	MPC · JPL
1	2002 AY3	AMO	20.7	260 m	multiple	2002–2016	03 Sep 2016	92	Disc.: LINEAR	MPC · JPL
0	2002 AR4	AMO	19.99	360 m	multiple	2002-2023	12 May 2023	48	Disc.: LINEAR	MPC · JPL
1	2002 AS4	APO	22.24	120 m	multiple	2002-2024	05 Jan 2024	50	Disc.: LINEAR; Potentially hazardous object	MPC · JPL
0	2002 AT4	AMO	21.2	200 m	multiple	2001–2006	27 Nov 2006	195	Disc.: LINEAR; Potentially hazardous object	MPC · JPL
0	2002 AS5	MCA	19.97	410 m	multiple	2002-2024	26 Dec 2024	98	Disc.: NEAT	MPC · JPL
0	2002 AW5	MCA	19.44	380 m	multiple	2001–2022	08 Jan 2022	72	Disc.: LINEAR	MPC · JPL
0	2002 AC9	APO	21.13	210 m	multiple	2002–2022	27 Jan 2022	89	Disc.: LINEAR; Potentially hazardous object	MPC · JPL
2	2002 AO11	ATE	23.05	175 m	multiple	2002–2016	10 Jan 2016	22	Disc.: LINEAR	MPC · JPL
3	2002 AK14	APO	21.5	180 m	multiple	2000–2002	28 Dec 2002	49	Disc.: LINEAR	MPC · JPL
E	2002 AV14	MBA-M	19.0	670 m	single	3 days	14 Jan 2002	17	Disc.: Cerro Tololo	MPC · JPL
0	2002 AP18	HUN	18.99	470 m	multiple	2002–2022	09 Jan 2022	47	Disc.: LPL/Spacewatch II; Added on 24 December 2021	MPC · JPL
2	2002 AA29	ATE	24.1	54 m	multiple	2002–2004	15 Jan 2004	63	Disc.: LINEAR	MPC · JPL
8	2002 AD29	APO	21.0	220 m	single	11 days	19 Jan 2002	25	Disc.: LINEAR	MPC · JPL
7	2002 AE29	APO	24.6	43 m	single	5 days	18 Jan 2002	20	Disc.: LINEAR	MPC · JPL
1	2002 AF29	AMO	19.2	510 m	multiple	2001–2008	27 May 2008	126	Disc.: AMOS	MPC · JPL
2	2002 AH29	AMO	21.5	180 m	single	111 days	05 May 2002	126	Disc.: LINEAR	MPC · JPL
0	2002 AP30	MBA-I	17.9	780 m	multiple	2002–2020	19 Oct 2020	42	Disc.: LINEAR; Alt.: 2014 YF38	MPC · JPL
7	2002 AL31	APO	24.5	45 m	single	8 days	22 Jan 2002	58	Disc.: NEAT	MPC · JPL
0	2002 AN31	MCA	18.27	670 m	multiple	2002–2023	01 Apr 2023	83	Disc.: LINEAR	MPC · JPL
1	2002 AT31	MCA	20.6	230 m	multiple	2001–2019	06 Apr 2019	50	Disc.: LINEAR	MPC · JPL
1	2002 AW31	MBA-M	17.95	1.1 km	multiple	2002-2023	18 Mar 2023	34	Disc.: LINEAR	MPC · JPL
1	2002 AX31	MCA	19.6	350 m	multiple	2002-2024	28 Apr 2024	53	Disc.: NEAT; Alt.: 2014 WT51	MPC · JPL
2	2002 AP33	MBA-I	18.2	680 m	multiple	2002–2019	04 Feb 2019	40	Disc.: Spacewatch	MPC · JPL
1	2002 AY33	MBA-M	18.43	920 m	multiple	2001–2024	01 May 2024	52	Disc.: Spacewatch; Alt.: 2015 AA88	MPC · JPL
0	2002 AE68	MBA-I	18.8	520 m	multiple	2001–2021	11 Feb 2021	20	Disc.: LPL/Spacewatch II; Added on 5 November 2021	MPC · JPL
0	2002 AQ68	MBA-I	18.4	620 m	multiple	2002–2021	05 May 2021	49	Disc.: Spacewatch	MPC · JPL
1	2002 AJ69	APO	21.22	200 m	multiple	2002-2026	24 May 2026	28	Disc.: LINEAR	MPC · JPL
0	2002 AN69	MBA-M	17.2	1.5 km	multiple	2002–2020	09 Jun 2020	48	Disc.: NEAT	MPC · JPL
1	2002 AR91	JT	15.12	4.0 km	multiple	2002-2025	22 Feb 2025	44	Disc.: Cerro Tololo; Added on 21 August 2021; Greek camp (L4)	MPC · JPL
E	2002 AH92	JT	15.2	5.1 km	single	2 days	14 Jan 2002	14	Disc.: Cerro Tololo; Greek camp (L4)	MPC · JPL
0	2002 AK92	JT	15.2	5.1 km	multiple	2002-2025	01 Mar 2025	42	Disc.: Cerro Tololo; Greek camp (L4)	MPC · JPL
0	2002 AO92	MBA-O	17.55	1.7 km	multiple	2002–2021	08 Dec 2021	55	Disc.: Cerro Tololo; Added on 24 December 2021	MPC · JPL
2	2002 AV92	MBA-I	18.50	590 m	multiple	2002–2021	27 Sep 2021	48	Disc.: Cerro Tololo; Added on 21 August 2021	MPC · JPL
–	2002 AZ92	MBA-O	17.6	1.7 km	single	4 days	15 Jan 2002	15	Disc.: Cerro Tololo	MPC · JPL
2	2002 AB93	MBA-M	18.46	650 m	multiple	2002-2023	18 Mar 2023	31	Disc.: Cerro Tololo	MPC · JPL
9	2002 AN129	APO	26.2	20 m	single	2 days	15 Jan 2002	10	Disc.: LINEAR	MPC · JPL
0	2002 AN191	MBA-I	19.30	410 m	multiple	2002–2021	02 Oct 2021	49	Disc.: CINEOS	MPC · JPL
0	2002 AF201	MBA-M	17.6	1.3 km	multiple	2000–2020	25 Jan 2020	37	Disc.: LINEAR	MPC · JPL
0	2002 AA206	MBA-O	16.96	2.3 km	multiple	2002–2019	17 Jan 2019	30	Disc.: SDSS; Added on 24 December 2021	MPC · JPL
0	2002 AP211	MBA-I	18.0	750 m	multiple	2002–2021	12 Jun 2021	118	Disc.: SDSS	MPC · JPL
0	2002 AG213	MBA-O	17.1	2.1 km	multiple	2002–2018	20 Jan 2018	37	Disc.: SDSS; Alt.: 2016 QJ95	MPC · JPL
0	2002 AO213	MBA-O	17.1	2.1 km	multiple	2002–2019	09 Apr 2019	31	Disc.: SDSS	MPC · JPL
0	2002 AQ213	MBA-O	17.1	2.1 km	multiple	2002–2019	11 Feb 2019	37	Disc.: SDSS	MPC · JPL
0	2002 AV213	MBA-O	17.17	2.0 km	multiple	2002–2021	12 Aug 2021	32	Disc.: Spacewatch	MPC · JPL
1	2002 AW213	MBA-O	17.3	1.9 km	multiple	2002–2013	10 Feb 2013	22	Disc.: SDSS	MPC · JPL
0	2002 AV214	MBA-I	18.8	520 m	multiple	2002–2019	29 Oct 2019	51	Disc.: SDSS	MPC · JPL
0	2002 AX214	MBA-M	18.1	1.3 km	multiple	2002–2019	25 Nov 2019	44	Disc.: LPL/Spacewatch II	MPC · JPL
0	2002 AC215	MBA-M	18.1	1.0 km	multiple	2002–2020	17 Jul 2020	54	Disc.: LPL/Spacewatch II	MPC · JPL
0	2002 AE215	MBA-O	17.1	2.1 km	multiple	2002–2019	10 Jan 2019	34	Disc.: Spacewatch	MPC · JPL
0	2002 AF215	HUN	19.2	430 m	multiple	2002–2019	05 Nov 2019	37	Disc.: SDSS	MPC · JPL
0	2002 AJ215	HUN	19.14	440 m	multiple	2002–2021	14 Jun 2021	60	Disc.: SDSS	MPC · JPL
0	2002 AF216	HUN	18.4	620 m	multiple	2002–2020	23 Dec 2020	43	Disc.: Spacewatch	MPC · JPL
0	2002 AG216	MBA-I	18.6	570 m	multiple	2002–2020	23 Mar 2020	33	Disc.: LPL/Spacewatch II	MPC · JPL
0	2002 AK216	MBA-M	18.25	670 m	multiple	2002–2021	26 Oct 2021	35	Disc.: SDSS	MPC · JPL
0	2002 AO216	MBA-I	19.1	450 m	multiple	2002–2020	21 Feb 2020	43	Disc.: SDSS	MPC · JPL
1	2002 AA217	MBA-O	17.6	1.7 km	multiple	2002–2018	20 Apr 2018	33	Disc.: SDSS	MPC · JPL
0	2002 AD217	MBA-O	17.50	1.8 km	multiple	2002–2021	30 Aug 2021	53	Disc.: Spacewatch; Added on 19 October 2020	MPC · JPL
0	2002 AF217	MBA-I	18.5	590 m	multiple	2002–2021	15 Feb 2021	51	Disc.: Spacewatch; Added on 17 January 2021	MPC · JPL

back to top

== B ==
U	Designation	Class	Physical		Observations				Description and notes	Ref
U	Designation	Class	H	D	Opp.	Arc	Last	Used	Description and notes	Ref
2	2002 BG	AMO	20.5	280 m	multiple	2002–2008	10 Feb 2008	40	Disc.: LINEAR	MPC · JPL
7	2002 BM	APO	24.1	54 m	single	2 days	21 Jan 2002	23	Disc.: LINEAR; AMO at MPC	MPC · JPL
0	2002 BA1	AMO	21.5	180 m	multiple	2002–2005	16 May 2005	153	Disc.: Spacewatch	MPC · JPL
2	2002 BJ2	APO	17.0	1.4 km	multiple	1996–2017	02 Jun 2017	68	Disc.: Desert Eagle Obs. NEO larger than 1 kilometer	MPC · JPL
6	2002 BM5	AMO	22.3	120 m	single	47 days	11 Mar 2002	29	Disc.: LINEAR	MPC · JPL
0	2002 BF25	APO	22.62	152 m	multiple	2002–2020	18 Jun 2020	98	Disc.: LINEAR	MPC · JPL
0	2002 BG25	APO	20.9	230 m	multiple	2002–2017	15 Feb 2017	114	Disc.: LINEAR	MPC · JPL
0	2002 BM26	APO	20.1	340 m	multiple	2002–2007	29 Jan 2007	239	Disc.: LINEAR; Potentially hazardous object AMO at MPC	MPC · JPL
0	2002 BE33	MBA-M	18.57	570 m	multiple	2002–2021	26 Nov 2021	92	Disc.: LPL/Spacewatch II	MPC · JPL
0	2002 BG33	MBA-I	18.1	710 m	multiple	2002–2016	23 Nov 2016	45	Disc.: LPL/Spacewatch II	MPC · JPL
0	2002 BL33	MBA-O	16.68	2.6 km	multiple	2002–2021	31 Aug 2021	48	Disc.: LPL/Spacewatch II	MPC · JPL
1	2002 BB34 = (887173)	MBA-M	17.92	770 m	multiple	2002–2022	27 Jan 2022	40	Disc.: LPL/Spacewatch II	MPC · JPL
0	2002 BC34	MBA-I	19.0	470 m	multiple	2002–2018	13 Aug 2018	29	Disc.: LPL/Spacewatch II	MPC · JPL
0	2002 BG34	MBA-M	18.59	570 m	multiple	2002–2021	26 Nov 2021	24	Disc.: LPL/Spacewatch II	MPC · JPL
0	2002 BL34	MBA-I	18.9	490 m	multiple	2002–2020	22 Mar 2020	48	Disc.: LPL/Spacewatch II	MPC · JPL
0	2002 BN34	MBA-O	17.71	1.6 km	multiple	2002–2021	25 Nov 2021	41	Disc.: Spacewatch; Added on 21 August 2021	MPC · JPL

back to top
