= List of unnumbered minor planets: 2004 T (0–99) =

This is a partial list of unnumbered minor planets for principal provisional designations assigned during 1–15 October 2004. Since this period yielded a high number of provisional discoveries, it is further split into several standalone pages. As of March 2026, a total of 136 bodies remain unnumbered for this period. Objects for this year are listed on the following pages: A–B · C · D–E · F · G–H · J–O · P–Q · R_{i} · R_{ii} · R_{iii} · S · T_{i} · T_{ii} · T_{iii} · T_{iv} · U–V · W–X and Y. Also see previous and next year.

Near-Earth obj.	MBA (inner)	MBA (outer)	Centaur
Mars-crosser	MBA (middle)	Jupiter trojan	Trans-Neptunian obj.
Unclassified

== T ==
U	Designation	Class	Physical		Observations				Description and notes	Ref
U	Designation	Class	H	D	Opp.	Arc	Last	Used	Description and notes	Ref
0	2004 TO	MBA-I	18.5	590 m	multiple	2000–2019	01 Nov 2019	43	Disc.: Spacewatch	MPC · JPL
3	2004 TA1	ATE	23.0	89 m	multiple	2004–2017	24 Sep 2017	42	Disc.: LONEOS	MPC · JPL
5	2004 TN1	APO	21.8	160 m	single	30 days	04 Nov 2004	63	Disc.: NEAT; Potentially hazardous object	MPC · JPL
2	2004 TO1	MCA	19.5	530 m	multiple	2004–2017	09 Dec 2017	71	Disc.: LONEOS	MPC · JPL
0	2004 TX2	MBA-M	19.57	510 m	multiple	2004–2021	07 Nov 2021	58	Disc.: Spacewatch	MPC · JPL
0	2004 TZ2	MBA-I	18.8	520 m	multiple	2004–2017	12 Sep 2017	60	Disc.: Spacewatch; Alt.: 2014 SX292	MPC · JPL
0	2004 TC3	MBA-I	19.0	470 m	multiple	2004–2020	27 Feb 2020	30	Disc.: Spacewatch	MPC · JPL
1	2004 TJ3	MBA-I	19.1	450 m	multiple	2004–2021	18 Jan 2021	30	Disc.: LPL/Spacewatch II; Alt.: 2012 XA39	MPC · JPL
3	2004 TN3	MBA-O	17.92	1.4 km	multiple	2004-2014	22 Nov 2014	19	Disc.: Spacewatch II	MPC · JPL
0	2004 TQ3	MBA-O	17.2	2.0 km	multiple	2002–2021	30 Nov 2021	64	Disc.: LPL/Spacewatch II; Added on 24 December 2021	MPC · JPL
2	2004 TZ3	MBA-I	19.1	410 m	multiple	2004-2021	10 Aug 2021	29	Disc.: Spacewatch II	MPC · JPL
2	2004 TU5	MBA-M	17.99	750 m	multiple	2004-2017	24 Dec 2017	23	Disc.: Spacewatch	MPC · JPL
0	2004 TB6	MBA-O	18.58	2.0 km	multiple	2004-2024	06 Jun 2024	43	Disc.: LPL/Spacewatch II; Alt.: 2015 FG482	MPC · JPL
–	2004 TE6	MBA-M	19.8	610 m	single	4 days	09 Oct 2004	9	Disc.: LPL/Spacewatch II	MPC · JPL
0	2004 TE8	APO	19.4	470 m	multiple	2004–2018	03 Jan 2018	53	Disc.: Spacewatch	MPC · JPL
9	2004 TA9	MCA	21.6	270 m	single	6 days	12 Oct 2004	21	Disc.: Spacewatch	MPC · JPL
6	2004 TG9	MBA-M	18.0	710 m	multiple	2004-2015	08 Jun 2015	20	Disc.: Spacewatch	MPC · JPL
0	2004 TQ9	HUN	19.13	440 m	multiple	2004–2021	15 Aug 2021	113	Disc.: LINEAR; Alt.: 2018 SW2	MPC · JPL}
0	2004 TB10	APO	21.4	190 m	multiple	2004–2019	02 Apr 2019	123	Disc.: LINEAR; Potentially hazardous object	MPC · JPL
0	2004 TD10	ATE	22.1	140 m	multiple	2004–2019	25 Sep 2019	166	Disc.: LINEAR	MPC · JPL
0	2004 TE10	APO	24.0	56 m	multiple	2004–2016	11 Jun 2016	105	Disc.: LINEAR; Alt.: 2016 LH11	MPC · JPL
1	2004 TF10	APO	20.94	230 m	multiple	2004–2021	25 Nov 2021	57	Disc.: LINEAR	MPC · JPL
7	2004 TJ10	APO	25.1	34 m	single	1 day	09 Oct 2004	32	Disc.: Spacewatch	MPC · JPL
1	2004 TL10	APO	21.3	200 m	multiple	2004–2017	16 Nov 2017	99	Disc.: LINEAR; Potentially hazardous object	MPC · JPL
0	2004 TG11	MCA	18.3	650 m	multiple	2004–2018	12 Dec 2018	101	Disc.: LINEAR; Alt.: 2016 ET156	MPC · JPL
2	2004 TP11	MCA	20.12	330 m	multiple	2004-2022	25 Nov 2022	63	Disc.: LINEAR	MPC · JPL
0	2004 TU11	AMO	21.1	210 m	multiple	2004–2013	20 Jan 2013	139	Disc.: LONEOS	MPC · JPL
7	2004 TV11	AMO	24.4	47 m	single	12 days	21 Oct 2004	29	Disc.: Spacewatch	MPC · JPL
6	2004 TW11	APO	24.0	56 m	single	31 days	09 Nov 2004	70	Disc.: LONEOS; AMO at MPC	MPC · JPL
0	2004 TK12	MCA	18.23	1.3 km	multiple	2004–2019	10 Jan 2019	171	Disc.: Spacewatch	MPC · JPL
0	2004 TQ12	MCA	18.7	540 m	multiple	2004–2020	17 Dec 2020	228	Disc.: LINEAR; Alt.: 2010 PA15, 2010 PT19	MPC · JPL
1	2004 TS12	MCA	17.6	1.7 km	multiple	2000–2020	23 Dec 2020	79	Disc.: LINEAR	MPC · JPL
6	2004 TT12	AMO	24.0	56 m	single	45 days	18 Nov 2004	24	Disc.: Spacewatch	MPC · JPL
9	2004 TP13	ATE	23.1	85 m	single	7 days	15 Oct 2004	23	Disc.: LINEAR	MPC · JPL
1	2004 TK14	AMO	20.1	340 m	multiple	2004–2006	30 Sep 2006	57	Disc.: LONEOS	MPC · JPL
1	2004 TA15	MBA-M	18.67	670 m	multiple	2004-2023	01 Feb 2023	31	Disc.: Spacewatch	MPC · JPL
2	2004 TD16	MCA	19.1	640 m	multiple	2004–2017	10 Oct 2017	33	Disc.: LINEAR; Alt.: 2017 QE81	MPC · JPL
0	2004 TK17	MCA	19.3	410 m	multiple	2004–2020	15 Sep 2020	43	Disc.: Spacewatch	MPC · JPL
7	2004 TC18	APO	24.0	56 m	single	8 days	20 Oct 2004	32	Disc.: LINEAR	MPC · JPL
7	2004 TD18	APO	22.2	130 m	single	35 days	11 Nov 2004	39	Disc.: Spacewatch	MPC · JPL
5	2004 TE18	AMO	21.2	200 m	single	37 days	20 Nov 2004	26	Disc.: LONEOS	MPC · JPL
1	2004 TF18	MCA	19.1	860 m	multiple	2004-2022	02 Dec 2022	61	Disc.: NEAT Alt.: 2022 QA7	MPC · JPL
8	2004 TN20	ATE	24.9	37 m	single	3 days	18 Oct 2004	17	Disc.: LINEAR	MPC · JPL
0	2004 TO20	APO	23.33	80 m	multiple	2004-2023	10 Jul 2023	57	Disc.: LINEAR; AMO at MPC	MPC · JPL
0	2004 TY21	MBA-O	17.85	1.5 km	multiple	2004–2021	11 Nov 2021	24	Disc.: Spacewatch	MPC · JPL
0	2004 TD22	MBA-M	18.09	1.0 km	multiple	2004–2021	08 Sep 2021	38	Disc.: Spacewatch	MPC · JPL
2	2004 TE22	MBA-I	18.5	590 m	multiple	2004–2018	09 Nov 2018	47	Disc.: Spacewatch	MPC · JPL
0	2004 TW22	MBA-O	17.1	2.1 km	multiple	2004–2020	11 Sep 2020	65	Disc.: Spacewatch; Alt.: 2015 TE313	MPC · JPL
1	2004 TX22	MBA-I	19.7	340 m	multiple	2004–2014	13 Oct 2014	18	Disc.: Spacewatch; Added on 24 December 2021	MPC · JPL
0	2004 TG24	MBA-M	18.5	840 m	multiple	2004–2017	29 Aug 2017	35	Disc.: Spacewatch	MPC · JPL
1	2004 TH24	MBA-M	18.2	1.3 km	multiple	2004–2013	22 Oct 2013	20	Disc.: Spacewatch	MPC · JPL
0	2004 TZ24	MBA-I	19.17	440 m	multiple	2004–2021	01 Nov 2021	123	Disc.: Spacewatch; Alt.: 2014 OT209	MPC · JPL
0	2004 TD25	MBA-M	18.54	820 m	multiple	2004–2021	27 Oct 2021	71	Disc.: Spacewatch; Added on 11 May 2021; Alt.: 2017 UC82	MPC · JPL
2	2004 TE25	MBA-I	18.5	590 m	multiple	2004–2019	28 Nov 2019	39	Disc.: Spacewatch; Alt.: 2015 RS182	MPC · JPL
3	2004 TA26	MBA-M	18.2	680 m	multiple	2004–2021	12 Dec 2021	44	Disc.: Spacewatch	MPC · JPL
–	2004 TD26	MBA-M	19.2	610 m	single	8 days	12 Oct 2004	9	Disc.: Spacewatch	MPC · JPL
2	2004 TQ26	MBA-M	17.8	820 m	multiple	2004–2020	29 Jun 2020	40	Disc.: Spacewatch; Alt.: 2008 SW37	MPC · JPL
0	2004 TW26	MBA-M	18.33	910 m	multiple	2004–2021	11 Sep 2021	57	Disc.: Spacewatch; Alt.: 2013 WR101, 2017 SX103	MPC · JPL
0	2004 TB27	MBA-I	19.0	470 m	multiple	2004–2018	14 Sep 2018	35	Disc.: Spacewatch; Alt.: 2011 UW3	MPC · JPL
0	2004 TR27	MBA-I	18.7	540 m	multiple	2004–2019	25 Sep 2019	36	Disc.: Spacewatch	MPC · JPL
3	2004 TN28	MBA-O	17.9	1.5 km	multiple	2004–2014	03 Aug 2014	28	Disc.: Spacewatch	MPC · JPL
0	2004 TV28	MBA-I	18.6	570 m	multiple	2004–2019	22 Oct 2019	32	Disc.: Spacewatch	MPC · JPL
0	2004 TD29	MBA-M	18.18	970 m	multiple	2004–2021	02 Oct 2021	60	Disc.: Spacewatch	MPC · JPL
0	2004 TJ29	MBA-I	19.2	430 m	multiple	2004–2019	24 Oct 2019	31	Disc.: Spacewatch	MPC · JPL
0	2004 TN29	MBA-I	18.56	580 m	multiple	2004–2021	19 Nov 2021	71	Disc.: Spacewatch; Alt.: 2014 OJ274	MPC · JPL
0	2004 TS29	MBA-I	19.16	410 m	multiple	2004-2022	25 Dec 2022	46	Disc.: Spacewatch	MPC · JPL
1	2004 TZ29	MBA-O	17.77	1.9 km	multiple	2004-2023	28 Mar 2023	38	Disc.: Spacewatch	MPC · JPL
2	2004 TC30	MBA-M	18.64	590 m	multiple	2004-2019	03 Mar 2019	24	Disc.: Spacewatch	MPC · JPL
0	2004 TE30	MBA-I	18.8	520 m	multiple	2004–2019	17 Dec 2019	29	Disc.: Spacewatch	MPC · JPL
–	2004 TD35	MBA-M	18.9	490 m	single	8 days	12 Oct 2004	9	Disc.: Spacewatch	MPC · JPL
0	2004 TU35	MBA-I	18.7	540 m	multiple	2004–2019	05 Nov 2019	53	Disc.: Spacewatch	MPC · JPL
1	2004 TH36	MBA-M	18.6	1.1 km	multiple	1995–2013	30 Oct 2013	39	Disc.: Spacewatch; Alt.: 2013 RB91	MPC · JPL
0	2004 TP36	MBA-I	19.1	450 m	multiple	2004–2020	14 May 2020	54	Disc.: Spacewatch; Added on 22 July 2020	MPC · JPL
0	2004 TZ36	MBA-M	18.1	710 m	multiple	2004–2019	03 Apr 2019	33	Disc.: Spacewatch	MPC · JPL
0	2004 TA38	MBA-M	17.6	1.3 km	multiple	2002–2017	25 Nov 2017	84	Disc.: Spacewatch; Alt.: 2017 SL115	MPC · JPL
0	2004 TH38	MBA-I	19.2	430 m	multiple	2004–2018	03 Oct 2018	20	Disc.: Spacewatch	MPC · JPL
1	2004 TZ38	MBA-M	19.07	650 m	multiple	2004–2021	27 Oct 2021	46	Disc.: Spacewatch	MPC · JPL
0	2004 TH39	MBA-I	18.7	540 m	multiple	2000–2019	22 Oct 2019	53	Disc.: Spacewatch	MPC · JPL
0	2004 TT39	MBA-I	19.7	340 m	multiple	2004–2017	17 Aug 2017	33	Disc.: LPL/Spacewatch II	MPC · JPL
1	2004 TZ40	MBA-I	18.9	490 m	multiple	2004–2015	23 Oct 2015	27	Disc.: LPL/Spacewatch II	MPC · JPL
0	2004 TY41	MBA-M	17.8	1.5 km	multiple	2004–2019	05 Feb 2019	31	Disc.: Spacewatch	MPC · JPL
3	2004 TU42	MBA-M	18.5	840 m	multiple	2004–2021	28 Nov 2021	35	Disc.: Spacewatch; Added on 24 December 2021	MPC · JPL
0	2004 TP43	MBA-I	18.7	540 m	multiple	2004–2015	08 Nov 2015	77	Disc.: Spacewatch	MPC · JPL
0	2004 TX52	MBA-O	16.93	2.3 km	multiple	2004–2022	05 Jan 2022	94	Disc.: Spacewatch	MPC · JPL
0	2004 TX56	MBA-M	18.5	840 m	multiple	2001–2019	03 Apr 2019	36	Disc.: Spacewatch	MPC · JPL
0	2004 TR57	MBA-O	17.08	2.1 km	multiple	2004–2021	25 Nov 2021	87	Disc.: Spacewatch; Alt.: 2010 WM3	MPC · JPL
2	2004 TM58	MBA-M	19.18	610 m	multiple	2004–2021	29 Nov 2021	46	Disc.: Spacewatch	MPC · JPL
1	2004 TG59	MBA-O	18.2	1.3 km	multiple	1999–2019	25 Oct 2019	41	Disc.: Spacewatch; Alt.: 2009 SB178	MPC · JPL
0	2004 TH59	MBA-I	18.97	480 m	multiple	2004–2021	07 Nov 2021	42	Disc.: Spacewatch	MPC · JPL
1	2004 TS62	MBA-O	17.85	1.5 km	multiple	2004–2021	08 Dec 2021	45	Disc.: Spacewatch	MPC · JPL
0	2004 TN63	MBA-I	18.6	570 m	multiple	2004–2015	23 Oct 2015	31	Disc.: Spacewatch	MPC · JPL
1	2004 TK64	MBA-I	19.7	340 m	multiple	2004–2014	28 Oct 2014	16	Disc.: Spacewatch; Alt.: 2014 UH128	MPC · JPL
0	2004 TT64	MBA-I	18.86	500 m	multiple	2004–2021	03 Oct 2021	62	Disc.: Spacewatch; Added on 21 August 2021	MPC · JPL
0	2004 TB65	MBA-O	17.3	1.9 km	multiple	2002–2021	30 Nov 2021	46	Disc.: LPL/Spacewatch II; Added on 24 December 2021	MPC · JPL
0	2004 TC65	MBA-I	18.5	590 m	multiple	2004–2020	04 Jan 2020	99	Disc.: Spacewatch; Alt.: 2004 TX363, 2015 TH221	MPC · JPL
0	2004 TN70	MBA-O	17.5	1.8 km	multiple	2004–2020	10 Dec 2020	48	Disc.: LPL/Spacewatch II; Alt.: 2014 QN194	MPC · JPL
0	2004 TV70	MBA-I	18.6	570 m	multiple	2004–2019	22 Oct 2019	34	Disc.: LPL/Spacewatch II; Added on 22 July 2020	MPC · JPL
0	2004 TD73	MBA-O	17.2	2.0 km	multiple	2004–2020	07 Dec 2020	58	Disc.: LPL/Spacewatch II	MPC · JPL
1	2004 TR74	MCA	19.57	360 m	multiple	2004–2021	30 Nov 2021	50	Disc.: LPL/Spacewatch II; Alt.: 2014 QW401	MPC · JPL
0	2004 TW76	MBA-O	17.18	2.0 km	multiple	2004–2021	04 Oct 2021	66	Disc.: LPL/Spacewatch II	MPC · JPL
0	2004 TY76	MBA-O	17.04	2.2 km	multiple	2004–2022	04 Jan 2022	108	Disc.: LPL/Spacewatch II; Alt.: 2015 TU197	MPC · JPL
0	2004 TR78	MBA-O	17.13	2.1 km	multiple	2004–2021	30 Oct 2021	87	Disc.: LPL/Spacewatch II; Alt.: 2015 PH182	MPC · JPL
0	2004 TS80	MBA-M	17.96	1.1 km	multiple	2004-2022	25 Nov 2022	39	Disc.: Spacewatch; Alt.: 2013 VH85	MPC · JPL
0	2004 TY80	MBA-I	18.7	540 m	multiple	2004–2019	02 Oct 2019	33	Disc.: Spacewatch	MPC · JPL
0	2004 TZ80	MBA-I	19.1	450 m	multiple	2004–2019	19 Dec 2019	52	Disc.: Spacewatch	MPC · JPL
3	2004 TK81	MBA-I	19.2	430 m	multiple	2004–2015	12 Sep 2015	19	Disc.: Spacewatch	MPC · JPL
0	2004 TV81	MBA-I	19.3	410 m	multiple	2004–2011	30 Aug 2011	15	Disc.: Spacewatch	MPC · JPL
0	2004 TY81	MBA-I	18.8	520 m	multiple	2004–2020	23 Jun 2020	26	Disc.: Spacewatch	MPC · JPL
0	2004 TZ81	MBA-O	17.6	1.7 km	multiple	2002–2020	16 Oct 2020	34	Disc.: Spacewatch; Added on 17 January 2021	MPC · JPL
2	2004 TB82	MBA-O	17.9	1.5 km	multiple	2004–2020	20 Oct 2020	35	Disc.: Spacewatch; Added on 17 January 2021; Alt.: 2020 PY13	MPC · JPL
2	2004 TL82	MBA-I	19.5	370 m	multiple	2004–2021	06 Nov 2021	42	Disc.: Spacewatch; Added on 29 January 2022	MPC · JPL
1	2004 TO82	MBA-O	17.5	1.8 km	multiple	2004–2019	25 Sep 2019	32	Disc.: Spacewatch	MPC · JPL
4	2004 TH83	MBA-I	19.4	390 m	multiple	2004–2018	11 Nov 2018	28	Disc.: Spacewatch; Alt.: 2011 SH168	MPC · JPL
2	2004 TW83	MBA-M	18.8	520 m	multiple	2004-2025	28 Oct 2025	31	Disc.: Spacewatch	MPC · JPL
3	2004 TY83	MBA-M	20.1	400 m	multiple	2004–2021	14 Nov 2021	38	Disc.: Spacewatch	MPC · JPL
4	2004 TZ83	MBA-I	19.4	390 m	multiple	2004–2018	06 Oct 2018	32	Disc.: Spacewatch; Alt.: 2011 SS137	MPC · JPL
2	2004 TM84	MBA-M	18.85	710 m	multiple	2004–2021	16 Jul 2021	24	Disc.: Spacewatch; Added on 22 July 2020	MPC · JPL
3	2004 TS84	MBA-M	18.0	750 m	multiple	2004–2019	08 Apr 2019	28	Disc.: Spacewatch	MPC · JPL
0	2004 TT84	MBA-I	18.8	520 m	multiple	2004–2015	04 Dec 2015	23	Disc.: Spacewatch	MPC · JPL
2	2004 TK85	MBA-M	18.24	1.2 km	multiple	2004-2023	08 Nov 2023	28	Disc.: Spacewatch	MPC · JPL
3	2004 TY85	MBA-I	19.1	450 m	multiple	2004–2019	21 Oct 2019	35	Disc.: Spacewatch	MPC · JPL
0	2004 TL86	MBA-I	18.5	590 m	multiple	2004–2018	05 Aug 2018	32	Disc.: Spacewatch	MPC · JPL
0	2004 TU86	MBA-I	18.8	520 m	multiple	2004–2018	14 Aug 2018	45	Disc.: Spacewatch	MPC · JPL
2	2004 TH89	MBA-M	18.40	880 m	multiple	2004–2021	09 Nov 2021	50	Disc.: Spacewatch; Added on 5 November 2021; Alt.: 2021 QL62	MPC · JPL
2	2004 TN89	MBA-M	19.2	430 m	multiple	2004–2020	12 Sep 2020	30	Disc.: Spacewatch	MPC · JPL
1	2004 TY89	MCA	19.63	360 m	multiple	2004-2022	29 Oct 2022	50	Disc.: Spacewatch	MPC · JPL
1	2004 TN90	MBA-M	18.7	1.0 km	multiple	2004–2018	13 Dec 2018	21	Disc.: Spacewatch; Added on 19 October 2020	MPC · JPL
2	2004 TP90	MBA-I	18.88	490 m	multiple	2004-2022	02 Dec 2022	55	Disc.: Spacewatch	MPC · JPL
2	2004 TW92	MBA-I	19.3	410 m	multiple	2004–2018	16 Sep 2018	34	Disc.: Spacewatch	MPC · JPL
3	2004 TW93	MBA-O	19.1	840 m	multiple	2004–2015	13 Oct 2015	20	Disc.: Spacewatch	MPC · JPL
0	2004 TG94	MBA-I	18.9	490 m	multiple	2004–2019	05 Oct 2019	42	Disc.: Spacewatch	MPC · JPL
2	2004 TR94	MBA-M	18.07	820 m	multiple	2004-2023	26 Mar 2023	20	Disc.: Spacewatch	MPC · JPL
4	2004 TB96	MBA-O	18.9	920 m	multiple	2004–2009	20 Aug 2009	15	Disc.: Spacewatch; Alt.: 2009 QF17	MPC · JPL
0	2004 TN96	MBA-O	18.21	1.5 km	multiple	2004-2023	15 Jan 2023	38	Disc.: Spacewatch	MPC · JPL
2	2004 TU98	MBA-M	18.0	1.1 km	multiple	2004–2017	25 Nov 2017	36	Disc.: Spacewatch; Alt.: 2017 SL162	MPC · JPL
3	2004 TR99	MBA-I	18.3	650 m	multiple	2004–2020	22 Apr 2020	36	Disc.: Spacewatch; Alt.: 2011 UR271	MPC · JPL

back to top
