= List of unnumbered minor planets: 2004 C =

This is a partial list of unnumbered minor planets for principal provisional designations assigned during 1–15 February 2004. As of May 2026, a total of 44 bodies remain unnumbered for this period. Objects for this year are listed on the following pages: A–B · C · D–E · F · G–H · J–O · P–Q · R_{i} · R_{ii} · R_{iii} · S · T_{i} · T_{ii} · T_{iii} · T_{iv} · U–V · W–X and Y. Also see previous and next year.

Near-Earth obj.	MBA (inner)	MBA (outer)	Centaur
Mars-crosser	MBA (middle)	Jupiter trojan	Trans-Neptunian obj.
Unclassified

== C ==
U	Designation	Class	Physical		Observations				Description and notes	Ref
U	Designation	Class	H	D	Opp.	Arc	Last	Used	Description and notes	Ref
7	2004 CC	APO	23.6	68 m	single	5 days	07 Feb 2004	21	Disc.: LINEAR	MPC · JPL
6	2004 CQ	AMO	24.7	41 m	single	16 days	26 Feb 2004	75	Disc.: CSS	MPC · JPL
2	2004 CS	AMO	20.2	320 m	multiple	2004–2008	20 Dec 2008	92	Disc.: LINEAR	MPC · JPL
7	2004 CZ1	APO	24.4	47 m	single	12 days	24 Feb 2004	110	Disc.: Spacewatch	MPC · JPL
8	2004 CA2	APO	23.7	65 m	single	10 days	22 Feb 2004	44	Disc.: NEAT	MPC · JPL
1	2004 CR2	AMO	19.1	540 m	multiple	2004–2012	25 Aug 2012	159	Disc.: LPL/Spacewatch II	MPC · JPL
1	2004 CY6	MBA-I	19.14	440 m	multiple	2004–2021	10 Sep 2021	27	Disc.: Spacewatch	MPC · JPL
0	2004 CE20	MBA-O	17.1	2.1 km	multiple	2004–2021	11 Feb 2021	34	Disc.: Spacewatch; Alt.: 2015 AK62	MPC · JPL
0	2004 CK20	MBA-I	18.9	490 m	multiple	2004–2020	05 Nov 2020	49	Disc.: Spacewatch; Alt.: 2011 BG31, 2013 TE121	MPC · JPL
0	2004 CC23	MBA-M	18.5	840 m	multiple	2004–2021	11 Mar 2021	37	Disc.: Spacewatch; Added on 9 March 2021	MPC · JPL
0	2004 CP31	MBA-M	18.1	1.0 km	multiple	1994–2017	21 Feb 2017	27	Disc.: Spacewatch	MPC · JPL
4	2004 CV32	MBA-O	17.8	1.5 km	multiple	2004–2008	30 Nov 2008	13	Disc.: LPL/Spacewatch II	MPC · JPL
2	2004 CN33	MBA-M	18.6	570 m	multiple	2004–2019	28 Nov 2019	40	Disc.: Spacewatch; Added on 22 July 2020	MPC · JPL
1	2004 CD39	AMO	20.4	300 m	multiple	2004–2008	11 May 2008	135	Disc.: NEAT	MPC · JPL
3	2004 CE39	APO	21.4	190 m	multiple	2004–2005	19 Jan 2005	135	Disc.: LONEOS	MPC · JPL
1	2004 CJ39	CEN	13.6	11 km	multiple	2004–2007	21 Apr 2007	17	Disc.: Spacewatch	MPC · JPL
0	2004 CZ43	MBA-M	17.7	1.6 km	multiple	2004–2013	16 Feb 2013	26	Disc.: Spacewatch; Alt.: 2013 CR14	MPC · JPL
0	2004 CC46	MBA-M	18.72	540 m	multiple	2004–2021	31 May 2021	33	Disc.: Spacewatch; Added on 17 June 2021	MPC · JPL
1	2004 CQ49	MCA	18.79	970 m	multiple	2004-2023	13 Jun 2023	54	Disc.: NEAT	MPC · JPL
0	2004 CR51	MCA	18.41	1.2 km	multiple	2004–2022	13 Jan 2022	125	Disc.: NEAT	MPC · JPL
1	2004 CA87	MBA-M	18.6	570 m	multiple	2004–2021	15 Apr 2021	30	Disc.: Spacewatch; Alt.: 2021 EF25	MPC · JPL
2	2004 CJ89	MBA-O	17.7	1.6 km	multiple	2004–2019	08 Apr 2019	29	Disc.: Spacewatch	MPC · JPL
2	2004 CW90	MBA-M	18.12	1.3 km	multiple	2004–2022	07 Jan 2022	18	Disc.: Spacewatch; Added on 21 August 2021	MPC · JPL
0	2004 CX106	MCA	17.07	2.1 km	multiple	2004–2022	14 Jan 2022	201	Disc.: NEAT	MPC · JPL
0	2004 CS110	MBA-M	17.91	1.2 km	multiple	2004-2025	21 Feb 2025	44	Disc.: Kitt Peak Obs.	MPC · JPL
–	2004 CM111	TNO	14.2	8.0 km	single	9 days	22 Feb 2004	41	Disc.: Spacewatch; LoUTNOs, centaur	MPC · JPL
0	2004 CY119	MBA-I	18.8	520 m	multiple	2004–2019	22 Sep 2019	40	Disc.: LPL/Spacewatch II	MPC · JPL
0	2004 CB120	MBA-I	19.0	470 m	multiple	2004–2021	09 Apr 2021	33	Disc.: LPL/Spacewatch II; Added on 17 June 2021; Alt.: 2009 SA54	MPC · JPL
0	2004 CD123	MBA-I	18.8	520 m	multiple	2004–2018	13 Apr 2018	89	Disc.: Spacewatch	MPC · JPL
3	2004 CJ125	MBA-M	18.2	1.3 km	multiple	2004–2013	14 Mar 2013	16	Disc.: Spacewatch; Added on 24 December 2021	MPC · JPL
1	2004 CB131	MBA-M	18.6	570 m	multiple	2004–2020	22 Jan 2020	35	Disc.: Spacewatch	MPC · JPL
0	2004 CL132	MBA-I	18.4	620 m	multiple	2004–2018	18 Mar 2018	40	Disc.: Spacewatch	MPC · JPL
0	2004 CN132	MBA-M	18.1	1.0 km	multiple	2004–2021	18 Jan 2021	38	Disc.: Spacewatch	MPC · JPL
0	2004 CL133	MBA-I	18.4	620 m	multiple	2004–2020	25 Sep 2020	36	Disc.: Spacewatch	MPC · JPL
0	2004 CP133	MBA-I	18.7	540 m	multiple	2004–2015	08 Jun 2015	23	Disc.: LPL/Spacewatch II	MPC · JPL
2	2004 CQ133	MBA-M	18.6	800 m	multiple	2004–2020	14 Dec 2020	31	Disc.: LPL/Spacewatch II	MPC · JPL
1	2004 CP134	MBA-M	18.9	490 m	multiple	2004–2019	28 Nov 2019	43	Disc.: Spacewatch	MPC · JPL
0	2004 CF135	MBA-I	18.8	520 m	multiple	2004–2019	28 May 2019	37	Disc.: Spacewatch	MPC · JPL
0	2004 CH135	MBA-M	17.93	1.4 km	multiple	2004–2022	07 Jan 2022	39	Disc.: Spacewatch	MPC · JPL
1	2004 CS135	MBA-I	18.9	490 m	multiple	2004–2018	18 Mar 2018	26	Disc.: Spacewatch	MPC · JPL
0	2004 CX135	MBA-M	18.2	680 m	multiple	2004–2020	24 Jan 2020	54	Disc.: Spacewatch	MPC · JPL
0	2004 CB136	MBA-I	18.9	490 m	multiple	2004–2017	26 Dec 2017	35	Disc.: Spacewatch	MPC · JPL
2	2004 CC136	MBA-M	18.4	620 m	multiple	2004–2020	23 Jan 2020	36	Disc.: LPL/Spacewatch II; Added on 22 July 2020	MPC · JPL
0	2004 CF136	MBA-I	18.6	570 m	multiple	2004–2019	24 Oct 2019	24	Disc.: LPL/Spacewatch II; Added on 17 January 2021	MPC · JPL

back to top
