= List of unnumbered minor planets: 2004 T (200–299) =

This is a partial list of unnumbered minor planets for principal provisional designations assigned during 1–15 October 2004. Since this period yielded a high number of provisional discoveries, it is further split into several standalone pages. As of March 2026, a total of 110 bodies remain unnumbered for this period. Objects for this year are listed on the following pages: A–B · C · D–E · F · G–H · J–O · P–Q · R_{i} · R_{ii} · R_{iii} · S · T_{i} · T_{ii} · T_{iii} · T_{iv} · U–V · W–X and Y. Also see previous and next year.

Near-Earth obj.	MBA (inner)	MBA (outer)	Centaur
Mars-crosser	MBA (middle)	Jupiter trojan	Trans-Neptunian obj.
Unclassified

== T ==
U	Designation	Class	Physical		Observations				Description and notes	Ref
U	Designation	Class	H	D	Opp.	Arc	Last	Used	Description and notes	Ref
1	2004 TF200	MBA-M	18.74	750 m	multiple	2004–2021	09 Sep 2021	43	Disc.: Spacewatch	MPC · JPL
1	2004 TD201	MBA-I	18.9	490 m	multiple	2004–2018	16 Sep 2018	32	Disc.: Spacewatch; Alt.: 2011 TB1	MPC · JPL
0	2004 TJ201	MBA-O	16.8	2.4 km	multiple	2004–2021	09 Jan 2021	103	Disc.: Spacewatch; Alt.: 2010 BM135	MPC · JPL
0	2004 TG202	MBA-O	17.12	2.1 km	multiple	2004–2021	29 Nov 2021	62	Disc.: Spacewatch	MPC · JPL
0	2004 TW207	MBA-M	18.06	1.2 km	multiple	2004-2024	06 Mar 2024	55	Disc.: LPL/Spacewatch II	MPC · JPL
0	2004 TT208	MBA-M	18.16	450 m	multiple	2004-2024	14 Feb 2024	59	Disc.: Spacewatch	MPC · JPL
0	2004 TY208	MBA-I	19.1	450 m	multiple	2004–2019	27 Oct 2019	49	Disc.: Spacewatch	MPC · JPL
0	2004 TA209	MBA-M	18.89	700 m	multiple	2004–2021	31 Oct 2021	42	Disc.: Spacewatch	MPC · JPL
1	2004 TD209	MBA-M	18.0	1.4 km	multiple	2004–2018	15 Oct 2018	29	Disc.: Spacewatch	MPC · JPL
1	2004 TB210	MBA-M	17.7	1.2 km	multiple	2004-2023	23 Aug 2023	30	Disc.: Spacewatch	MPC · JPL
0	2004 TM210	MBA-M	18.23	1.3 km	multiple	2004–2018	10 Nov 2018	36	Disc.: Spacewatch; Added on 21 August 2021	MPC · JPL
0	2004 TT210	MBA-M	18.67	550 m	multiple	2004–2022	25 Jan 2022	36	Disc.: Spacewatch; Added on 17 June 2021; Alt.: 2014 EU189	MPC · JPL
0	2004 TB211	MBA-O	17.3	1.9 km	multiple	2004–2020	20 Oct 2020	55	Disc.: Spacewatch	MPC · JPL
2	2004 TL211	MBA-I	18.8	520 m	multiple	2004–2019	17 Dec 2019	31	Disc.: Spacewatch; Alt.: 2015 VC16	MPC · JPL
E	2004 TS213	MBA-M	19.8	330 m	single	2 days	11 Oct 2004	15	Disc.: Spacewatch	MPC · JPL
–	2004 TQ214	MBA-M	19.3	770 m	single	2 days	11 Oct 2004	9	Disc.: LPL/Spacewatch II	MPC · JPL
1	2004 TR214	MBA-M	17.61	700 m	multiple	2004-2023	28 Mar 2023	28	Disc.: LPL/Spacewatch II	MPC · JPL
0	2004 TJ215	MBA-M	17.8	1.2 km	multiple	2004–2019	13 Jan 2019	41	Disc.: Spacewatch; Alt.: 2017 ON29	MPC · JPL
2	2004 TL215	MBA-I	19.54	390 m	multiple	2004-2024	30 Dec 2024	28	Disc.: Spacewatch; Alt.: 2024 WK82	MPC · JPL
0	2004 TH217	MBA-I	19.01	470 m	multiple	2004–2022	05 Jan 2022	79	Disc.: Spacewatch; Added on 5 November 2021	MPC · JPL
0	2004 TL217	MBA-M	18.20	680 m	multiple	2004–2022	06 Jan 2022	28	Disc.: Spacewatch; Added on 24 December 2021	MPC · JPL
0	2004 TX217	MBA-I	18.3	650 m	multiple	2004–2019	04 Dec 2019	48	Disc.: Spacewatch	MPC · JPL
2	2004 TY217	MBA-I	19.2	430 m	multiple	2004–2021	30 Jun 2021	34	Disc.: Spacewatch	MPC · JPL
0	2004 TJ218	MBA-O	17.3	1.9 km	multiple	2004–2020	20 Oct 2020	48	Disc.: Spacewatch; Added on 19 October 2020	MPC · JPL
0	2004 TM218	MBA-I	18.6	570 m	multiple	2004–2019	19 Nov 2019	56	Disc.: Spacewatch; Alt.: 2015 OD32	MPC · JPL
0	2004 TT219	MBA-I	18.6	570 m	multiple	2004–2019	19 Dec 2019	43	Disc.: Spacewatch	MPC · JPL
0	2004 TO223	MBA-M	18.33	910 m	multiple	2000–2021	03 Aug 2021	50	Disc.: Spacewatch; Added on 19 October 2020	MPC · JPL
1	2004 TD224	MBA-O	17.4	1.8 km	multiple	2004–2016	09 Oct 2016	31	Disc.: Spacewatch	MPC · JPL
–	2004 TG225	MBA-M	18.8	520 m	single	26 days	03 Nov 2004	13	Disc.: Spacewatch	MPC · JPL
0	2004 TO225	MBA-M	18.0	750 m	multiple	2000–2019	06 Apr 2019	28	Disc.: Spacewatch	MPC · JPL
0	2004 TC227	MBA-M	17.8	1.5 km	multiple	2004–2017	29 Jul 2017	20	Disc.: Spacewatch; Added on 22 July 2020	MPC · JPL
2	2004 TD227	MBA-O	17.1	2.1 km	multiple	2004–2021	24 Nov 2021	71	Disc.: Spacewatch; Added on 24 December 2021	MPC · JPL
1	2004 TW227	MBA-I	18.9	490 m	multiple	2004–2019	24 Nov 2019	45	Disc.: Spacewatch	MPC · JPL
1	2004 TX227	MBA-I	19.4	390 m	multiple	2004–2020	16 Sep 2020	55	Disc.: Spacewatch	MPC · JPL
2	2004 TH228	MBA-M	18.18	1.1 km	multiple	2004-2024	11 Jam 2024	26	Disc.: Spacewatch	MPC · JPL
0	2004 TA229	MBA-M	18.50	840 m	multiple	2004–2021	10 Aug 2021	33	Disc.: Spacewatch	MPC · JPL
3	2004 TB229	MBA-I	19.5	370 m	multiple	2004–2018	15 Sep 2018	37	Disc.: Spacewatch	MPC · JPL
2	2004 TD229	MBA-O	17.8	1.5 km	multiple	2004–2019	05 Aug 2019	48	Disc.: Spacewatch; Alt.: 2009 SG302, 2014 QG190	MPC · JPL
0	2004 TR229	HUN	19.27	420 m	multiple	2004–2020	11 Dec 2020	56	Disc.: Spacewatch	MPC · JPL
1	2004 TV229	MBA-O	18.51	1.4 km	multiple	2004-2024	01 Feb 2024	45	Disc.: Spacewatch	MPC · JPL
3	2004 TX229	MBA-M	19.1	450 m	multiple	2000–2008	04 Sep 2008	19	Disc.: Kitt Peak Obs. Alt.: 2000 WR178	MPC · JPL
2	2004 TY229	MBA-O	17.2	2.0 km	multiple	2004–2020	20 Oct 2020	49	Disc.: Spacewatch; Added on 19 October 2020	MPC · JPL
1	2004 TS230	MBA-M	18.31	1.3 km	multiple	2004-2022	20 Oct 2022	46	Disc.: LONEOS	MPC · JPL
0	2004 TU230	MBA-O	17.22	2.0 km	multiple	2004–2021	30 Nov 2021	76	Disc.: Spacewatch	MPC · JPL
0	2004 TV230	MBA-M	18.26	940 m	multiple	2004–2021	24 Nov 2021	35	Disc.: Spacewatch; Added on 24 December 2021	MPC · JPL
0	2004 TA231	MBA-I	18.5	590 m	multiple	2004–2018	13 Nov 2018	37	Disc.: Spacewatch; Added on 22 July 2020	MPC · JPL
0	2004 TE231	MBA-I	18.6	570 m	multiple	2004–2015	03 Dec 2015	34	Disc.: Spacewatch; Alt.: 2015 TY232	MPC · JPL
0	2004 TL231	MBA-M	18.2	1.3 km	multiple	1995–2013	27 Nov 2013	25	Disc.: Spacewatch; Added on 5 November 2021	MPC · JPL
1	2004 TT231	MBA-I	19.1	450 m	multiple	2004–2019	22 Oct 2019	29	Disc.: Spacewatch	MPC · JPL
0	2004 TV234	MBA-M	17.85	1.1 km	multiple	2004–2021	11 Sep 2021	61	Disc.: Spacewatch	MPC · JPL
0	2004 TZ234	MBA-I	18.7	540 m	multiple	2004–2019	03 Oct 2019	45	Disc.: Spacewatch; Alt.: 2015 PN80	MPC · JPL
0	2004 TC235	MBA-M	17.8	1.5 km	multiple	2004–2020	23 Jan 2020	37	Disc.: Spacewatch	MPC · JPL
0	2004 TR236	MBA-O	17.09	2.1 km	multiple	2004–2021	24 Nov 2021	42	Disc.: Spacewatch; Added on 5 November 2021	MPC · JPL
0	2004 TO237	MBA-M	18.59	800 m	multiple	2004–2022	07 Jan 2022	39	Disc.: Spacewatch; Added on 24 December 2021	MPC · JPL
1	2004 TJ238	MBA-M	17.82	780 m	multiple	2004-2023	12 Apr 2023	39	Disc.: Spacewatch	MPC · JPL
0	2004 TD242	MBA-I	18.36	630 m	multiple	2004–2021	21 Dec 2021	89	Disc.: Spacewatch; Alt.: 2021 RC101	MPC · JPL
0	2004 TX243	MBA-M	18.05	1.0 km	multiple	2004–2021	01 Nov 2021	62	Disc.: Spacewatch; Alt.: 2017 WH10	MPC · JPL
0	2004 TS246	MBA-M	18.19	680 m	multiple	2004–2021	11 Nov 2021	31	Disc.: Spacewatch; Added on 13 September 2020	MPC · JPL
0	2004 TV246	MBA-M	18.31	920 m	multiple	2000–2021	03 Dec 2021	43	Disc.: Spacewatch; Added on 24 December 2021	MPC · JPL
1	2004 TE248	MBA-I	19.87	320 m	multiple	2004–2022	25 Jan 2022	33	Disc.: Spacewatch; Alt.: 2014 TX80, 2014 UN181	MPC · JPL
0	2004 TK248	MBA-M	18.43	870 m	multiple	2004–2021	04 Aug 2021	34	Disc.: Spacewatch	MPC · JPL
1	2004 TD250	MBA-I	19.4	390 m	multiple	2004–2018	12 Nov 2018	28	Disc.: LPL/Spacewatch II; Added on 17 June 2021	MPC · JPL
4	2004 TU251	MBA-I	18.8	520 m	multiple	2004–2018	05 Oct 2018	25	Disc.: Spacewatch; Added on 19 October 2020	MPC · JPL
0	2004 TV251	MBA-M	18.02	1.0 km	multiple	2004–2021	24 Nov 2021	82	Disc.: Spacewatch	MPC · JPL
0	2004 TB252	MBA-I	18.1	710 m	multiple	1999–2019	28 Nov 2019	52	Disc.: Spacewatch	MPC · JPL
0	2004 TE252	MBA-I	19.0	470 m	multiple	2004–2015	12 Nov 2015	18	Disc.: Spacewatch; Added on 19 October 2020	MPC · JPL
0	2004 TS252	MBA-M	18.09	1.0 km	multiple	2004–2021	23 Nov 2021	44	Disc.: Spacewatch; Added on 5 November 2021; Alt.: 2021 ST27	MPC · JPL
0	2004 TW252	MBA-I	18.72	540 m	multiple	2004–2022	25 Jan 2022	52	Disc.: Spacewatch; Alt.: 2014 WC121	MPC · JPL
2	2004 TY252	MBA-I	19.2	430 m	multiple	2004–2021	05 Feb 2021	23	Disc.: Spacewatch; Added on 21 August 2021; Alt.: 2008 UB296	MPC · JPL
0	2004 TE253	MCA	19.6	360 m	multiple	2004–2021	04 Oct 2021	45	Disc.: Spacewatch; Added on 5 November 2021; Alt.: 2021 PL44	MPC · JPL
0	2004 TO254	MBA-I	19.0	470 m	multiple	2004–2019	28 Dec 2019	25	Disc.: Spacewatch	MPC · JPL
0	2004 TY255	MBA-I	18.5	620 m	multiple	2004-2025	30 Oct 2025	75	Disc.: LONEOS	MPC · JPL
0	2004 TD256	MBA-I	17.8	820 m	multiple	2004–2017	20 Jan 2017	32	Disc.: Spacewatch	MPC · JPL
0	2004 TE256	MBA-O	17.67	1.6 km	multiple	2004–2021	30 Nov 2021	69	Disc.: Spacewatch; Added on 5 November 2021	MPC · JPL
0	2004 TJ256	MBA-M	17.6	1.7 km	multiple	2004–2018	17 Nov 2018	27	Disc.: Spacewatch	MPC · JPL
1	2004 TV257	MBA-I	19.71	340 m	multiple	2004–2021	13 Jul 2021	30	Disc.: Spacewatch; Added on 19 October 2020	MPC · JPL
1	2004 TV258	MBA-O	18.0	1.4 km	multiple	2004–2020	11 Oct 2020	40	Disc.: Spacewatch	MPC · JPL
1	2004 TH260	MBA-O	17.4	1.8 km	multiple	2004–2020	15 Sep 2020	71	Disc.: Spacewatch; Added on 22 July 2020	MPC · JPL
0	2004 TL260	MBA-O	17.3	1.9 km	multiple	2004–2021	30 Oct 2021	36	Disc.: Spacewatch; Added on 29 January 2022	MPC · JPL
2	2004 TE261	MBA-M	18.1	1.0 km	multiple	2004–2017	23 Sep 2017	27	Disc.: Spacewatch; Added on 17 June 2021; Alt.: 2013 WH12	MPC · JPL
0	2004 TS261	MBA-O	17.12	2.1 km	multiple	2004–2021	29 Nov 2021	47	Disc.: Spacewatch	MPC · JPL
2	2004 TB262	MBA-M	18.42	870 m	multiple	2004–2021	09 Aug 2021	28	Disc.: Spacewatch	MPC · JPL
0	2004 TV262	MBA-I	18.7	540 m	multiple	2004–2015	19 Nov 2015	28	Disc.: Spacewatch; Added on 19 October 2020	MPC · JPL
0	2004 TJ263	MBA-M	18.49	600 m	multiple	2004–2022	26 Jan 2022	44	Disc.: Spacewatch	MPC · JPL
1	2004 TY265	MBA-M	18.09	1.3 km	multiple	2004-2025	02 Nov 2025	36	Disc.: Spacewatch	MPC · JPL
4	2004 TX267	MBA-I	19.4	390 m	multiple	2004–2018	06 Oct 2018	25	Disc.: Spacewatch	MPC · JPL
0	2004 TU268	MBA-M	17.68	1.2 km	multiple	2004–2021	09 Sep 2021	44	Disc.: Spacewatch	MPC · JPL
2	2004 TL271	MBA-M	18.62	790 m	multiple	2004–2021	20 Nov 2021	49	Disc.: Spacewatch; Added on 5 November 2021	MPC · JPL
4	2004 TP271	MBA-M	18.6	800 m	multiple	2004–2021	30 Nov 2021	34	Disc.: Spacewatch; Added on 29 January 2022	MPC · JPL
0	2004 TW279	MBA-I	19.10	450 m	multiple	2003–2019	03 Oct 2019	43	Disc.: Spacewatch; Alt.: 2015 PD93	MPC · JPL
0	2004 TQ281	MBA-I	18.9	490 m	multiple	2004–2015	04 Dec 2015	27	Disc.: Spacewatch; Alt.: 2015 VD36	MPC · JPL
4	2004 TE282	TNO	8.3	122 km	multiple	2004–2024	26 Sep 2024	24	Disc.: Kitt Peak Obs. LoUTNOs, centaur	MPC · JPL
0	2004 TA284	MBA-I	18.4	620 m	multiple	2004–2019	03 Dec 2019	40	Disc.: Spacewatch	MPC · JPL
4	2004 TK285	MBA-I	19.1	450 m	multiple	2004–2019	26 Nov 2019	24	Disc.: Spacewatch; Added on 30 September 2021	MPC · JPL
0	2004 TO285	MBA-O	17.48	1.8 km	multiple	2004–2021	23 Nov 2021	44	Disc.: Spacewatch; Added on 5 November 2021	MPC · JPL
0	2004 TQ285	MBA-M	18.04	1.8 km	multiple	2004-2024	13 Feb 2024	37	Disc.: LINEAR	MPC · JPL
0	2004 TJ288	MBA-M	17.7	1.2 km	multiple	2004–2017	07 Nov 2017	36	Disc.: Spacewatch	MPC · JPL
0	2004 TA289	MBA-M	18.29	920 m	multiple	2004–2019	05 Feb 2019	40	Disc.: Spacewatch	MPC · JPL
0	2004 TQ289	MBA-M	17.7	1.6 km	multiple	2002–2019	03 Jan 2019	61	Disc.: Spacewatch	MPC · JPL
2	2004 TP290	MBA-I	19.4	390 m	multiple	2004–2018	08 Aug 2018	24	Disc.: Spacewatch	MPC · JPL
0	2004 TT290	MBA-I	18.2	680 m	multiple	2004–2019	19 Dec 2019	52	Disc.: Spacewatch; Alt.: 2015 VL19	MPC · JPL
1	2004 TV290	MBA-O	17.5	1.8 km	multiple	2004–2019	22 Oct 2019	58	Disc.: Spacewatch	MPC · JPL
0	2004 TY290	MBA-I	18.85	500 m	multiple	2004–2021	02 Oct 2021	38	Disc.: Spacewatch; Added on 30 September 2021	MPC · JPL
0	2004 TM291	MBA-M	18.7	760 m	multiple	2004–2021	11 Nov 2021	37	Disc.: Spacewatch; Added on 29 January 2022	MPC · JPL
0	2004 TT291	MBA-I	18.93	490 m	multiple	2004–2021	02 Dec 2021	36	Disc.: Spacewatch; Alt.: 2014 SW114	MPC · JPL
1	2004 TW291	MBA-I	19.0	470 m	multiple	2004–2019	04 Dec 2019	30	Disc.: Spacewatch	MPC · JPL
0	2004 TH292	MBA-I	19.2	430 m	multiple	2004–2019	01 Nov 2019	52	Disc.: Spacewatch	MPC · JPL
0	2004 TJ293	MBA-O	16.84	2.4 km	multiple	2004–2021	09 Nov 2021	84	Disc.: Spacewatch; Alt.: 2010 XS52	MPC · JPL
0	2004 TM298	MBA-I	18.4	620 m	multiple	2004–2019	28 Dec 2019	62	Disc.: Spacewatch	MPC · JPL
0	2004 TV298	MBA-O	17.5	1.8 km	multiple	1999–2020	11 Nov 2020	38	Disc.: Spacewatch	MPC · JPL
1	2004 TS299	MBA-O	17.5	1.8 km	multiple	2004–2019	23 Oct 2019	45	Disc.: Spacewatch; Alt.: 2014 QF406	MPC · JPL

back to top
