= List of unnumbered minor planets: 2004 R (200–299) =

This is a partial list of unnumbered minor planets for principal provisional designations assigned during 1–15 September 2004. Since this period yielded a high number of provisional discoveries, it is further split into several standalone pages. As of April 2026, a total of 122 bodies remain unnumbered for this period. Objects for this year are listed on the following pages: A–B · C · D–E · F · G–H · J–O · P–Q · R_{i} · R_{ii} · R_{iii} · S · T_{i} · T_{ii} · T_{iii} · T_{iv} · U–V · W–X and Y. Also see previous and next year.

Near-Earth obj.	MBA (inner)	MBA (outer)	Centaur
Mars-crosser	MBA (middle)	Jupiter trojan	Trans-Neptunian obj.
Unclassified

== R ==
U	Designation	Class	Physical		Observations				Description and notes	Ref
U	Designation	Class	H	D	Opp.	Arc	Last	Used	Description and notes	Ref
1	2004 RZ201	MBA-M	18.1	1.0 km	multiple	2004–2017	07 Nov 2017	59	Disc.: Spacewatch; Alt.: 2017 OG71	MPC; JPL
0	2004 RH202	MBA-M	17.1	2.1 km	multiple	2002–2018	14 Sep 2018	94	Disc.: Spacewatch; Alt.: 2016 CV8	MPC; JPL
0	2004 RU202	MBA-O	17.22	2.0 km	multiple	2004–2021	03 Oct 2021	54	Disc.: Spacewatch; Alt.: 2021 PD55	MPC; JPL
0	2004 RB203	MBA-I	18.92	710 m	multiple	2004-2025	26 May 2025	29	Disc.: Spacewatch	MPC; JPL
0	2004 RF203	MBA-I	19.2	430 m	multiple	2004–2020	15 Sep 2020	56	Disc.: LPL/Spacewatch II	MPC; JPL
1	2004 RN209	MBA-M	17.3	1.0 km	multiple	2004–2020	15 Jun 2020	42	Alt.: 2008 OH13	MPC; JPL
0	2004 RW210	MBA-M	17.73	1.2 km	multiple	2004–2021	07 Jul 2021	46	—	MPC; JPL
0	2004 RC213	MBA-M	17.99	1.1 km	multiple	2004–2021	28 Nov 2021	126	—	MPC; JPL
0	2004 RC222	MBA-M	17.58	1.3 km	multiple	2004–2021	31 Oct 2021	68	Alt.: 2017 YM3	MPC; JPL
2	2004 RQ228	MBA-I	18.4	620 m	multiple	2004–2016	22 Dec 2016	57	—	MPC; JPL
1	2004 RD229	MBA-I	18.8	520 m	multiple	2004–2018	13 Dec 2018	62	—	MPC; JPL
0	2004 RG229	MBA-M	17.79	1.2 km	multiple	2004–2021	11 Aug 2021	58	—	MPC; JPL
1	2004 RQ234	MBA-I	18.7	540 m	multiple	2004–2020	25 May 2020	52	Alt.: 2014 TQ4	MPC; JPL
0	2004 RT234	MBA-I	18.4	620 m	multiple	2004–2015	19 Jun 2015	46	Alt.: 2008 TD128	MPC; JPL
1	2004 RG237	MBA-I	19.3	410 m	multiple	1997–2015	01 Dec 2015	22	—	MPC; JPL
–	2004 RH237	MBA-M	19.4	390 m	single	6 days	16 Sep 2004	9	—	MPC; JPL
0	2004 RN237	MBA-I	18.5	590 m	multiple	2004–2019	20 Oct 2019	28	—	MPC; JPL
2	2004 RE238	MBA-M	18.4	1.2 km	multiple	2004–2013	25 Sep 2013	18	—	MPC; JPL
0	2004 RP238	MBA-O	17.44	1.8 km	multiple	2004–2021	28 Nov 2021	52	—	MPC; JPL
0	2004 RE239	MBA-O	17.5	1.8 km	multiple	2004–2020	15 Oct 2020	27	Disc.: Spacewatch; Added on 11 May 2021; Alt.: 2020 RN71	MPC; JPL
0	2004 RK240	MBA-M	17.99	1.1 km	multiple	2004–2021	08 Sep 2021	40	—	MPC; JPL
0	2004 RQ240	MBA-I	19.0	470 m	multiple	2003–2019	26 Sep 2019	39	Alt.: 2015 OZ26	MPC; JPL
0	2004 RT240	MBA-I	19.05	520 m	multiple	2004-2025	27 May 2025	41	—	MPC; JPL
1	2004 RZ240	MBA-M	18.34	620 m	multiple	2000-2024	04 Oct 2024	63	—	MPC; JPL
0	2004 RC241	MBA-O	17.40	1.8 km	multiple	2004–2021	06 Nov 2021	59	Alt.: 2010 OU82	MPC; JPL
0	2004 RK241	MBA-M	18.40	620 m	multiple	2004–2022	27 Jan 2022	44	—	MPC; JPL
0	2004 RP241	MBA-I	19.5	370 m	multiple	2000–2019	26 Sep 2019	131	—	MPC; JPL
0	2004 RD242	MBA-I	18.8	520 m	multiple	2004–2020	08 Jul 2020	41	—	MPC; JPL
–	2004 RW242	MCA	19.7	340 m	single	12 days	22 Sep 2004	12	—	MPC; JPL
–	2004 RG243	MBA-I	19.3	410 m	single	6 days	16 Sep 2004	9	—	MPC; JPL
1	2004 RK243	MBA-O	18.45	1.8 km	multiple	2004-2026	19 Oct 2026	26	—	MPC; JPL
0	2004 RQ243	MBA-O	18.10	1.3 km	multiple	2004–2020	21 Oct 2020	143	Disc.: Spacewatch; Added on 17 January 2021	MPC; JPL
2	2004 RW243	MBA-O	17.8	1.5 km	multiple	2004–2020	11 Oct 2020	50	—	MPC; JPL
2	2004 RD244	MBA-M	18.3	920 m	multiple	2004–2021	10 Aug 2021	39	—	MPC; JPL
0	2004 RM244	MBA-M	19.0	670 m	multiple	2004–2021	26 Nov 2021	34	—	MPC; JPL
1	2004 RO244	MBA-O	17.59	1.7 km	multiple	2004–2020	19 Oct 2020	80	Disc.: Spacewatch; Added on 17 January 2021	MPC; JPL
0	2004 RH247	MBA-O	17.14	2.1 km	multiple	2004–2021	03 Dec 2021	53	—	MPC; JPL
0	2004 RP249	MBA-I	19.0	470 m	multiple	2004–2020	25 Jan 2020	35	—	MPC; JPL
4	2004 RL251	AMO	22.7	100 m	single	51 days	04 Nov 2004	159	Disc.: LINEAR	MPC; JPL
6	2004 RN251	APO	26.1	21 m	single	2 days	17 Sep 2004	27	Disc.: LINEAR	MPC; JPL
2	2004 RU251	HUN	19.5	370 m	multiple	2004–2020	16 Oct 2020	56	—	MPC; JPL
0	2004 RW251	MBA-O	17.34	1.9 km	multiple	2004–2021	05 Nov 2021	95	Disc.: Table Mountain Obs. Added on 21 August 2021; Alt.: 2010 OU89	MPC; JPL
8	2004 RC252	AMO	21.3	200 m	single	6 days	21 Sep 2004	37	Disc.: Spacewatch	MPC; JPL
1	2004 RQ252	APO	22.4	120 m	multiple	2004–2012	04 May 2012	97	Disc.: SSS	MPC; JPL
0	2004 RH253	MBA-M	17.6	1.7 km	multiple	2004–2017	15 Jul 2017	61	Alt.: 2013 SX76	MPC; JPL
3	2004 RP258	MBA-I	19.62	340 m	multiple	2004-2022	22 Aug 2022	16	—	MPC; JPL
0	2004 RT258	MBA-I	18.0	750 m	multiple	2004–2021	05 Feb 2021	34	Disc.: Spacewatch; Added on 29 January 2022	MPC; JPL
0	2004 RB259	MBA-I	19.5	370 m	multiple	2004–2020	21 Oct 2020	41	—	MPC; JPL
0	2004 RY259	MBA-M	18.61	800 m	multiple	2004–2021	26 Oct 2021	84	— Added on 22 July 2020; Alt.: 2017 UT52	MPC; JPL
0	2004 RC260	MBA-M	18.55	820 m	multiple	2004–2021	06 Nov 2021	36	Disc.: Spacewatch; Added on 5 November 2021	MPC; JPL
0	2004 RD260	MBA-M	18.87	700 m	multiple	2004-2021	09 Oct 2021	28	—	MPC; JPL
0	2004 RK260	MBA-I	19.4	390 m	multiple	2004–2017	01 Sep 2017	26	Disc.: Spacewatch; Added on 19 October 2020	MPC; JPL
–	2004 RQ261	MBA-O	18.9	920 m	single	6 days	16 Sep 2004	9	—	MPC; JPL
0	2004 RZ261	MBA-M	18.0	1.1 km	multiple	2004–2019	28 Jan 2019	28	— Added on 22 July 2020	MPC; JPL
0	2004 RM262	MBA-I	18.95	430 m	multiple	2004-2022	27 Sep 2022	54	—	MPC; JPL
1	2004 RN262	MBA-M	19.04	460 m	multiple	2004–2020	13 Sep 2020	42	Alt.: 2016 PC179	MPC; JPL
2	2004 RT262	MBA-M	18.6	1.1 km	multiple	2004–2013	03 Aug 2013	18	—	MPC; JPL
0	2004 RY262	MBA-I	19.3	410 m	multiple	2004–2019	29 Sep 2019	32	— Added on 22 July 2020; Alt.: 2015 PW110	MPC; JPL
0	2004 RF263	MBA-M	18.15	990 m	multiple	2004–2021	30 May 2021	44	Disc.: Spacewatch; Added on 17 June 2021; Alt.: 2021 GX22	MPC; JPL
0	2004 RV263	MBA-I	18.8	520 m	multiple	2004–2015	07 Nov 2015	16	—	MPC; JPL
0	2004 RY263	MBA-M	18.58	700 m	multiple	2004-2022	24 Dec 2022	42	—	MPC; JPL
1	2004 RA264	MBA-I	18.9	490 m	multiple	2004–2019	24 Oct 2019	21	— Added on 22 July 2020	MPC; JPL
1	2004 RU265	MBA-M	18.0	750 m	multiple	2004–2020	15 Sep 2020	38	—	MPC; JPL
0	2004 RG266	MBA-M	17.9	1.1 km	multiple	2004–2017	11 Oct 2017	25	—	MPC; JPL
2	2004 RM266	MBA-I	20.2	270 m	multiple	2004–2014	02 Oct 2014	19	—	MPC; JPL
0	2004 RP266	MBA-I	18.6	570 m	multiple	2004–2019	28 Nov 2019	50	—	MPC; JPL
1	2004 RW266	MBA-O	17.9	1.5 km	multiple	2004–2019	28 Nov 2019	35	— Added on 22 July 2020	MPC; JPL
0	2004 RU267	MBA-O	17.17	2.0 km	multiple	2004–2021	27 Nov 2021	71	—	MPC; JPL
0	2004 RX267	MBA-M	18.32	910 m	multiple	2004–2021	27 Sep 2021	78	—	MPC; JPL
0	2004 RH268	MBA-M	18.01	1.1 km	multiple	2004–2021	03 Sep 2021	48	— Added on 22 July 2020	MPC; JPL
0	2004 RL268	MBA-M	18.15	760 m	multiple	2004-2025	24 Feb 2025	51	—	MPC; JPL
0	2004 RC270	MBA-O	18.5	1.1 km	multiple	2004–2020	21 Sep 2020	48	Disc.: Spacewatch; Added on 19 October 2020	MPC; JPL
2	2004 RJ270	MBA-I	19.1	450 m	multiple	2004–2018	22 Aug 2018	41	—	MPC; JPL
1	2004 RO270	MBA-O	17.6	1.7 km	multiple	2004–2021	11 Nov 2021	25	Disc.: Spacewatch; Added on 29 January 2022	MPC; JPL
0	2004 RX270	MBA-M	17.95	1.1 km	multiple	2004–2021	28 Sep 2021	54	—	MPC; JPL
1	2004 RZ270	MBA-I	19.3	410 m	multiple	2004–2015	18 Nov 2015	17	Disc.: Spacewatch; Added on 30 September 2021	MPC; JPL
2	2004 RF271	MBA-M	18.6	1.1 km	multiple	2004–2018	15 Oct 2018	24	Disc.: Spacewatch; Added on 19 October 2020	MPC; JPL
0	2004 RR271	MBA-I	19.0	470 m	multiple	2004–2015	02 Nov 2015	26	Alt.: 2015 VY14	MPC; JPL
0	2004 RV271	MBA-O	18.1	1.3 km	multiple	2004–2020	10 Dec 2020	28	Disc.: Spacewatch; Added on 9 March 2021	MPC; JPL
0	2004 RH272	MBA-I	18.5	590 m	multiple	2004–2020	16 Mar 2020	34	—	MPC; JPL
0	2004 RJ272	MBA-O	17.6	1.7 km	multiple	2004–2019	23 Sep 2019	169	—	MPC; JPL
1	2004 RM272	MBA-O	17.9	1.5 km	multiple	2004–2020	10 Nov 2020	30	Disc.: Spacewatch; Added on 17 January 2021	MPC; JPL
0	2004 RC273	MBA-M	18.43	610 m	multiple	2004–2021	25 Nov 2021	36	Disc.: Spacewatch; Added on 29 January 2022	MPC; JPL
0	2004 RN273	MBA-I	18.6	570 m	multiple	2004–2019	08 Jun 2019	34	—	MPC; JPL
2	2004 RN274	MBA-O	18.5	1.1 km	multiple	2004–2020	17 Oct 2020	30	Disc.: Spacewatch; Added on 17 January 2021	MPC; JPL
2	2004 RS274	MBA-I	18.9	490 m	multiple	2004–2019	02 Nov 2019	37	—	MPC; JPL
0	2004 RU274	MBA-I	19.39	390 m	multiple	2004–2021	31 Oct 2021	41	Disc.: LPL/Spacewatch II; Added on 5 November 2021	MPC; JPL
2	2004 RK275	MBA-I	18.4	620 m	multiple	2004–2020	10 Dec 2020	37	— Added on 24 August 2020	MPC; JPL
0	2004 RU277	MBA-I	18.9	490 m	multiple	2004–2019	03 Dec 2019	32	Disc.: Spacewatch; Added on 30 September 2021; Alt.: 2008 WZ122	MPC; JPL
0	2004 RO279	MBA-O	17.24	2.0 km	multiple	2004–2021	31 Oct 2021	49	Alt.: 2015 RB198	MPC; JPL
0	2004 RG280	MBA-I	18.7	540 m	multiple	2000–2019	29 Oct 2019	47	—	MPC; JPL
1	2004 RH280	MBA-O	17.7	1.6 km	multiple	2004–2020	11 Sep 2020	37	—	MPC; JPL
0	2004 RN281	MBA-I	19.1	450 m	multiple	1997–2018	30 Oct 2018	47	Alt.: 2009 BC60, 2011 SV235	MPC; JPL
0	2004 RY281	MBA-O	17.62	1.7 km	multiple	2004–2021	07 Nov 2021	38	—	MPC; JPL
0	2004 RE282	MBA-I	19.57	360 m	multiple	2004–2021	02 Oct 2021	51	Alt.: 2007 HX114	MPC; JPL
0	2004 RH282	MBA-M	18.41	870 m	multiple	2004–2021	30 Aug 2021	32	—	MPC; JPL
1	2004 RX282	MBA-I	19.17	440 m	multiple	2004–2018	05 Oct 2018	37	Disc.: Spacewatch; Added on 21 August 2021	MPC; JPL
1	2004 RB283	MBA-O	18.4	1.2 km	multiple	2004–2019	26 Sep 2019	39	Alt.: 2009 SP309	MPC; JPL
4	2004 RG283	MBA-I	20.0	300 m	multiple	2004–2020	23 Sep 2020	26	Disc.: Spacewatch; Added on 17 June 2021; Alt.: 2020 QO56	MPC; JPL
0	2004 RH283	MBA-I	19.57	360 m	multiple	2004–2021	08 Aug 2021	42	—	MPC; JPL
0	2004 RS283	MBA-M	18.67	780 m	multiple	2004–2021	26 Oct 2021	58	Disc.: Spacewatch; Added on 30 September 2021	MPC; JPL
0	2004 RQ284	MBA-M	18.53	830 m	multiple	2004–2021	01 Jul 2021	23	—	MPC; JPL
1	2004 RU288	MBA-I	18.8	520 m	multiple	2004–2018	11 Aug 2018	37	—	MPC; JPL
0	2004 RW288	MBA-M	17.95	1.1 km	multiple	2004–2021	27 Sep 2021	44	Disc.: Saint-Sulpice; Added on 19 October 2020	MPC; JPL
–	2004 RF294	MCA	20.6	320 m	single	10 days	21 Sep 2004	12	—	MPC; JPL
4	2004 RL294	MBA-O	17.9	1.5 km	multiple	2004–2020	23 Sep 2020	26	Disc.: Spacewatch; Added on 17 January 2021	MPC; JPL
0	2004 RO294	MBA-I	18.3	650 m	multiple	2000–2020	23 Nov 2020	37	—	MPC; JPL
0	2004 RZ294	MBA-O	17.75	1.6 km	multiple	2004–2021	28 Nov 2021	60	Disc.: Spacewatch; Added on 5 November 2021	MPC; JPL
0	2004 RB295	MBA-M	18.44	610 m	multiple	2004–2022	07 Jan 2022	30	Disc.: Spacewatch; Added on 5 November 2021	MPC; JPL
0	2004 RG295	MBA-I	19.74	340 m	multiple	2004–2021	07 Oct 2021	32	Disc.: Spacewatch; Added on 5 November 2021	MPC; JPL
0	2004 RT295	MBA-M	18.6	1.1 km	multiple	2004–2013	08 Oct 2013	20	—	MPC; JPL
0	2004 RA296	MBA-I	19.1	450 m	multiple	2004–2015	07 Nov 2015	20	—	MPC; JPL
0	2004 RC296	MBA-I	19.2	430 m	multiple	2004–2015	13 Nov 2015	17	Disc.: Spacewatch; Added on 19 October 2020	MPC; JPL
0	2004 RO296	MBA-I	18.9	490 m	multiple	2004–2019	20 Dec 2019	44	—	MPC; JPL
1	2004 RS296	MBA-I	19.2	390 m	multiple	2004-2025	20 Oct 2025	58	—	MPC; JPL
0	2004 RQ297	MBA-M	18.1	1.0 km	multiple	2004–2017	17 Aug 2017	33	—	MPC; JPL
0	2004 RK298	MBA-O	17.69	1.6 km	multiple	2004–2021	07 Nov 2021	41	Disc.: Spacewatch; Added on 19 October 2020	MPC; JPL
2	2004 RP298	MBA-I	18.9	490 m	multiple	2004–2018	12 Nov 2018	40	—	MPC; JPL
2	2004 RJ299	MBA-O	18.02	1.4 km	multiple	2004–2021	28 Nov 2021	24	—	MPC; JPL
0	2004 RZ299	MBA-O	17.2	2.0 km	multiple	2004–2021	03 Oct 2021	32	Disc.: Spacewatch; Added on 29 January 2022	MPC; JPL

back to top
