= List of unnumbered minor planets: 2004 S =

This is a partial list of unnumbered minor planets for principal provisional designations assigned during 16–30 September 2004. As of April 2026, a total of 77 bodies remain unnumbered for this period. Objects for this year are listed on the following pages: A–B · C · D–E · F · G–H · J–O · P–Q · R_{i} · R_{ii} · R_{iii} · S · T_{i} · T_{ii} · T_{iii} · T_{iv} · U–V · W–X and Y. Also see previous and next year.

Near-Earth obj.	MBA (inner)	MBA (outer)	Centaur
Mars-crosser	MBA (middle)	Jupiter trojan	Trans-Neptunian obj.
Unclassified

== S ==
U	Designation	Class	Physical		Observations				Description and notes	Ref
U	Designation	Class	H	D	Opp.	Arc	Last	Used	Description and notes	Ref
7	2004 SA	AMO	26.1	21 m	single	1 day	17 Sep 2004	32	Disc.: Spacewatch	MPC · JPL
2	2004 SD	MCA	18.4	620 m	multiple	2004–2020	21 May 2020	85	Disc.: LINEAR; Alt.: 2012 KF6	MPC · JPL
0	2004 SL	MCA	17.81	940 m	multiple	2004-2024	17 Jan 2024	100	Disc.: LINEAR	MPC · JPL
6	2004 SR	APO	23.8	62 m	single	18 days	01 Oct 2004	73	Disc.: LINEAR	MPC · JPL
0	2004 SS	AMO	21.9	150 m	multiple	2004–2017	22 Nov 2017	293	Disc.: LINEAR; Potentially hazardous object	MPC · JPL
1	2004 SY	MBA-M	17.75	1.1 km	multiple	2004-2022	04 Feb 2022	53	Disc.: LINEAR	MPC · JPL
6	2004 SA1	APO	25.3	31 m	single	6 days	22 Sep 2004	33	Disc.: LINEAR; AMO at MPC	MPC · JPL
0	2004 SB1	APO	20.4	300 m	multiple	1995–2018	05 Aug 2018	246	Disc.: LINEAR	MPC · JPL
1	2004 SJ2	MBA-M	18.0	1.1 km	multiple	2004–2013	09 Nov 2013	29	Disc.: Spacewatch	MPC · JPL
4	2004 ST2	ATE	24.2	51 m	multiple	2004–2018	23 Sep 2018	64	Disc.: LINEAR	MPC · JPL
6	2004 SY4	APO	24.4	47 m	single	15 days	05 Oct 2004	51	Disc.: SSS; AMO at MPC	MPC · JPL
0	2004 SK5	MBA-I	18.61	560 m	multiple	2004–2021	14 Apr 2021	58	Disc.: Spacewatch	MPC · JPL
0	2004 SX5	MBA-I	18.8	520 m	multiple	2004–2016	02 Jan 2016	30	Disc.: Spacewatch	MPC · JPL
3	2004 SA7	MBA-I	19.0	470 m	multiple	2004–2019	19 Nov 2019	30	Disc.: Spacewatch	MPC · JPL
1	2004 SD8	MBA-I	19.71	330 m	multiple	2004-2022	11 Oct 2022	49	Disc.: Spacewatch	MPC · JPL
0	2004 SU8	MBA-I	18.6	570 m	multiple	2004–2020	23 Jan 2020	23	Disc.: LINEAR	MPC · JPL
0	2004 SA9	MBA-I	19.33	400 m	multiple	2004–2021	07 Nov 2021	78	Disc.: LINEAR	MPC · JPL
0	2004 SV10	MBA-M	17.73	1.2 km	multiple	2004–2021	07 Aug 2021	166	Disc.: SSS; Alt.: 2017 SX34	MPC · JPL
1	2004 SE19	MBA-I	18.7	540 m	multiple	2004–2019	29 Oct 2019	42	Disc.: LINEAR	MPC · JPL
9	2004 SA20	APO	22.8	98 m	single	17 days	08 Oct 2004	19	Disc.: LINEAR	MPC · JPL
1	2004 SA22	MBA-M	17.7	860 m	multiple	2000–2016	07 Aug 2016	32	Disc.: Spacewatch; Added on 21 August 2021	MPC · JPL
0	2004 SU23	MBA-M	18.27	660 m	multiple	2004–2021	08 Dec 2021	34	Disc.: Spacewatch	MPC · JPL
1	2004 SM24	MBA-O	17.11	2.1 km	multiple	2004–2021	25 Nov 2021	64	Disc.: Spacewatch; Alt.: 2021 QC33	MPC · JPL
0	2004 SW24	MBA-I	19.00	470 m	multiple	2004–2021	02 Oct 2021	54	Disc.: LPL/Spacewatch II; Alt.: 2011 UU378	MPC · JPL
1	2004 SD26	APO	18.7	650 m	multiple	2004–2007	20 Sep 2007	66	Disc.: LINEAR	MPC · JPL
8	2004 SE26	APO	25.8	25 m	single	2 days	23 Sep 2004	18	Disc.: LINEAR	MPC · JPL
0	2004 SQ26	HUN	19.3	410 m	multiple	2004–2021	15 Jan 2021	38	Disc.: Spacewatch	MPC · JPL
6	2004 SR26	APO	26.6	17 m	single	2 days	24 Sep 2004	26	Disc.: LINEAR; AMO at MPC	MPC · JPL
6	2004 SS26	APO	23.1	85 m	single	2 days	24 Sep 2004	32	Disc.: LINEAR	MPC · JPL
7	2004 ST26	APO	26.3	20 m	single	1 day	24 Sep 2004	25	Disc.: Spacewatch	MPC · JPL
9	2004 SU26	APO	24.9	37 m	single	1 day	24 Sep 2004	11	Disc.: LINEAR	MPC · JPL
9	2004 SW26	ATE	25.7	26 m	single	1 day	24 Sep 2004	24	Disc.: LPL/Spacewatch II	MPC · JPL
0	2004 SK34	MBA-O	17.9	1.5 km	multiple	2004–2018	11 Aug 2018	31	Disc.: Spacewatch	MPC · JPL
1	2004 SM34	MBA-O	17.23	2.0 km	multiple	2004–2021	04 Oct 2021	48	Disc.: Spacewatch	MPC · JPL
0	2004 SP34	MBA-M	18.0	1.1 km	multiple	2004–2017	17 Sep 2017	21	Disc.: Spacewatch	MPC · JPL
0	2004 SY34	MBA-M	17.86	1.1 km	multiple	2004–2021	01 Nov 2021	126	Disc.: LINEAR	MPC · JPL
1	2004 SS35	MBA-M	18.6	800 m	multiple	2004–2017	12 Aug 2017	20	Disc.: Spacewatch	MPC · JPL
0	2004 SA37	MBA-O	17.45	1.8 km	multiple	2004–2021	08 Nov 2021	71	Disc.: Spacewatch; Added on 21 August 2021; Alt.: 2010 PM42	MPC · JPL
0	2004 SO37	MBA-O	17.72	1.6 km	multiple	2004–2021	28 Nov 2021	54	Disc.: Spacewatch	MPC · JPL
0	2004 SH38	MBA-I	19.46	380 m	multiple	2004–2021	26 Oct 2021	79	Disc.: Spacewatch; Alt.: 2011 UY138	MPC · JPL
0	2004 SR43	MBA-I	18.93	490 m	multiple	2004–2021	30 Nov 2021	66	Disc.: LINEAR; Alt.: 2014 QR440	MPC · JPL
1	2004 SF44	MBA-M	18.51	1.4 km	multiple	2004-2019	08 Mar 2019	34	Disc.: LINEAR	MPC · JPL
3	2004 SW44	MBA-M	18.7	760 m	multiple	2004–2021	08 Dec 2021	47	Disc.: LINEAR	MPC · JPL
0	2004 SC47	MBA-I	18.2	680 m	multiple	2004–2019	20 Dec 2019	126	Disc.: LINEAR; Alt.: 2015 RX95	MPC · JPL
2	2004 SU50	MBA-M	18.3	1.2 km	multiple	2004–2013	22 Oct 2013	23	Disc.: LPL/Spacewatch II	MPC · JPL
2	2004 SW50	MBA-M	18.89	700 m	multiple	2004–2021	27 Oct 2021	34	Disc.: LPL/Spacewatch II; Added on 5 November 2021; Alt.: 2021 RT70	MPC · JPL
0	2004 SE51	MBA-O	18.07	1.4 km	multiple	2004–2021	27 Nov 2021	66	Disc.: LPL/Spacewatch II; Added on 5 November 2021	MPC · JPL
5	2004 SU55	AMO	24.7	41 m	single	81 days	12 Dec 2004	40	Disc.: LINEAR	MPC · JPL
3	2004 SC56	ATE	22.7	291 m	multiple	2004–2010	01 Sep 2010	161	Disc.: LINEAR	MPC · JPL
1	2004 SJ56	MBA-M	18.29	920 m	multiple	2004–2021	01 Nov 2021	48	Disc.: LONEOS; Added on 5 November 2021; Alt.: 2021 PG107	MPC · JPL
4	2004 SC60	TNO	7.2	131 km	multiple	2004–2023	18 Oct 2023	150	Disc.: Palomar Obs. LoUTNOs, res · 4:7	MPC · JPL
1	2004 SG61	MBA-I	18.6	570 m	multiple	2004–2016	04 Jan 2016	37	Disc.: LINEAR; Alt.: 2015 VP114	MPC · JPL
0	2004 SZ61	MBA-M	18.05	1.0 km	multiple	2004–2021	30 Jul 2021	48	Disc.: LPL/Spacewatch II; Alt.: 2015 BU194	MPC · JPL
0	2004 SF62	MBA-M	18.06	730 m	multiple	2002–2022	07 Jan 2022	26	Disc.: Spacewatch	MPC · JPL
0	2004 SH63	MBA-M	17.5	1.3 km	multiple	2004–2017	10 Oct 2017	43	Disc.: Spacewatch	MPC · JPL
0	2004 SM63	MBA-M	17.63	890 m	multiple	2004–2022	24 Jan 2022	62	Disc.: Spacewatch	MPC · JPL
2	2004 SS63	MBA-M	18.0	1.1 km	multiple	2004–2017	16 Oct 2017	37	Disc.: Spacewatch	MPC · JPL
0	2004 SV63	MBA-M	18.19	970 m	multiple	2004–2021	27 Sep 2021	76	Disc.: Spacewatch	MPC · JPL
0	2004 SY63	MBA-M	18.11	1.0 km	multiple	2004–2021	06 Nov 2021	92	Disc.: Spacewatch	MPC · JPL
0	2004 SA64	MBA-I	19.0	470 m	multiple	2004–2020	21 Jun 2020	38	Disc.: Spacewatch	MPC · JPL
1	2004 SB64	MBA-I	19.0	470 m	multiple	2004–2018	16 Jun 2018	24	Disc.: LPL/Spacewatch II	MPC · JPL
0	2004 SE64	MBA-I	18.5	590 m	multiple	2004–2019	04 Dec 2019	52	Disc.: Spacewatch	MPC · JPL
3	2004 SL64	MBA-I	18.7	540 m	multiple	2004–2020	22 Jan 2020	37	Disc.: Spacewatch	MPC · JPL
0	2004 SM64	MBA-I	18.3	650 m	multiple	2004–2020	22 Jan 2020	45	Disc.: LPL/Spacewatch II	MPC · JPL
0	2004 SP64	MBA-I	19.0	470 m	multiple	2004–2019	25 Sep 2019	30	Disc.: Spacewatch	MPC · JPL
0	2004 SB65	MBA-I	18.9	490 m	multiple	2004–2019	19 Dec 2019	61	Disc.: Spacewatch	MPC · JPL
0	2004 SM65	MBA-I	18.56	580 m	multiple	2004–2021	08 May 2021	41	Disc.: LPL/Spacewatch II	MPC · JPL
2	2004 ST65	MBA-I	18.9	490 m	multiple	2004–2021	08 Jun 2021	49	Disc.: Spacewatch; Added on 22 July 2020	MPC · JPL
0	2004 SX65	MBA-I	18.8	520 m	multiple	2004–2019	26 Sep 2019	21	Disc.: Spacewatch; Added on 17 January 2021	MPC · JPL
1	2004 SB66	MBA-M	17.8	820 m	multiple	2003–2020	18 Aug 2020	33	Disc.: LPL/Spacewatch II; Added on 17 June 2021	MPC · JPL
0	2004 SD66	MBA-O	17.21	2.0 km	multiple	2004–2021	26 Nov 2021	63	Disc.: Spacewatch; Added on 21 August 2021	MPC · JPL
2	2004 SE66	MBA-M	18.62	560 m	multiple	2004–2016	08 Aug 2016	32	Disc.: LPL/Spacewatch II; Added on 21 August 2021	MPC · JPL
0	2004 SF66	MBA-I	19.1	450 m	multiple	2004–2019	05 Nov 2019	30	Disc.: Spacewatch; Added on 21 August 2021	MPC · JPL
0	2004 SJ66	MBA-M	18.15	990 m	multiple	2004–2021	06 Nov 2021	48	Disc.: Spacewatch; Added on 30 September 2021	MPC · JPL
0	2004 SK66	MBA-I	19.07	460 m	multiple	2004–2021	08 Dec 2021	55	Disc.: LPL/Spacewatch II; Added on 5 November 2021	MPC · JPL
0	2004 SM66	MBA-O	17.50	1.8 km	multiple	2004–2021	07 Nov 2021	42	Disc.: Spacewatch; Added on 5 November 2021	MPC · JPL
0	2004 SN66	MBA-O	18.15	1.3 km	multiple	2004–2021	06 Nov 2021	25	Disc.: LPL/Spacewatch II; Added on 5 November 2021	MPC · JPL

back to top
