= List of unnumbered minor planets: 2004 T (100–199) =

This is a partial list of unnumbered minor planets for principal provisional designations assigned during 1–15 October 2004. Since this period yielded a high number of provisional discoveries, it is further split into several standalone pages. As of March 2026, a total of 110 bodies remain unnumbered for this period. Objects for this year are listed on the following pages: A–B · C · D–E · F · G–H · J–O · P–Q · R_{i} · R_{ii} · R_{iii} · S · T_{i} · T_{ii} · T_{iii} · T_{iv} · U–V · W–X and Y. Also see previous and next year.

Near-Earth obj.	MBA (inner)	MBA (outer)	Centaur
Mars-crosser	MBA (middle)	Jupiter trojan	Trans-Neptunian obj.
Unclassified

== T ==
U	Designation	Class	Physical		Observations				Description and notes	Ref
U	Designation	Class	H	D	Opp.	Arc	Last	Used	Description and notes	Ref
1	2004 TG101	MBA-O	17.9	1.5 km	multiple	2004–2019	25 Sep 2019	46	Disc.: LPL/Spacewatch II	MPC · JPL
1	2004 TM104	MBA-I	18.28	660 m	multiple	2004–2021	08 Jan 2021	36	Disc.: Spacewatch; Added on 17 June 2021	MPC · JPL
1	2004 TQ104	MBA-I	19.0	470 m	multiple	2004–2019	26 Sep 2019	21	Disc.: Spacewatch	MPC · JPL
1	2004 TW104	MBA-M	18.14	920 m	multiple	2004-2022	01 Dec 2022	56	Disc.: Spacewatch	MPC · JPL
2	2004 TZ104	MBA-O	17.9	1.5 km	multiple	2002–2019	12 Jun 2019	39	Disc.: Spacewatch; Alt.: 2009 QL53	MPC · JPL
1	2004 TD105	MBA-M	18.51	830 m	multiple	2004–2021	09 Nov 2021	37	Disc.: Spacewatch; Added on 5 November 2021	MPC · JPL
0	2004 TJ105	MBA-M	17.99	1.1 km	multiple	2004–2021	11 Sep 2021	75	Disc.: Spacewatch	MPC · JPL
0	2004 TS105	MBA-I	20.19	270 m	multiple	2004-2023	15 Oct 2023	50	Disc.: Spacewatch	MPC · JPL
0	2004 TN107	MBA-O	17.10	2.1 km	multiple	2004–2021	30 Oct 2021	34	Disc.: Spacewatch; Added on 5 November 2021; Alt.: 2021 RL88	MPC · JPL
0	2004 TX111	MBA-M	18.08	710 m	multiple	2004-2023	25 Mar 2023	39	Disc.: Spacewatch	MPC · JPL
0	2004 TY111	MBA-O	17.9	1.5 km	multiple	2004–2018	13 Aug 2018	22	Disc.: Spacewatch	MPC · JPL
1	2004 TE112	MBA-O	18.0	1.4 km	multiple	2004–2019	08 Nov 2019	43	Disc.: Spacewatch	MPC · JPL
–	2004 TJ112	MBA-M	18.3	650 m	single	8 days	15 Oct 2004	10	Disc.: Spacewatch	MPC · JPL
0	2004 TO113	MBA-O	17.5	1.8 km	multiple	2004–2021	05 Jan 2021	77	Disc.: NEAT; Alt.: 2014 OT18	MPC · JPL
0	2004 TH114	MBA-I	18.9	490 m	multiple	2004–2020	15 Feb 2020	50	Disc.: LPL/Spacewatch II	MPC · JPL
2	2004 TM120	MBA-M	18.01	1.1 km	multiple	2004–2021	08 Nov 2021	80	Disc.: NEAT; Added on 30 September 2021	MPC · JPL
0	2004 TP125	MBA-O	17.20	2.0 km	multiple	2004–2021	01 Dec 2021	99	Disc.: LINEAR; Alt.: 2015 UW61	MPC · JPL
0	2004 TJ134	MBA-O	16.92	2.5 km	multiple	2004–2022	05 Jan 2022	213	Disc.: NEAT	MPC · JPL
0	2004 TQ139	MBA-M	17.9	1.5 km	multiple	2004–2018	04 Dec 2018	89	Disc.: LONEOS; Alt.: 2015 BD436	MPC · JPL
0	2004 TS140	MBA-M	17.9	1.5 km	multiple	2004–2018	02 Nov 2018	29	Disc.: Spacewatch; Added on 19 October 2020	MPC · JPL
0	2004 TW142	MBA-I	19.36	400 m	multiple	2004–2020	21 Jul 2020	37	Disc.: Spacewatch	MPC · JPL
2	2004 TS146	MBA-M	18.4	1.2 km	multiple	2003–2017	27 May 2017	21	Disc.: Spacewatch	MPC · JPL
0	2004 TO147	MBA-O	17.48	1.8 km	multiple	2004–2021	02 Dec 2021	50	Disc.: Spacewatch; Alt.: 2015 TQ52	MPC · JPL
0	2004 TV147	MBA-I	19.3	410 m	multiple	2004–2015	08 Nov 2015	25	Disc.: Spacewatch; Alt.: 2015 VC77	MPC · JPL
0	2004 TK148	MBA-O	17.63	1.6 km	multiple	2004-2024	26 Dec 2024	63	Disc.: Spacewatch	MPC · JPL
1	2004 TS148	MBA-I	19.5	370 m	multiple	2004–2018	05 Oct 2018	30	Disc.: Spacewatch	MPC · JPL
1	2004 TC149	MBA-I	19.4	390 m	multiple	2004–2019	02 Jun 2019	29	Disc.: Spacewatch; Alt.: 2007 TL306	MPC · JPL
2	2004 TA150	MBA-M	18.5	590 m	multiple	2004–2020	14 Aug 2020	40	Disc.: Spacewatch; Alt.: 2008 RC117	MPC · JPL
2	2004 TF150	MBA-M	18.5	1.1 km	multiple	2004-2022	22 Sep 2022	26	Disc.: Spacewatch	MPC · JPL
2	2004 TW150	MBA-I	19.3	410 m	multiple	2004–2018	10 Nov 2018	36	Disc.: Spacewatch	MPC · JPL
–	2004 TQ151	MBA-O	18.0	1.4 km	single	8 days	14 Oct 2004	9	Disc.: Spacewatch	MPC · JPL
1	2004 TH152	MBA-M	18.5	590 m	multiple	2004–2020	22 Aug 2020	46	Disc.: Spacewatch	MPC · JPL
1	2004 TQ152	MBA-O	18.28	1.2 km	multiple	2004–2020	19 Nov 2020	35	Disc.: Spacewatch; Added on 17 January 2021	MPC · JPL
0	2004 TZ152	MBA-I	19.38	390 m	multiple	2004-2022	17 Oct 2022	50	Disc.: Spacewatch	MPC · JPL
–	2004 TE153	MBA-O	17.3	1.9 km	single	9 days	15 Oct 2004	9	Disc.: Spacewatch	MPC · JPL
0	2004 TJ153	MBA-I	18.6	570 m	multiple	2000–2018	14 Jun 2018	38	Disc.: Spacewatch	MPC · JPL
0	2004 TM153	MBA-I	18.6	570 m	multiple	2000–2019	03 Jul 2019	29	Disc.: Spacewatch	MPC · JPL
1	2004 TY153	MBA-I	19.93	310 m	multiple	2004–2021	07 Oct 2021	33	Disc.: Spacewatch; Added on 30 September 2021	MPC · JPL
0	2004 TZ153	MBA-I	18.6	570 m	multiple	2004–2019	22 Aug 2019	30	Disc.: Spacewatch	MPC · JPL
0	2004 TH154	MBA-O	17.33	1.9 km	multiple	2004–2021	27 Nov 2021	77	Disc.: Spacewatch; Alt.: 2015 VU46	MPC · JPL
0	2004 TU154	MBA-O	18.0	1.4 km	multiple	2004–2015	14 Jan 2015	26	Disc.: Spacewatch; Alt.: 2010 CA206	MPC · JPL
1	2004 TU155	MBA-M	18.5	590 m	multiple	2000–2018	20 Jan 2018	26	Disc.: Spacewatch	MPC · JPL
–	2004 TB156	MBA-M	18.3	650 m	single	9 days	15 Oct 2004	9	Disc.: Spacewatch	MPC · JPL
0	2004 TD156	MBA-I	19.1	450 m	multiple	2004–2019	28 Nov 2019	49	Disc.: Spacewatch	MPC · JPL
0	2004 TG156	MBA-I	18.3	650 m	multiple	2004–2021	14 Apr 2021	59	Disc.: Spacewatch; Alt.: 2004 TE386, 2015 TX217	MPC · JPL
0	2004 TH156	MBA-I	18.7	540 m	multiple	2000–2019	22 Oct 2019	46	Disc.: Cerro Tololo; Added on 21 August 2021; Alt.: 2000 OY71, 2004 TD386	MPC · JPL
0	2004 TJ156	MBA-O	17.21	2.0 km	multiple	2004–2021	09 Nov 2021	69	Disc.: Spacewatch	MPC · JPL
0	2004 TP156	MBA-O	17.3	1.9 km	multiple	2004–2021	30 Nov 2021	29	Disc.: Spacewatch; Added on 24 December 2021	MPC · JPL
0	2004 TT156	MBA-M	19.12	630 m	multiple	2004–2021	09 Nov 2021	53	Disc.: Spacewatch	MPC · JPL
0	2004 TO157	MBA-O	17.39	1.9 km	multiple	2004–2021	25 Nov 2021	61	Disc.: Spacewatch; Added on 19 October 2020	MPC · JPL
0	2004 TX158	MBA-I	18.7	540 m	multiple	2003–2019	17 Dec 2019	31	Disc.: Spacewatch	MPC · JPL
0	2004 TD159	MBA-I	18.9	490 m	multiple	2004–2015	09 Nov 2015	34	Disc.: Spacewatch; Alt.: 2015 TO66	MPC · JPL
0	2004 TK159	MBA-M	18.49	600 m	multiple	2004–2021	30 Nov 2021	38	Disc.: Spacewatch	MPC · JPL
0	2004 TT159	MBA-O	16.8	2.4 km	multiple	2004–2021	30 Nov 2021	46	Disc.: Spacewatch; Added on 29 January 2022	MPC · JPL
0	2004 TJ162	MBA-I	18.8	520 m	multiple	2004–2018	17 Aug 2018	33	Disc.: Spacewatch; Added on 17 June 2021; Alt.: 2004 VB117	MPC · JPL
0	2004 TF166	MBA-O	17.57	1.7 km	multiple	2004–2021	26 Nov 2021	57	Disc.: Spacewatch	MPC · JPL
2	2004 TJ166	MBA-O	17.86	1.5 km	multiple	2004-2020	13 Sep 2020	22	Disc.: Spacewatch	MPC · JPL
0	2004 TK166	MBA-M	18.2	1.3 km	multiple	2004–2018	10 Oct 2018	74	Disc.: Spacewatch; Alt.: 2017 HX56	MPC · JPL
5	2004 TS166	MBA-O	20.4	460 m	single	30 days	15 Oct 2004	12	Disc.: Spacewatch; MCA at MPC	MPC · JPL
0	2004 TX166	MBA-I	19.3	410 m	multiple	2004–2019	29 Oct 2019	41	Disc.: Spacewatch	MPC · JPL
1	2004 TD167	MBA-O	17.74	1.6 km	multiple	2004–2021	27 Nov 2021	55	Disc.: Spacewatch; Alt.: 2015 TV292	MPC · JPL
3	2004 TH167	MBA-M	18.4	590 m	multiple	2004-2022	09 Jan 2022	20	Disc.: Spacewatch	MPC · JPL
0	2004 TP167	MBA-M	17.6	1.7 km	multiple	2004–2018	15 Sep 2018	33	Disc.: Spacewatch	MPC · JPL
0	2004 TS176	MBA-O	18.46	1 km	multiple	2004–2020	15 Oct 2020	57	Disc.: LPL/Spacewatch II; Alt.: 2015 XL358, 2017 DE169	MPC · JPL
3	2004 TT176	MBA-I	19.3	410 m	multiple	1997–2018	04 Dec 2018	50	Disc.: Spacewatch; Alt.: 1997 SW16	MPC · JPL
2	2004 TA177	MBA-O	17.8	1.5 km	multiple	1993–2021	26 Nov 2021	28	Disc.: LPL/Spacewatch II; Added on 29 January 2022	MPC · JPL
1	2004 TA178	MBA-M	18.3	650 m	multiple	2004–2018	11 Feb 2018	61	Disc.: Spacewatch; Alt.: 2008 SO69	MPC · JPL
0	2004 TB178	MBA-M	17.4	1.4 km	multiple	2004–2017	24 Nov 2017	37	Disc.: Spacewatch	MPC · JPL
0	2004 TP180	MBA-O	17.1	2.1 km	multiple	2004–2020	24 Sep 2020	69	Disc.: Spacewatch	MPC · JPL
0	2004 TC181	MBA-O	17.6	1.7 km	multiple	2004–2020	14 Dec 2020	45	Disc.: Spacewatch; Added on 22 July 2020	MPC · JPL
1	2004 TN181	MBA-O	17.79	3.2 km	multiple	2004-2022	24 Mar 2022	42	Disc.: Spacewatch	MPC · JPL
1	2004 TS181	MBA-M	18.0	750 m	multiple	2004–2018	20 Jan 2018	28	Disc.: Spacewatch	MPC · JPL
1	2004 TD183	MBA-I	19.19	450 m	multiple	2004-2022	19 Dec 2022	24	Disc.: Spacewatch	MPC · JPL
0	2004 TR183	MBA-I	19.1	450 m	multiple	2004–2020	16 Oct 2020	65	Disc.: Spacewatch	MPC · JPL
1	2004 TW183	MBA-O	16.8	2.4 km	multiple	2004–2020	27 Apr 2020	53	Disc.: Spacewatch	MPC · JPL
–	2004 TX183	MBA-O	18.1	1.3 km	single	8 days	15 Oct 2004	9	Disc.: Spacewatch	MPC · JPL
2	2004 TY183	MBA-M	18.2	960 m	multiple	2004–2017	19 Nov 2017	23	Disc.: Spacewatch	MPC · JPL
0	2004 TE184	MBA-M	17.9	1.5 km	multiple	2004–2020	27 Apr 2020	56	Disc.: Spacewatch; Added on 22 July 2020; Alt.: 2010 EX19	MPC · JPL
1	2004 TG184	MBA-I	19.2	430 m	multiple	2004–2015	02 Nov 2015	24	Disc.: Spacewatch; Alt.: 2015 VW8	MPC · JPL
0	2004 TV184	MBA-M	18.2	1.3 km	multiple	2004–2018	18 Oct 2018	25	Disc.: Spacewatch	MPC · JPL
2	2004 TH185	MBA-O	18.5	1.1 km	multiple	2004–2020	22 Sep 2020	40	Disc.: Spacewatch	MPC · JPL
0	2004 TM185	MBA-M	18.0	1.4 km	multiple	2004–2018	06 Oct 2018	37	Disc.: Spacewatch; Alt.: 2009 WU202	MPC · JPL
1	2004 TW185	MBA-I	19.41	390 m	multiple	2004–2021	30 Nov 2021	31	Disc.: Spacewatch; Added on 5 November 2021	MPC · JPL
0	2004 TX185	MBA-O	17.86	1.5 km	multiple	2004–2021	26 Nov 2021	56	Disc.: Spacewatch; Alt.: 2014 HO102, 2015 PO32	MPC · JPL
2	2004 TZ185	MBA-M	18.99	670 m	multiple	2004–2021	30 Nov 2021	82	Disc.: Spacewatch	MPC · JPL
0	2004 TD186	MBA-M	17.8	1.5 km	multiple	2004–2017	17 Aug 2017	28	Disc.: Spacewatch	MPC · JPL
1	2004 TN186	MBA-I	19.3	410 m	multiple	2004–2015	09 Oct 2015	27	Disc.: Spacewatch	MPC · JPL
1	2004 TQ186	MBA-M	19.2	800 m	multiple	2004–2013	23 Oct 2013	22	Disc.: Spacewatch	MPC · JPL
1	2004 TS186	MBA-M	19.06	650 m	multiple	2004–2021	10 Oct 2021	42	Disc.: Spacewatch; Added on 5 November 2021	MPC · JPL
1	2004 TX187	MBA-M	18.9	700 m	multiple	2004–2021	09 Nov 2021	37	Disc.: Spacewatch	MPC · JPL
2	2004 TF188	MBA-M	19.45	580 m	multiple	2004-2025	10 Dec 2025	52	Disc.: Spacewatch	MPC · JPL
0	2004 TP188	MBA-O	17.63	1.7 km	multiple	1993–2021	09 Dec 2021	67	Disc.: Spacewatch	MPC · JPL
0	2004 TE189	MBA-I	19.14	540 m	multiple	2004-2022	27 Nov 2022	66	Disc.: Spacewatch	MPC · JPL
5	2004 TF189	MBA-O	17.6	1.7 km	multiple	2004–2020	22 Nov 2020	13	Disc.: Spacewatch	MPC · JPL
0	2004 TK189	MBA-I	19.2	430 m	multiple	2004–2018	20 Jan 2018	21	Disc.: Spacewatch	MPC · JPL
2	2004 TO189	MBA-I	18.8	520 m	multiple	2004–2020	29 Feb 2020	37	Disc.: Spacewatch	MPC · JPL
1	2004 TL190	MBA-O	18.14	1.3 km	multiple	2004-2024	06 Oct 2024	43	Disc.: Spacewatch	MPC · JPL
2	2004 TV191	MBA-O	17.4	1.8 km	multiple	2004–2020	25 Sep 2020	30	Disc.: Spacewatch; Alt.: 2013 EO134	MPC · JPL
0	2004 TE192	MBA-I	18.6	570 m	multiple	2004–2019	25 Sep 2019	34	Disc.: Spacewatch	MPC · JPL
2	2004 TF193	MBA-M	18.36	650 m	multiple	2004-2021	30 Nov 2021	27	Disc.: Spacewatch	MPC · JPL
0	2004 TX194	MBA-M	17.71	1.7 km	multiple	2004-2025	02 May 2025	42	Disc.: Spacewatch	MPC · JPL
1	2004 TA195	MBA-O	17.63	1.7 km	multiple	2004–2021	02 Dec 2021	56	Disc.: Spacewatch; Alt.: 2015 TO280	MPC · JPL
0	2004 TL195	MBA-I	18.5	590 m	multiple	2004–2015	12 Nov 2015	34	Disc.: Spacewatch; Added on 22 July 2020	MPC · JPL
3	2004 TA198	MBA-I	18.7	540 m	multiple	2004–2015	02 Nov 2015	37	Disc.: Spacewatch	MPC · JPL

back to top
