= List of unnumbered minor planets: 2004 D–E =

This is a partial list of unnumbered minor planets for principal provisional designations assigned between 16 February and 15 March 2004. As of May 2026, a total of 96 bodies remain unnumbered for this period. Objects for this year are listed on the following pages: A–B · C · D–E · F · G–H · J–O · P–Q · R_{i} · R_{ii} · R_{iii} · S · T_{i} · T_{ii} · T_{iii} · T_{iv} · U–V · W–X and Y. Also see previous and next year.

Near-Earth obj.	MBA (inner)	MBA (outer)	Centaur
Mars-crosser	MBA (middle)	Jupiter trojan	Trans-Neptunian obj.
Unclassified

== D ==
U	Designation	Class	Physical		Observations				Description and notes	Ref
U	Designation	Class	H	D	Opp.	Arc	Last	Used	Description and notes	Ref
7	2004 DB	MCA	20.1	280 m	single	4 days	18 Feb 2004	57	Disc.: SSS	MPC · JPL
-	2004 DX	MBA-I	17.8	820 m	single	3 days	19 Feb 2004	14	Disc.: LINEAR	MPC · JPL
0	2004 DK1	AMO	21.30	200 m	multiple	2004–2021	14 Aug 2021	540	Disc.: LINEAR	MPC · JPL
9	2004 DL1	APO	24.4	47 m	single	4 days	22 Feb 2004	14	Disc.: Spacewatch	MPC · JPL
8	2004 DF2	APO	26.1	21 m	single	3 days	22 Feb 2004	19	Disc.: LINEAR	MPC · JPL
–	2004 DX2	MBA-I	19.5	370 m	single	6 days	22 Feb 2004	12	Disc.: LPL/Spacewatch II	MPC · JPL
0	2004 DJ8	MBA-I	18.8	520 m	multiple	2004–2015	14 Apr 2015	27	Disc.: Spacewatch	MPC · JPL
0	2004 DP8	MBA-I	18.72	540 m	multiple	2004–2021	07 Nov 2021	42	Disc.: Spacewatch	MPC · JPL
0	2004 DS21	MBA-I	17.59	900 m	multiple	2004–2021	06 Apr 2021	148	Disc.: SSS	MPC · JPL
1	2004 DA30	MBA-O	18.0	1.4 km	multiple	2004–2020	11 May 2020	45	Disc.: LINEAR	MPC · JPL
1	2004 DZ43	MCA	20.32	320 m	multiple	2004-2026	07 Feb 2026	70	Disc.: LINEAR	MPC · JPL
0	2004 DM44	APO	20.7	260 m	multiple	2004–2007	08 Oct 2007	101	Disc.: LINEAR; Potentially hazardous object	MPC · JPL
8	2004 DA53	ATE	28.0	9 m	single	2 days	27 Feb 2004	17	Disc.: LINEAR	MPC · JPL
4	2004 DG64	TNO	7.57	99 km	multiple	2004-2017	23 Feb 2017	41	Disc.: Kitt Peak Obs. LoUTNOs, cubewano?	MPC · JPL
2	2004 DH64	TNO	5.9	220 km	multiple	2004–2021	15 Feb 2021	29	Disc.: Kitt Peak Obs. LoUTNOs, cubewano (cold); Alt.: 2006 CQ79	MPC · JPL
E	2004 DK64	TNO	7.4	138 km	single	19 days	16 Mar 2004	5	Disc.: Kitt Peak Obs. LoUTNOs, other TNO	MPC · JPL
E	2004 DL64	TNO	7.0	137 km	single	18 days	15 Mar 2004	5	Disc.: Kitt Peak Obs. LoUTNOs, cubewano?	MPC · JPL
5	2004 DM64	TNO	7.0	132 km	multiple	2004–2015	23 Mar 2015	16	Disc.: Kitt Peak Obs. LoUTNOs, cubewano (cold)	MPC · JPL
E	2004 DN64	TNO	7.6	100 km	single	18 days	15 Mar 2004	6	Disc.: Kitt Peak Obs. LoUTNOs, cubewano (cold)	MPC · JPL
1	2004 DG68	MBA-M	18.1	1.3 km	multiple	2004–2020	11 Oct 2020	29	Disc.: Kitt Peak Obs. Added on 17 January 2021	MPC · JPL
1	2004 DP68	MBA-O	17.2	2.0 km	multiple	2004–2021	07 Feb 2021	30	Disc.: Kitt Peak Obs. Alt.: 2010 KO92	MPC · JPL
0	2004 DT68	MBA-I	18.6	570 m	multiple	2004–2021	17 Apr 2021	34	Disc.: Kitt Peak Obs.	MPC · JPL
0	2004 DK69	MBA-O	17.2	2.0 km	multiple	2004–2018	05 Oct 2018	45	Disc.: Kitt Peak Obs. Alt.: 2015 BO384	MPC · JPL
E	2004 DK71	TNO	7.3	119 km	single	17 days	15 Mar 2004	4	Disc.: Kitt Peak Obs. LoUTNOs, cubewano?	MPC · JPL
4	2004 DL71	TNO	7.32	130 km	multiple	2004-2019	03 Apr 2019	51	Disc.: Kitt Peak Obs. LoUTNOs, cubewano?	MPC · JPL
4	2004 DM71	TNO	7.4	110 km	multiple	2004–2019	05 Apr 2019	13	Disc.: Kitt Peak Obs. LoUTNOs, cubewano (cold)	MPC · JPL
0	2004 DP73	MBA-O	17.1	2.1 km	multiple	2004–2021	04 Apr 2021	43	Disc.: Spacewatch; Added on 9 March 2021	MPC · JPL
0	2004 DH76	MBA-O	17.09	2.1 km	multiple	2004–2021	09 Apr 2021	42	Disc.: LPL/Spacewatch II; Alt.: 2015 BU327	MPC · JPL
0	2004 DO76	MBA-I	18.8	520 m	multiple	2004–2017	17 Mar 2017	33	Disc.: LPL/Spacewatch II	MPC · JPL
E	2004 DF77	TNO	7.7	120 km	single	17 days	15 Mar 2004	4	Disc.: Kitt Peak Obs. LoUTNOs, other TNO	MPC · JPL
5	2004 DG77	TNO	7.3	144 km	multiple	2004–2015	16 Mar 2015	11	Disc.: Kitt Peak Obs. LoUTNOs, other TNO	MPC · JPL
2	2004 DB79	MBA-I	19.4	390 m	multiple	2004–2020	15 Oct 2020	44	Disc.: Calar Alto	MPC · JPL
0	2004 DG83	MBA-I	18.34	640 m	multiple	2004–2022	07 Jan 2022	56	Disc.: SDSS	MPC · JPL
1	2004 DN83	MBA-O	17.9	1.5 km	multiple	2004–2017	27 Nov 2017	45	Disc.: LPL/Spacewatch II	MPC · JPL
0	2004 DT83	MBA-I	19.27	420 m	multiple	2004–2022	07 Jan 2022	41	Disc.: LPL/Spacewatch II	MPC · JPL
0	2004 DR84	MBA-M	17.18	2.0 km	multiple	2004–2022	26 Jan 2022	52	Disc.: Spacewatch	MPC · JPL
0	2004 DS84	MBA-M	17.9	1.1 km	multiple	2004–2021	16 Jan 2021	24	Disc.: Kitt Peak Obs.	MPC · JPL
0	2004 DB85	MBA-I	19.0	470 m	multiple	2004–2019	30 Aug 2019	84	Disc.: Spacewatch	MPC · JPL
0	2004 DA86	MBA-I	19.2	430 m	multiple	2004–2020	19 Jan 2020	46	Disc.: Kitt Peak Obs.	MPC · JPL
2	2004 DF86	MBA-I	18.5	590 m	multiple	2004–2019	19 Nov 2019	41	Disc.: Astrovirtel	MPC · JPL
0	2004 DM86	MBA-I	19.0	470 m	multiple	2004–2019	29 Sep 2019	33	Disc.: Kitt Peak Obs.	MPC · JPL
0	2004 DQ86	HUN	19.0	470 m	multiple	2000–2019	19 Dec 2019	44	Disc.: Kitt Peak Obs.	MPC · JPL
1	2004 DU86	MBA-M	18.6	800 m	multiple	2004–2019	28 Nov 2019	28	Disc.: Kitt Peak Obs.	MPC · JPL
0	2004 DT87	MBA-I	19.1	450 m	multiple	2004–2019	08 Jun 2019	31	Disc.: Kitt Peak Obs.	MPC · JPL
0	2004 DW87	MBA-I	19.0	470 m	multiple	2004–2018	07 Aug 2018	36	Disc.: Spacewatch	MPC · JPL
1	2004 DX87	MBA-M	18.4	620 m	multiple	2004–2020	20 Jan 2020	37	Disc.: Spacewatch	MPC · JPL
0	2004 DZ87	MBA-I	19.21	430 m	multiple	2004–2021	01 Dec 2021	34	Disc.: Kitt Peak Obs.	MPC · JPL
1	2004 DA88	MBA-O	17.6	1.7 km	multiple	2004–2019	05 Feb 2019	31	Disc.: Kitt Peak Obs.	MPC · JPL
0	2004 DB88	MBA-O	16.9	2.3 km	multiple	2004–2017	26 Jul 2017	40	Disc.: Kitt Peak Obs.	MPC · JPL
0	2004 DG88	MBA-I	18.4	620 m	multiple	2004–2020	14 Sep 2020	39	Disc.: LPL/Spacewatch II	MPC · JPL
0	2004 DH88	MBA-I	19.3	410 m	multiple	2004–2018	20 Jan 2018	37	Disc.: LPL/Spacewatch II	MPC · JPL
0	2004 DJ88	MBA-M	18.0	1.4 km	multiple	2004–2019	29 Jul 2019	32	Disc.: Kitt Peak Obs.	MPC · JPL
2	2004 DK88	MBA-M	18.2	680 m	multiple	2004–2020	27 Jan 2020	38	Disc.: Spacewatch	MPC · JPL
0	2004 DN88	MBA-I	18.8	520 m	multiple	2004–2020	17 Aug 2020	35	Disc.: Kitt Peak Obs.	MPC · JPL
0	2004 DT88	MBA-M	18.7	760 m	multiple	2004–2019	01 Oct 2019	51	Disc.: Astrovirtel	MPC · JPL
0	2004 DV88	MBA-O	18.0	1.4 km	multiple	2004–2020	03 Feb 2020	46	Disc.: Spacewatch	MPC · JPL
0	2004 DB89	MBA-O	17.6	1.7 km	multiple	2004–2019	05 Nov 2019	46	Disc.: Kitt Peak Obs.	MPC · JPL
0	2004 DD89	MBA-I	19.1	450 m	multiple	1995–2019	09 Jan 2019	32	Disc.: Kitt Peak Obs.	MPC · JPL
0	2004 DQ89	MBA-I	18.59	570 m	multiple	1993–2022	26 Jan 2022	49	Disc.: Kitt Peak Obs. Added on 22 July 2020	MPC · JPL
0	2004 DU89	MBA-I	19.07	460 m	multiple	2001–2021	11 Jun 2021	48	Disc.: Spacewatch; Added on 11 May 2021	MPC · JPL

back to top

== E ==
U	Designation	Class	Physical		Observations				Description and notes	Ref
U	Designation	Class	H	D	Opp.	Arc	Last	Used	Description and notes	Ref
0	2004 EU	MCA	18.2	680 m	multiple	2004–2020	05 Nov 2020	175	Disc.: NEAT	MPC · JPL
0	2004 EH1	APO	22.26	140 m	multiple	2004-2024	19 Feb 2024	127	Disc.: CSS	MPC · JPL
3	2004 EJ1	AMO	21.7	160 m	single	103 days	30 May 2004	151	Disc.: LINEAR	MPC · JPL
0	2004 EK20	MCA	19.2	800 m	multiple	2004–2013	18 Mar 2013	71	Disc.: LINEAR; Alt.: 2013 EM11	MPC · JPL
8	2004 EL20	ATE	26.7	16 m	single	3 days	16 Mar 2004	20	Disc.: LINEAR	MPC · JPL
8	2004 ER21	ATE	24.4	47 m	single	11 days	25 Mar 2004	70	Disc.: LINEAR	MPC · JPL
2	2004 ET21	AMO	20.5	280 m	multiple	2004–2009	14 Oct 2009	42	Disc.: Spacewatch	MPC · JPL
0	2004 EU22	APO	23.7	65 m	multiple	2004–2018	13 Apr 2018	187	Disc.: LINEAR	MPC · JPL
0	2004 EU27	MBA-M	18.45	860 m	multiple	2004–2021	03 May 2021	53	Disc.: Spacewatch	MPC · JPL
0	2004 EX28	MBA-O	17.7	1.6 km	multiple	2004–2020	26 Apr 2020	46	Disc.: Spacewatch	MPC · JPL
0	2004 EZ28	MBA-I	18.6	570 m	multiple	2004–2019	21 Sep 2019	32	Disc.: Spacewatch	MPC · JPL
2	2004 EF29	MBA-O	17.37	1.9 km	multiple	2004–2021	08 Nov 2021	36	Disc.: LPL/Spacewatch II; Added on 24 December 2021	MPC · JPL
9	2004 EG30	MBA-I	19.1	450 m	multiple	2004–2020	17 Nov 2020	26	Disc.: Spacewatch; Alt.: 2020 UF37	MPC · JPL
2	2004 EC45	MBA-O	17.6	1.7 km	multiple	2004–2021	10 May 2021	40	Disc.: Spacewatch; Added on 21 August 2021; Alt.: 2015 EM41	MPC · JPL
0	2004 EQ46	MBA-I	19.24	420 m	multiple	2004–2020	14 Dec 2020	28	Disc.: Spacewatch; Alt.: 2011 FX53	MPC · JPL
2	2004 EB47	MBA-O	18.20	1.3 km	multiple	2004–2021	30 May 2021	22	Disc.: Spacewatch	MPC · JPL
0	2004 ET48	MBA-O	17.71	1.7 km	multiple	2004-2021	13 Jul 2021	89	Disc.: CSS	MPC · JPL
0	2004 EG56	MCA	17.6	1.7 km	multiple	2004–2018	05 Oct 2018	65	Disc.: NEAT	MPC · JPL
1	2004 ET67	MBA-I	18.8	520 m	multiple	2004–2017	26 Jan 2017	38	Disc.: Spacewatch	MPC · JPL
0	2004 EO72	MBA-I	19.16	440 m	multiple	2004–2022	25 Jan 2022	42	Disc.: CSS; Alt.: 2015 FK359	MPC · JPL
8	2004 EO95	TNO	6.88	207 km	multiple	2004-2026	25 Mar 2026	21	Disc.: Kitt Peak Obs. LoUTNOs, cubewano?	MPC · JPL
4	2004 EP95	TNO	6.81	195 km	multiple	2004–2026	07 Jul 2026	63	Disc.: Kitt Peak Obs. LoUTNOs, cubewano (hot)	MPC · JPL
4	2004 EQ95	TNO	7.82	114 km	multiple	2004-2019	04 Apr 2019	24	Disc.: Kitt Peak Obs. Alt.: 2019 CK30; LoUTNOs, cubewano?	MPC · JPL
E	2004 ER95	TNO	6.3	189 km	single	72 days	26 May 2004	5	Disc.: Kitt Peak Obs. LoUTNOs, cubewano?	MPC · JPL
5	2004 ES95	TNO	6.8	145 km	multiple	1999–2014	30 May 2014	23	Disc.: Kitt Peak Obs. LoUTNOs, cubewano (cold)	MPC · JPL
E	2004 ET95	TNO	7.3	119 km	single	1 day	16 Mar 2004	3	Disc.: Kitt Peak Obs. LoUTNOs, cubewano?	MPC · JPL
4	2004 EV95	TNO	7.6	143 km	multiple	2004–2019	06 Jun 2019	23	Disc.: Kitt Peak Obs. LoUTNOs, plutino	MPC · JPL
3	2004 EG96	TNO	8.11	86 km	multiple	2004–2021	09 Jul 2021	29	Disc.: Kitt Peak Obs. LoUTNOs, res · 2:5, BR-mag: 1.39; taxonomy: BR-IR	MPC · JPL
2	2004 EJ96	TNO	8.0	119 km	multiple	2004–2013	14 May 2013	24	Disc.: Kitt Peak Obs. LoUTNOs, plutino Alt.: 2004 HE64	MPC · JPL
1	2004 EV96	MBA-I	19.0	470 m	multiple	2004–2015	23 May 2015	32	Disc.: NEAT	MPC · JPL
0	2004 EG100	MBA-I	18.32	640 m	multiple	2004–2021	31 Oct 2021	40	Disc.: Spacewatch	MPC · JPL
2	2004 EO100	MBA-I	18.9	490 m	multiple	2004–2019	02 May 2019	33	Disc.: Spacewatch	MPC · JPL
0	2004 EQ107	MBA-O	17.52	1.7 km	multiple	2004–2021	07 Apr 2021	44	Disc.: Spacewatch; Added on 22 July 2020	MPC · JPL
0	2004 EY108	MBA-I	19.1	450 m	multiple	2004–2017	09 Dec 2017	51	Disc.: Spacewatch; Alt.: 2006 VO29	MPC · JPL
0	2004 ED117	MBA-O	17.2	2.0 km	multiple	2004–2018	13 Jan 2018	35	Disc.: Spacewatch	MPC · JPL
0	2004 ES117	MBA-I	19.17	440 m	multiple	2004–2022	27 Jan 2022	32	Disc.: Spacewatch	MPC · JPL

back to top
