= List of unnumbered minor planets: 2004 Y =

This is a partial list of unnumbered minor planets for principal provisional designations assigned during 16–31 December 2004. As of March 2026, a total of 29 bodies remain unnumbered for this period. Objects for this year are listed on the following pages: A–B · C · D–E · F · G–H · J–O · P–Q · R_{i} · R_{ii} · R_{iii} · S · T_{i} · T_{ii} · T_{iii} · T_{iv} · U–V · W–X and Y. Also see previous and next year.

Near-Earth obj.	MBA (inner)	MBA (outer)	Centaur
Mars-crosser	MBA (middle)	Jupiter trojan	Trans-Neptunian obj.
Unclassified

== Y ==
U	Designation	Class	Physical		Observations				Description and notes	Ref
U	Designation	Class	H	D	Opp.	Arc	Last	Used	Description and notes	Ref
8	2004 YA	APO	24.9	37 m	single	2 days	18 Dec 2004	19	Disc.: LINEAR	MPC · JPL
8	2004 YC	ATE	25.6	27 m	single	5 days	19 Dec 2004	35	Disc.: LINEAR	MPC · JPL
8	2004 YD	ATE	24.0	56 m	single	9 days	26 Dec 2004	22	Disc.: LONEOS	MPC · JPL
6	2004 YE	AMO	24.9	37 m	single	19 days	03 Jan 2005	21	Disc.: LINEAR	MPC · JPL
8	2004 YQ	APO	24.4	47 m	single	2 days	20 Dec 2004	18	Disc.: LINEAR	MPC · JPL
0	2004 YR	APO	20.3	310 m	multiple	2004–2014	01 Jul 2014	134	Disc.: LINEAR	MPC · JPL
2	2004 YG1	APO	21.4	190 m	multiple	2004–2013	02 Aug 2013	94	Disc.: LINEAR	MPC · JPL
5	2004 YJ1	AMO	20.7	260 m	single	15 days	02 Jan 2005	51	Disc.: LINEAR	MPC · JPL
0	2004 YK1	AMO	21.3	200 m	multiple	2004–2018	20 Mar 2018	47	Disc.: LINEAR	MPC · JPL
8	2004 YA5	ATE	22.6	110 m	single	13 days	31 Dec 2004	30	Disc.: LINEAR	MPC · JPL
1	2004 YB5	MCA	18.0	1.4 km	multiple	2000-2004	21 Dec 2004	41	Disc.: LINEAR	MPC · JPL
6	2004 YD5	APO	29.3	5 m	single	1 day	21 Dec 2004	21	Disc.: Spacewatch	MPC · JPL
0	2004 YW5	MCA	19.12	450 m	multiple	2004–2022	08 Jan 2022	79	Disc.: Spacewatch	MPC · JPL
0	2004 YD13	MBA-I	18.4	620 m	multiple	2004–2018	10 Dec 2018	25	Disc.: MLS	MPC · JPL
0	2004 YU15	MBA-O	17.5	1.8 km	multiple	2002–2021	13 Feb 2021	35	Disc.: MLS; Added on 11 May 2021	MPC · JPL
0	2004 YX18	MBA-M	17.59	1.7 km	multiple	2004–2021	11 Sep 2021	61	Disc.: MLS; Alt.: 2013 YE106	MPC · JPL
4	2004 YY23	AMO	19.4	470 m	single	44 days	04 Feb 2005	157	Disc.: CSS	MPC · JPL
0	2004 YF28	HUN	19.03	460 m	multiple	2004–2022	06 Jan 2022	23	Disc.: Spacewatch; Added on 24 December 2021	MPC · JPL
1	2004 YY34	MBA-O	17.14	2.1 km	multiple	2004–2021	26 Nov 2021	59	Disc.: MLS; Added on 5 November 2021	MPC · JPL
0	2004 YG39	MBA-I	19.02	470 m	multiple	2004–2021	31 Aug 2021	33	Disc.: Spacewatch	MPC · JPL
2	2004 YJ39	MBA-M	18.0	1.1 km	multiple	2004–2018	18 Feb 2018	28	Disc.: MLS	MPC · JPL
0	2004 YT39	MBA-I	19.0	470 m	multiple	2004–2019	03 Dec 2019	58	Disc.: MLS	MPC · JPL
0	2004 YD40	MBA-I	19.16	440 m	multiple	2004–2021	13 Jul 2021	48	Disc.: MLS	MPC · JPL
0	2004 YF41	MBA-I	18.7	540 m	multiple	2004–2020	23 Jan 2020	46	Disc.: Spacewatch	MPC · JPL
0	2004 YH41	MBA-I	18.6	570 m	multiple	2004–2020	30 Jan 2020	51	Disc.: Spacewatch; Added on 22 July 2020	MPC · JPL
0	2004 YJ41	MBA-I	18.2	680 m	multiple	2004–2019	29 Apr 2019	46	Disc.: MLS; Added on 22 July 2020	MPC · JPL
0	2004 YN41	MBA-I	18.8	520 m	multiple	2004–2020	22 Mar 2020	35	Disc.: MLS; Added on 22 July 2020	MPC · JPL
0	2004 YO41	MBA-I	18.6	570 m	multiple	2004–2020	21 Mar 2020	33	Disc.: MLS; Added on 22 July 2020	MPC · JPL
0	2004 YB42	MBA-O	17.64	1.7 km	multiple	2004–2021	18 Jan 2021	38	Disc.: MLS; Added on 5 November 2021	MPC · JPL

back to top
