= List of unnumbered minor planets: 2004 R (300–619) =

This is a partial list of unnumbered minor planets for principal provisional designations assigned during 1–15 September 2004. Since this period yielded a high number of provisional discoveries, it is further split into several standalone pages. As of April 2026, a total of 103 bodies remain unnumbered for this period. Objects for this year are listed on the following pages: A–B · C · D–E · F · G–H · J–O · P–Q · R_{i} · R_{ii} · R_{iii} · S · T_{i} · T_{ii} · T_{iii} · T_{iv} · U–V · W–X and Y. Also see previous and next year.

Near-Earth obj.	MBA (inner)	MBA (outer)	Centaur
Mars-crosser	MBA (middle)	Jupiter trojan	Trans-Neptunian obj.
Unclassified

== R ==
U	Designation	Class	Physical		Observations				Description and notes	Ref
U	Designation	Class	H	D	Opp.	Arc	Last	Used	Description and notes	Ref
0	2004 RN302	MBA-O	17.5	1.8 km	multiple	2003–2021	30 Nov 2021	36	Disc.: Spacewatch; Added on 29 January 2022	MPC · JPL
2	2004 RP302	MBA-M	18.78	520 m	multiple	2004–2021	29 Nov 2021	27	—	MPC · JPL
0	2004 RR302	MCA	19.61	360 m	multiple	2004–2021	06 Nov 2021	74	Disc.: Spacewatch; Added on 30 September 2021; Alt.: 2011 UK477	MPC · JPL
1	2004 RT303	MBA-O	17.66	1.6 km	multiple	2004–2021	04 Nov 2021	22	Alt.: 2015 TN12	MPC · JPL
0	2004 RV303	MBA-O	17.32	1.9 km	multiple	2004–2021	27 Nov 2021	60	—	MPC · JPL
0	2004 RC304	MBA-O	17.87	1.5 km	multiple	2004–2021	26 Nov 2021	50	—	MPC · JPL
0	2004 RL304	MBA-M	18.11	1.0 km	multiple	2004–2021	05 Oct 2021	65	—	MPC · JPL
0	2004 RY304	MBA-O	17.71	1.6 km	multiple	2004–2021	28 Oct 2021	58	Disc.: Spacewatch; Added on 30 September 2021; Alt.: 2010 UW38	MPC · JPL
0	2004 RH307	MBA-M	17.8	1.5 km	multiple	2004–2019	07 Jan 2019	64	—	MPC · JPL
1	2004 RF314	MBA-I	19.43	390 m	multiple	2004–2022	06 Jan 2022	26	—	MPC · JPL
0	2004 RV314	MBA-I	18.5	590 m	multiple	2004–2019	27 Nov 2019	52	— Added on 22 July 2020; Alt.: 2015 RN158	MPC · JPL
0	2004 RN315	MBA-M	17.83	1.1 km	multiple	2004–2021	06 Dec 2021	95	Alt.: 2017 VV33	MPC · JPL
0	2004 RL318	MBA-I	18.2	680 m	multiple	2004–2019	31 Dec 2019	67	—	MPC · JPL
1	2004 RQ318	MBA-I	18.9	490 m	multiple	2004–2017	26 Aug 2017	27	—	MPC · JPL
0	2004 RV318	MBA-M	17.34	1.9 km	multiple	2004–2021	11 May 2021	45	—	MPC · JPL
0	2004 RC321	MCA	18.6	570 m	multiple	2004–2020	19 May 2020	42	—	MPC · JPL
0	2004 RA325	MBA-M	17.2	2.0 km	multiple	2004–2019	03 Jan 2019	62	Alt.: 2013 VF7	MPC · JPL
0	2004 RD328	MBA-M	17.78	1.2 km	multiple	2004–2021	11 Sep 2021	49	—	MPC · JPL
0	2004 RF329	MBA-I	18.6	570 m	multiple	2004–2020	19 Oct 2020	116	—	MPC · JPL
0	2004 RM330	MBA-I	19.09	450 m	multiple	2004–2021	05 Oct 2021	58	Disc.: Spacewatch; Added on 21 August 2021	MPC · JPL
0	2004 RO330	MBA-I	18.7	540 m	multiple	2004–2020	08 Oct 2020	62	Disc.: Spacewatch; Added on 19 October 2020; Alt.: 2016 FM2	MPC · JPL
2	2004 RY336	MBA-I	19.48	370 m	multiple	2004-2021	04 Sep 2021	26	—	MPC · JPL
0	2004 RD338	MBA-O	17.48	1.8 km	multiple	2004–2022	22 Jan 2022	53	—	MPC · JPL
2	2004 RM338	MBA-M	18.0	1.1 km	multiple	2004–2017	23 Oct 2017	21	—	MPC · JPL
0	2004 RC341	MBA-O	17.05	2.8 km	multiple	2004-2022	04 Jan 2022	35	—	MPC · JPL
1	2004 RK341	MBA-M	17.5	1.3 km	multiple	2004–2013	09 Nov 2013	22	—	MPC · JPL
1	2004 RN341	MBA-M	17.4	1.4 km	multiple	2004–2017	19 Nov 2017	58	—	MPC · JPL
0	2004 RF346	MBA-M	17.9	1.5 km	multiple	2004–2018	04 Dec 2018	59	Alt.: 2018 VH60	MPC · JPL
4	2004 RH347	MBA-O	17.9	1.5 km	multiple	2004–2021	13 Sep 2021	16	Disc.: Mauna Kea Obs. Added on 29 January 2022	MPC · JPL
0	2004 RA348	MBA-I	19.83	320 m	multiple	2003–2021	09 May 2021	31	Alt.: 2011 RH7	MPC · JPL
0	2004 RG348	MBA-O	17.1	2.1 km	multiple	2004–2021	12 Sep 2021	37	Disc.: Mauna Kea Obs. Added on 30 September 2021; Alt.: 2014 GR17, 2021 PD88	MPC · JPL
0	2004 RM348	MBA-M	17.6	1.7 km	multiple	2004–2018	06 Oct 2018	35	—	MPC · JPL
0	2004 RO348	MBA-M	18.3	920 m	multiple	2004–2020	22 Apr 2020	44	— Added on 22 July 2020; Alt.: 2015 DP5	MPC · JPL
1	2004 RU349	MBA-O	17.9	1.5 km	multiple	2004–2019	20 Oct 2019	28	— Added on 22 July 2020	MPC · JPL
3	2004 RN350	MBA-O	18.1	1.3 km	multiple	2004–2020	23 Sep 2020	28	Disc.: Mauna Kea Obs. Added on 17 January 2021; Alt.: 2007 CR74	MPC · JPL
0	2004 RQ351	MBA-O	17.98	1.4 km	multiple	2004–2021	28 Nov 2021	32	Disc.: Mauna Kea Obs. Added on 29 January 2022	MPC · JPL
0	2004 RY351	MBA-O	17.77	1.6 km	multiple	2004–2022	27 Jan 2022	38	Disc.: Mauna Kea Obs. Added on 17 January 2021	MPC · JPL
1	2004 RG352	MBA-O	18.07	1.4 km	multiple	2004–2021	02 Dec 2021	32	—	MPC · JPL
–	2004 RO352	MBA-O	18.4	1.2 km	single	29 days	11 Oct 2004	6	—	MPC · JPL
0	2004 RS352	MBA-M	18.6	800 m	multiple	2004–2019	04 Feb 2019	21	—	MPC · JPL
2	2004 RA353	MBA-M	18.9	700 m	multiple	2004–2021	29 Oct 2021	31	Disc.: Spacewatch; Added on 24 December 2021	MPC · JPL
4	2004 RH353	MBA-O	18.6	1.1 km	multiple	2004–2020	15 Oct 2020	22	Disc.: Mauna Kea Obs. Added on 19 October 2020	MPC · JPL
1	2004 RJ353	MBA-O	17.90	1.5 km	multiple	2004–2021	30 Oct 2021	29	Disc.: Mauna Kea Obs. Added on 5 November 2021	MPC · JPL
1	2004 RN353	MBA-I	18.57	370 m	multiple	2004-2025	02 Oct 2025	32	—	MPC · JPL
0	2004 RR353	MBA-O	17.71	1.8 km	multiple	2004-2024	13 Jun 2024	25	—	MPC · JPL
0	2004 RF354	MBA-O	18.29	1.2 km	multiple	2004–2021	10 Aug 2021	35	—	MPC · JPL
0	2004 RQ354	MBA-M	19.03	680 m	multiple	2004-2023	18 Aug 2023	52	—	MPC · JPL
–	2004 RO356	MBA-I	20.4	250 m	single	12 days	24 Sep 2004	9	—	MPC · JPL
1	2004 RV356	MBA-I	18.1	710 m	multiple	2004–2016	22 Dec 2016	41	Alt.: 2012 TF186	MPC · JPL
8	2004 RH357	APO	23.28	78 m	single	11 days	22 Sep 2004	14	—	MPC · JPL
0	2004 RX359	MBA-I	18.4	620 m	multiple	2004–2019	19 Nov 2019	64	—	MPC · JPL
0	2004 RV360	MBA-I	18.9	490 m	multiple	2004–2019	08 Nov 2019	49	—	MPC · JPL
0	2004 RW360	MBA-I	19.42	390 m	multiple	2004–2021	30 Nov 2021	76	—	MPC · JPL
0	2004 RZ360	MBA-I	18.9	490 m	multiple	2004–2017	23 Sep 2017	32	—	MPC · JPL
0	2004 RB361	MBA-M	19.39	560 m	multiple	2004–2021	03 Oct 2021	38	—	MPC · JPL
0	2004 RC361	MCA	19.2	430 m	multiple	2004–2017	18 Aug 2017	29	—	MPC · JPL
1	2004 RD361	MBA-M	18.47	850 m	multiple	2004–2021	01 Oct 2021	26	—	MPC · JPL
3	2004 RG361	MBA-I	19.8	330 m	multiple	2004–2017	21 Sep 2017	16	—	MPC · JPL
0	2004 RB362	MBA-I	18.6	570 m	multiple	2004–2020	18 Feb 2020	62	Alt.: 2015 OX147, 2019 WG13	MPC · JPL
0	2004 RC362	MBA-I	18.4	620 m	multiple	2004–2019	31 Oct 2019	58	—	MPC · JPL
2	2004 RS362	MBA-I	18.6	570 m	multiple	2004–2018	13 Nov 2018	42	—	MPC · JPL
0	2004 RV362	MBA-I	18.5	590 m	multiple	2004–2019	22 Sep 2019	41	—	MPC · JPL
1	2004 RW362	MBA-O	18.3	1.2 km	multiple	2004–2019	28 Oct 2019	39	—	MPC · JPL
0	2004 RB363	MBA-I	19.1	450 m	multiple	2004–2019	27 Nov 2019	44	—	MPC · JPL
0	2004 RE363	MBA-I	19.28	410 m	multiple	2004–2021	07 Sep 2021	36	—	MPC · JPL
0	2004 RF363	MBA-I	18.8	520 m	multiple	2004–2019	27 Oct 2019	32	—	MPC · JPL
0	2004 RG363	MBA-M	18.1	1.3 km	multiple	2004–2018	12 Nov 2018	28	—	MPC · JPL
0	2004 RH363	MBA-M	17.7	1.6 km	multiple	2004–2018	06 Oct 2018	40	—	MPC · JPL
0	2004 RJ363	MBA-I	18.7	540 m	multiple	2004–2019	21 Sep 2019	23	—	MPC · JPL
0	2004 RK363	MBA-M	18.0	1.4 km	multiple	2004–2020	16 Mar 2020	42	—	MPC · JPL
0	2004 RC364	MBA-I	18.5	590 m	multiple	2004–2019	27 Oct 2019	38	—	MPC · JPL
3	2004 RD364	MBA-O	17.8	1.5 km	multiple	2004–2019	29 Jul 2019	26	—	MPC · JPL
2	2004 RL364	MBA-I	19.9	310 m	multiple	2004–2014	19 Sep 2014	19	—	MPC · JPL
0	2004 RV364	MBA-O	16.75	2.5 km	multiple	2004–2021	15 Apr 2021	42	—	MPC · JPL
0	2004 RX364	MBA-M	18.0	1.1 km	multiple	2004–2017	16 Aug 2017	50	—	MPC · JPL
0	2004 RD365	MBA-M	18.68	770 m	multiple	2004–2021	09 Aug 2021	42	—	MPC · JPL
1	2004 RG365	MBA-I	18.5	590 m	multiple	2003–2016	01 Dec 2016	35	— Added on 22 July 2020	MPC · JPL
3	2004 RJ365	MCA	20.2	270 m	multiple	2004–2018	02 Nov 2018	30	— Added on 22 July 2020	MPC · JPL
1	2004 RM365	MBA-M	18.2	680 m	multiple	2004–2020	17 Aug 2020	45	Disc.: Spacewatch; Added on 19 October 2020	MPC · JPL
1	2004 RN365	MBA-M	18.1	710 m	multiple	2004–2020	11 Oct 2020	53	Disc.: Spacewatch; Added on 19 October 2020	MPC · JPL
1	2004 RP365	MBA-M	18.8	520 m	multiple	2004–2020	14 Sep 2020	45	Disc.: Spacewatch; Added on 19 October 2020	MPC · JPL
0	2004 RR365	MBA-I	19.25	420 m	multiple	2004–2021	13 Jul 2021	45	Disc.: Spacewatch; Added on 19 October 2020	MPC · JPL
1	2004 RS365	MBA-I	19.1	450 m	multiple	2004–2018	06 Oct 2018	36	Disc.: Spacewatch; Added on 19 October 2020	MPC · JPL
1	2004 RT365	MBA-O	17.46	1.8 km	multiple	2004–2021	13 Oct 2021	32	Disc.: Spacewatch; Added on 19 October 2020	MPC · JPL
1	2004 RV365	MBA-O	17.6	1.7 km	multiple	2004–2020	12 Sep 2020	31	Disc.: Spacewatch; Added on 19 October 2020	MPC · JPL
1	2004 RW365	MBA-M	18.0	750 m	multiple	2000–2020	14 Aug 2020	23	Disc.: Spacewatch; Added on 19 October 2020	MPC · JPL
0	2004 RY365	MBA-I	19.5	370 m	multiple	2000–2019	25 Apr 2019	28	Disc.: LPL/Spacewatch II; Added on 17 January 2021	MPC · JPL
1	2004 RA366	MBA-O	17.1	2.1 km	multiple	2004–2020	14 Sep 2020	52	Disc.: Spacewatch; Added on 17 January 2021	MPC · JPL
0	2004 RH366	MBA-I	18.85	500 m	multiple	2004–2021	07 Jun 2021	66	Disc.: Pan-STARRS 1 Added on 11 May 2021	MPC · JPL
0	2004 RJ366	MBA-M	18.3	1.2 km	multiple	2004–2021	08 Apr 2021	29	Disc.: Pan-STARRS 1 Added on 11 May 2021	MPC · JPL
0	2004 RL366	MBA-M	17.9	1.5 km	multiple	2004–2018	05 Oct 2018	28	Disc.: Spacewatch; Added on 17 June 2021	MPC · JPL
1	2004 RM366	MBA-I	18.9	490 m	multiple	2004–2015	10 Oct 2015	19	Disc.: Spacewatch; Added on 21 August 2021	MPC · JPL
0	2004 RO366	MBA-I	18.54	580 m	multiple	2004–2019	26 Sep 2019	39	Disc.: MLS; Added on 21 August 2021	MPC · JPL
0	2004 RP366	MBA-M	19.11	630 m	multiple	2004–2021	07 Nov 2021	53	Disc.: Spacewatch; Added on 30 September 2021	MPC · JPL
0	2004 RQ366	MBA-O	17.46	1.8 km	multiple	2004–2021	06 Oct 2021	38	Disc.: Kitt Peak Obs. Added on 5 November 2021	MPC · JPL
0	2004 RR366	MBA-O	17.09	2.1 km	multiple	2004–2021	28 Nov 2021	63	Disc.: Spacewatch; Added on 5 November 2021	MPC · JPL
0	2004 RS366	MBA-O	17.9	1.5 km	multiple	2004–2021	10 Oct 2021	40	Disc.: Spacewatch; Added on 5 November 2021	MPC · JPL
0	2004 RV366	MBA-M	17.9	780 m	multiple	2004–2021	24 Nov 2021	21	Disc.: Spacewatch; Added on 24 December 2021	MPC · JPL
0	2004 RX366	MBA-M	17.7	1.6 km	multiple	2004–2018	08 Nov 2018	29	Disc.: NEAT; Added on 24 December 2021	MPC · JPL
1	2004 RY366	MBA-M	18.4	620 m	multiple	2004–2021	26 Nov 2021	28	Disc.: Spacewatch; Added on 24 December 2021	MPC · JPL
0	2004 RZ366	MBA-M	19.0	670 m	multiple	2004–2021	02 Oct 2021	27	Disc.: No observations Added on 29 January 2022	MPC · JPL

back to top
