= 2004 TN1 =

Near-Earth asteroid

2004 TN_{1}
Discovery
- Discovered by: NEAT
- Discovery site: Palomar Obs.
- Discovery date: 5 October 2004 (first observed only)

Designations
- Minor planet category: Apollo · NEO · PHA

Orbital characteristics
- Epoch 21 November 2025 (JD 2461000.5)
- Uncertainty parameter 6 · 5
- Observation arc: 30 days
- Aphelion: 4.6731 AU
- Perihelion: 0.8407 AU
- Semi-major axis: 2.7569 AU
- Eccentricity: 0.6951
- Orbital period (sidereal): 4.58 yr (1,672 d)
- Mean anomaly: 210.27°
- Mean motion: 0° 12^{m} 55.08^{s} / day
- Inclination: 8.3879°
- Longitude of ascending node: 213.54°
- Argument of perihelion: 233.99°
- Earth MOID: 0.0063 AU (2.45 LD) (942000 km)
- Jupiter MOID: 0.8195 AU
- T_{Jupiter}: 2.9230

Physical characteristics
- Mean diameter: 0.13 km (est. at 0.20); 0.24 km (est. at 0.057)
- Absolute magnitude (H): 21.8

2004 TN_{1} is a sub-kilometer near-Earth asteroid and potentially hazardous object of the Apollo group, approximately 180 meters (600 ft) in diameter. It was first observed by the Near-Earth Asteroid Tracking at Palomar Observatory on 5 October 2004. The asteroid has a notably low sub-lunar Earth-MOID of 0.38 LD. As of 2026, it has only been observed in Fall 2004.

== Orbit and classification ==
2004 TN_{1} is a member of the Apollo group of asteroids, which are Earth-crossing asteroids. They are the largest group of near-Earth objects with approximately 10 thousand known members. It orbits the Sun at a distance of 0.8–4.7 AU once every 4 years and 7 months (1,664 days; semi-major axis of 2.75 AU). Its orbit has an eccentricity of 0.70 and an inclination of 8° with respect to the ecliptic. Due to its highly eccentric orbit it also crosses the orbit of Mars at 1.66 AU. The body's observation arc begins with its first observation at Palomar on 5 October 2004.

However, its orbit is poorly determined, with observations taken over a few weeks in 2004, yielding an orbital certainty of 5 and 6, respectively, with 0 being a well-determined orbit and 9 being an extremely poorly determined orbit. More observations are needed to improve the precision of the asteroid's orbital parameters to determine its potentially hazard it may pose to Earth in the distant future.

=== Close approaches ===
The asteroid has an Earth minimum orbital intersection distance of 0.00100677 AU (151,000 km; 93,600 mi), which corresponds to 0.38 lunar distances and makes it a potentially hazardous asteroid due to its sufficiently large size. On 24 November 2004, it passed Earth at a nominal distance of 0.0935379 AU (14,000,000 km; 8,690,000 mi). It has the fourth smallest geocentric Minimum Orbital Intersection Distance of any asteroid, after 2008 TC3 which exploded in Earth's atmosphere in 2008, 1994 GV, and 2014 AA which also impacted the Earth in 2014. The asteroid, however, will not make any significant close approaches to Earth in at least the next century, as it is expected to pass close to Earth again on 8 October 2114.

== Numbering and naming ==
This minor planet has neither been numbered nor named by the Minor Planet Center, which requires repeated observations on more than one opposition.

== Physical characteristics ==
2004 TN_{1} has an unknown spectral type and could be of siliceous (S-type) or carbonaceous (C-type) composition with high or low albedo, respectively.

=== Rotation period ===
As of 2019, no rotational lightcurve of this asteroid has been obtained from photometric observations. The body's rotation period, pole and shape remain unknown.

=== Diameter and albedo ===
Based on a magnitude-to-diameter conversion and a measured absolute magnitude of 21.8, 2004 TN_{1} measures between 130 and 240 meters in diameter for an assumed geometric albedo of 0.20 (siliceous) and 0.057 (carbonaceous), respectively. A theoretical impact into porous rock at 45°, assuming the asteroid to have a density of 2 g/cm^{3}, would yield a crater between 1.7 and 3.2 kilometers wide, slightly larger than Meteor Crater in Arizona.
