= List of unnumbered minor planets: 2004 F =

This is a partial list of unnumbered minor planets for principal provisional designations assigned during 16–31 March 2004. As of April 2026, a total of 95 bodies remain unnumbered for this period. Objects for this year are listed on the following pages: A–B · C · D–E · F · G–H · J–O · P–Q · R_{i} · R_{ii} · R_{iii} · S · T_{i} · T_{ii} · T_{iii} · T_{iv} · U–V · W–X and Y. Also see previous and next year.

Near-Earth obj.	MBA (inner)	MBA (outer)	Centaur
Mars-crosser	MBA (middle)	Jupiter trojan	Trans-Neptunian obj.
Unclassified

== F ==
U	Designation	Class	Physical		Observations				Description and notes	Ref
U	Designation	Class	H	D	Opp.	Arc	Last	Used	Description and notes	Ref
5	2004 FA	APO	23.2	81 m	single	10 days	25 Mar 2004	132	Disc.: Spacewatch	MPC · JPL
1	2004 FB	MCA	19.6	670 m	multiple	2004–2018	16 May 2018	96	Disc.: CSS	MPC · JPL
–	2004 FC	MCA	21.8	130 m	single	28 days	13 Apr 2004	23	Disc.: Spacewatch	MPC · JPL
2	2004 FD	APO	22.9	93 m	multiple	2004–2007	11 Mar 2007	43	Disc.: Spacewatch	MPC · JPL
0	2004 FE	AMO	21.85	150 m	multiple	2004-2022	02 Mar 2022	70	Disc.: LINEAR	MPC · JPL
0	2004 FH	ATE	25.7	26 m	multiple	2004–2018	16 Jan 2018	251	Disc.: LINEAR	MPC · JPL
0	2004 FC1	MBA-I	18.4	620 m	multiple	2005–2020	12 Jul 2020	28	Disc.: VATT	MPC · JPL
0	2004 FW1	APO	20.9	230 m	multiple	2004–2018	10 Dec 2018	121	Disc.: LINEAR; Potentially hazardous object Alt.: 2016 UD57	MPC · JPL
8	2004 FX1	APO	25.3	31 m	single	2 days	19 Mar 2004	28	Disc.: LINEAR	MPC · JPL
6	2004 FY1	APO	26.3	20 m	single	2 days	19 Mar 2004	19	Disc.: LINEAR	MPC · JPL
0	2004 FK2	AMO	24.38	49 m	multiple	2004-2024	08 Mar 2024	76	Disc.: LINEAR	MPC · JPL
–	2004 FV2	MBA-I	18.4	620 m	single	9 days	27 Mar 2004	18	Disc.: LINEAR	MPC · JPL
7	2004 FY3	APO	25.4	30 m	single	11 days	30 Mar 2004	27	Disc.: LINEAR	MPC · JPL
1	2004 FD4	AMO	21.1	210 m	multiple	2004–2020	14 Oct 2020	36	Disc.: LPL/Spacewatch II	MPC · JPL
8	2004 FE4	AMO	23.3	78 m	single	11 days	30 Mar 2004	38	Disc.: LINEAR	MPC · JPL
8	2004 FM4	APO	25.1	34 m	single	12 days	31 Mar 2004	26	Disc.: LINEAR	MPC · JPL
4	2004 FP4	AMO	23.1	85 m	single	121 days	19 Jul 2004	71	Disc.: LINEAR	MPC · JPL
7	2004 FA5	APO	24.5	45 m	single	5 days	24 Mar 2004	24	Disc.: LINEAR	MPC · JPL
6	2004 FK5	APO	26.8	16 m	single	3 days	25 Mar 2004	17	Disc.: LINEAR; AMO at MPC	MPC · JPL
0	2004 FZ5	AMO	20.05	350 m	multiple	2004–2023	18 Mar 2023	86	Disc.: LINEAR	MPC · JPL
0	2004 FS6	MCA	18.74	750 m	multiple	2004–2021	08 Apr 2021	27	Disc.: LPL/Spacewatch II; Added on 11 May 2021	MPC · JPL
0	2004 FY6	MBA-I	18.9	490 m	multiple	2004–2018	20 Jan 2018	34	Disc.: LPL/Spacewatch II; Alt.: 2015 KR63	MPC · JPL
3	2004 FL7	MBA-I	19.4	390 m	multiple	2004–2020	15 Oct 2020	23	Disc.: LPL/Spacewatch II	MPC · JPL
2	2004 FM8	HUN	18.4	620 m	multiple	2004–2020	15 Sep 2020	27	Disc.: Spacewatch; Alt.: 2015 VZ48	MPC · JPL
6	2004 FN8	APO	27.1	14 m	single	6 days	29 Mar 2004	27	Disc.: LINEAR	MPC · JPL
0	2004 FQ9	HIL	16.5	2.8 km	multiple	2004–2021	09 May 2021	28	Disc.: LPL/Spacewatch II; Added on 19 October 2020	MPC · JPL
1	2004 FR9	MBA-M	18.8	520 m	multiple	2004–2016	28 Mar 2016	25	Disc.: LPL/Spacewatch II; Added on 22 July 2020	MPC · JPL
0	2004 FY9	MBA-M	18.47	850 m	multiple	2004–2021	06 Apr 2021	69	Disc.: CINEOS; Alt.: 2017 FZ99	MPC · JPL
0	2004 FJ11	APO	21.03	220 m	multiple	2004–2021	30 Sep 2021	171	Disc.: LINEAR; Potentially hazardous object	MPC · JPL
6	2004 FY15	APO	26.1	21 m	single	1 day	27 Mar 2004	28	Disc.: CSS	MPC · JPL
8	2004 FB16	AMO	25.5	28 m	single	7 days	30 Mar 2004	21	Disc.: LINEAR	MPC · JPL
0	2004 FP16	MBA-I	18.98	410 m	multiple	2004–2025	20 Mar 2025	59	Disc.: Mauna Kea Obs.	MPC · JPL
0	2004 FS16	MBA-M	18.81	510 m	multiple	2004–2021	13 Jul 2021	29	Disc.: Mauna Kea Obs. Added on 21 August 2021; Alt.: 2021 LJ8	MPC · JPL
2	2004 FN17	AMO	21.0	220 m	multiple	2004–2006	29 Jan 2006	71	Disc.: LINEAR	MPC · JPL
0	2004 FW17	MCA	19.14	450 m	multiple	2004-2023	01 Apr 2023	54	Disc.: LINEAR	MPC · JPL
6	2004 FB18	AMO	24.0	56 m	single	57 days	24 May 2004	72	Disc.: LINEAR	MPC · JPL
0	2004 FC18	APO	24.17	47 m	multiple	2004-2025	28 Mar 2025	77	Disc.: Spacewatch	MPC · JPL
0	2004 FQ18	MBA-I	19.28	410 m	multiple	2004–2019	08 May 2019	40	Disc.: Kitt Peak	MPC · JPL
2	2004 FU18	MBA-O	17.6	1.7 km	multiple	2004–2020	24 Mar 2020	30	Disc.: Kitt Peak; Added on 22 July 2020	MPC · JPL
0	2004 FC29	MCA	19.49	800 m	multiple	2004–2016	11 Apr 2015	102	Disc.: Spacewatch	MPC · JPL
8	2004 FG29	ATE	26.0	22 m	single	2 days	31 Mar 2004	45	Disc.: LINEAR	MPC · JPL
4	2004 FH29	APO	24.0	56 m	single	11 days	09 Apr 2004	56	Disc.: SSS	MPC · JPL
1	2004 FS29	MBA-I	18.66	260 m	multiple	2004-2025	01 May 2025	33	Disc.: Berg. Gladbach	MPC · JPL
0	2004 FL30	HUN	18.1	710 m	multiple	2004–2019	25 Jan 2019	65	Disc.: LINEAR	MPC · JPL
9	2004 FJ31	APO	24.4	47 m	single	2 days	31 Mar 2004	24	Disc.: LINEAR	MPC · JPL
7	2004 FY31	APO	21.9	150 m	single	57 days	14 Apr 2004	56	Disc.: LONEOS; Potentially hazardous object	MPC · JPL
6	2004 FM32	APO	27.1	14 m	single	15 days	14 Apr 2004	35	Disc.: LINEAR	MPC · JPL
0	2004 FE57	MBA-I	19.15	390 m	multiple	2004-2023	21 Apr 2023	29	Disc.: Spacewatch	MPC · JPL
2	2004 FL57	MBA-I	18.8	520 m	multiple	2004–2019	26 Apr 2019	31	Disc.: Spacewatch; Alt.: 2015 ED22	MPC · JPL
–	2004 FT58	MCA	20.2	510 m	single	6 days	23 Mar 2004	9	Disc.: Spacewatch	MPC · JPL
0	2004 FA59	MBA-M	18.1	1.0 km	multiple	2004–2017	29 Mar 2017	21	Disc.: Spacewatch; Added on 24 December 2021	MPC · JPL
0	2004 FY68	MBA-I	18.6	570 m	multiple	2004–2019	25 Apr 2019	41	Disc.: Spacewatch; Alt.: 2015 BO470	MPC · JPL
1	2004 FO73	MBA-M	18.83	720 m	multiple	2004–2021	31 Mar 2021	36	Disc.: Spacewatch	MPC · JPL
1	2004 FK74	MBA-I	19.3	410 m	multiple	2004–2018	23 Jan 2018	24	Disc.: Spacewatch; Added on 21 August 2021	MPC · JPL
0	2004 FE78	MBA-M	18.2	960 m	multiple	2004–2021	15 Apr 2021	40	Disc.: LPL/Spacewatch II; Added on 5 November 2021; Alt.: 2008 DG7, 2017 HH15	MPC · JPL
0	2004 FJ78	MBA-M	17.46	1.6 km	multiple	2004-2023	17 Jun 2023	50	Disc.: LPL/Spacewatch II	MPC · JPL
–	2004 FQ78	MBA-O	19.3	770 m	single	7 days	26 Mar 2004	9	Disc.: LPL/Spacewatch II	MPC · JPL
2	2004 FY78	MBA-I	18.7	540 m	multiple	2004–2019	02 Jun 2019	27	Disc.: LPL/Spacewatch II	MPC · JPL
–	2004 FE79	MBA-O	17.5	1.8 km	single	10 days	29 Mar 2004	9	Disc.: LPL/Spacewatch II	MPC · JPL
0	2004 FW98	MBA-I	18.46	600 m	multiple	2004–2021	11 Oct 2021	34	Disc.: LPL/Spacewatch II	MPC · JPL
0	2004 FM100	HUN	19.4	390 m	multiple	2004–2018	02 Oct 2018	31	Disc.: LPL/Spacewatch II	MPC · JPL
3	2004 FL103	MBA-M	18.66	550 m	multiple	2004–2017	30 Jul 2017	27	Disc.: Spacewatch	MPC · JPL
2	2004 FY114	MBA-I	18.7	540 m	multiple	2004–2018	16 Mar 2018	35	Disc.: Spacewatch	MPC · JPL
2	2004 FD119	MBA-I	18.61	560 m	multiple	2004–2021	09 Aug 2021	23	Disc.: Spacewatch	MPC · JPL
0	2004 FU119	MBA-I	18.9	490 m	multiple	2004–2018	15 Jan 2018	19	Disc.: LPL/Spacewatch II	MPC · JPL
0	2004 FH127	MBA-M	18.51	680 m	multiple	2004-2025	21 Apr 2025	44	Disc.: LINEAR	MPC · JPL
3	2004 FM127	MBA-I	18.7	540 m	multiple	2004–2021	22 Apr 2021	19	Disc.: LINEAR; Added on 17 June 2021; Alt.: 2021 GS45	MPC · JPL
1	2004 FP132	MBA-I	18.9	490 m	multiple	2004–2019	03 Apr 2019	29	Disc.: Spacewatch; Alt.: 2015 BN132	MPC · JPL
2	2004 FA142	MBA-I	18.9	490 m	multiple	2004–2011	05 Mar 2011	25	Disc.: LINEAR; Alt.: 2011 DE16	MPC · JPL
9	2004 FP146	MCA	21.1	340 m	single	9 days	09 Apr 2004	8	Disc.: LPL/Spacewatch II	MPC · JPL
1	2004 FP152	MBA-I	19.0	470 m	multiple	2004–2019	09 Apr 2019	25	Disc.: Spacewatch	MPC · JPL
9	2004 FU162	ATE	28.7	7 m	single	0 day	31 Mar 2004	4	Disc.: LINEAR	MPC · JPL
4	2004 FW164	TNO	8.1	113 km	multiple	2004–2019	06 May 2019	28	Disc.: Mauna Kea Obs. LoUTNOs, plutino	MPC · JPL
0	2004 FR169	MBA-I	18.6	570 m	multiple	2004–2018	16 May 2018	74	Disc.: LPL/Spacewatch II; Alt.: 2016 UJ175	MPC · JPL
2	2004 FM170	MBA-M	18.1	710 m	multiple	2004–2020	21 Apr 2020	65	Disc.: Spacewatch	MPC · JPL
0	2004 FU170	MBA-I	18.6	570 m	multiple	2004–2015	21 Apr 2015	32	Disc.: Spacewatch	MPC · JPL
0	2004 FA171	MBA-M	17.2	1.5 km	multiple	2004–2020	23 Dec 2020	40	Disc.: Spacewatch	MPC · JPL
0	2004 FS171	MBA-I	18.9	490 m	multiple	2004–2018	19 Mar 2018	33	Disc.: Spacewatch	MPC · JPL
2	2004 FW171	MBA-M	18.3	650 m	multiple	2004–2016	04 Feb 2016	29	Disc.: Spacewatch	MPC · JPL
0	2004 FC172	MBA-I	18.9	490 m	multiple	2004–2018	26 Jan 2018	33	Disc.: LPL/Spacewatch II	MPC · JPL
0	2004 FD172	MBA-I	18.68	550 m	multiple	2004–2021	11 Nov 2021	32	Disc.: LPL/Spacewatch II	MPC · JPL
0	2004 FF172	HUN	18.93	490 m	multiple	2004–2021	09 Sep 2021	30	Disc.: Spacewatch	MPC · JPL
0	2004 FG172	MBA-I	18.8	520 m	multiple	2004–2018	23 Jan 2018	28	Disc.: Spacewatch	MPC · JPL
0	2004 FK172	HUN	18.9	490 m	multiple	2004–2020	14 Jan 2020	31	Disc.: SDSS	MPC · JPL
0	2004 FE173	MBA-I	18.6	570 m	multiple	2004–2019	27 May 2019	58	Disc.: Spacewatch	MPC · JPL
0	2004 FJ174	MBA-M	17.6	1.7 km	multiple	2004–2019	26 Nov 2019	39	Disc.: LPL/Spacewatch II	MPC · JPL
1	2004 FB175	MBA-I	18.6	570 m	multiple	2004–2018	12 Jul 2018	33	Disc.: Spacewatch	MPC · JPL
0	2004 FE175	MBA-I	18.9	490 m	multiple	2004–2021	18 Jan 2021	42	Disc.: Spacewatch	MPC · JPL
0	2004 FH175	HUN	18.5	590 m	multiple	2004–2018	19 Nov 2018	29	Disc.: Spacewatch	MPC · JPL
0	2004 FE176	MBA-I	18.4	620 m	multiple	2004–2019	08 Feb 2019	38	Disc.: Spacewatch	MPC · JPL
1	2004 FK176	MBA-I	19.1	450 m	multiple	2004–2019	01 Jun 2019	33	Disc.: Spacewatch	MPC · JPL
0	2004 FN176	MBA-I	18.6	570 m	multiple	2004–2019	05 Aug 2019	40	Disc.: LPL/Spacewatch II	MPC · JPL
2	2004 FE177	MBA-I	18.2	680 m	multiple	2004–2019	27 Oct 2019	49	Disc.: Spacewatch	MPC · JPL
0	2004 FX177	MBA-M	18.30	1.2 km	multiple	2004–2021	02 Dec 2021	33	Disc.: Spacewatch; Added on 17 January 2021	MPC · JPL
1	2004 FD178	MBA-O	17.3	1.9 km	multiple	2004–2021	08 May 2021	64	Disc.: SDSS; Added on 11 May 2021; Alt.: 2010 BE113	MPC · JPL

back to top
