= List of unnumbered minor planets: 2004 W–X =

This is a partial list of unnumbered minor planets for principal provisional designations assigned between 16 November and 15 December 2004. As of March 2026, a total of 109 bodies remain unnumbered for this period. Objects for this year are listed on the following pages: A–B · C · D–E · F · G–H · J–O · P–Q · R_{i} · R_{ii} · R_{iii} · S · T_{i} · T_{ii} · T_{iii} · T_{iv} · U–V · W–X and Y. Also see previous and next year.

Near-Earth obj.	MBA (inner)	MBA (outer)	Centaur
Mars-crosser	MBA (middle)	Jupiter trojan	Trans-Neptunian obj.
Unclassified

== W ==
U	Designation	Class	Physical		Observations				Description and notes	Ref
U	Designation	Class	H	D	Opp.	Arc	Last	Used	Description and notes	Ref
7	2004 WC1	ATE	26.1	21 m	single	4 days	22 Nov 2004	14	Disc.: LONEOS	MPC; JPL
0	2004 WH1	APO	24.04	56 m	multiple	2004-2026	16 Apr 2026	50	Disc.: LONEOS	MPC; JPL
0	2004 WK1	APO	21.10	210 m	multiple	2004–2021	27 Nov 2021	44	Disc.: LINEAR; Potentially hazardous object	MPC; JPL
0	2004 WA2	MBA-O	17.43	1.8 km	multiple	2004–2021	01 Dec 2021	55	Disc.: CINEOS; Alt.: 2015 UK58	MPC; JPL
1	2004 WL5	MBA-M	18.9	920 m	multiple	2004–2013	07 Dec 2013	20	Disc.: Spacewatch	MPC; JPL
0	2004 WX11	MBA-M	18.0	1.4 km	multiple	2004–2019	07 Jan 2019	57	Disc.: CINEOS; Alt.: 2018 XY14	MPC; JPL
2	2004 WM13	MBA-M	18.9	490 m	multiple	2004–2020	16 Aug 2020	50	Disc.: CINEOS	MPC; JPL
0	2004 WR13	MBA-M	17.8	1.2 km	multiple	2004–2019	27 May 2019	51	Disc.: Spacewatch	MPC; JPL
1	2004 WU13	MBA-O	17.1	2.1 km	multiple	2004–2019	19 Dec 2019	54	Disc.: Spacewatch	MPC; JPL
1	2004 WB14	HUN	20.3	260 m	multiple	2004–2020	01 Jan 2020	41	Disc.: Spacewatch	MPC; JPL
1	2004 WN14	MBA-I	18.73	530 m	multiple	2004–2022	06 Jan 2022	28	Disc.: Spacewatch; Added on 24 December 2021	MPC; JPL

back to top

== X ==
U	Designation	Class	Physical		Observations				Description and notes	Ref
U	Designation	Class	H	D	Opp.	Arc	Last	Used	Description and notes	Ref
0	2004 XG	ATE	24.1	54 m	multiple	2004–2015	11 Jan 2015	86	Disc.: CSS	MPC; JPL
7	2004 XJ	ATE	24.0	56 m	single	14 days	15 Dec 2004	75	Disc.: LINEAR	MPC; JPL
7	2004 XK	APO	26.0	22 m	single	3 days	04 Dec 2004	47	Disc.: CSS	MPC; JPL
0	2004 XN	MCA	18.5	1.1 km	multiple	2004–2014	04 Jan 2014	45	Disc.: LONEOS; Alt.: 2013 WK44	MPC; JPL
0	2004 XO	APO	21.62	170 m	multiple	2004-2023	15 Nov 2023	101	Disc.: CSS; Potentially hazardous object	MPC; JPL
5	2004 XH3	APO	24.1	54 m	single	6 days	07 Dec 2004	24	Disc.: LINEAR	MPC; JPL
0	2004 XK3	APO	24.4	47 m	multiple	2004–2008	06 Dec 2008	229	Disc.: LONEOS	MPC; JPL
7	2004 XL4	AMO	20.9	230 m	single	40 days	15 Jan 2005	44	Disc.: LINEAR	MPC; JPL
0	2004 XD6	APO	22.16	120 m	multiple	2004-2023	17 Decn 2023	75	Disc.: Spacewatch	MPC; JPL
0	2004 XE6	AMO	19.5	450 m	multiple	2004–2018	27 May 2018	138	Disc.: LINEAR	MPC; JPL
0	2004 XV12	MBA-M	17.41	1.4 km	multiple	2004–2021	02 Oct 2021	62	Disc.: LINEAR	MPC; JPL
1	2004 XJ14	MCA	20.61	250 m	multiple	2004-2022	04 Feb 2022	74	Disc.: LINEAR	MPC; JPL
0	2004 XK14	ATE	22.4	240 m	multiple	2004–2017	23 Nov 2017	137	Disc.: LINEAR	MPC; JPL
5	2004 XG29	APO	25.3	31 m	single	36 days	15 Jan 2005	110	Disc.: LINEAR	MPC; JPL
0	2004 XJ29	APO	21.38	190 m	multiple	2004–2022	26 Jan 2022	226	Disc.: CSS	MPC; JPL
0	2004 XK29	APO	19.7	410 m	multiple	2004–2020	31 Jan 2020	135	Disc.: CSS	MPC; JPL
1	2004 XM29	APO	22.9	93 m	multiple	2004–2008	01 Jun 2008	134	Disc.: Spacewatch	MPC; JPL
9	2004 XN29	APO	22.0	140 m	single	27 days	07 Jan 2005	64	Disc.: CSS; Potentially hazardous object	MPC; JPL
1	2004 XO29	APO	21.1	210 m	multiple	2004–2019	19 Dec 2019	59	Disc.: Spacewatch	MPC; JPL
1	2004 XP29	MCA	17.8	820 m	multiple	2001–2020	28 Jun 2020	64	Disc.: CSS	MPC; JPL
0	2004 XF35	MCA	19.22	730 m	multiple	2004-2022	21 Feb 2022	85	Disc.: LINEAR	MPC; JPL
E	2004 XH35	MCA	19.3	410 m	single	1 day	13 Dec 2004	13	Disc.: LINEAR	MPC; JPL
2	2004 XJ35	AMO	20.3	310 m	multiple	2004–2007	16 Dec 2007	86	Disc.: Spacewatch	MPC; JPL
7	2004 XO35	AMO	21.8	160 m	single	19 days	31 Dec 2004	25	Disc.: LINEAR	MPC; JPL
6	2004 XP35	APO	23.4	74 m	single	22 days	02			
0	2004 XG37	MBA-I	18.3	650 m	multiple	2004–2019	28 Dec 2019	77	Disc.: CINEOS	MPC; JPL
2	2004 XL44	MCA	19.68	430 m	multiple	2004-2021	11 Aug 2021	22	Disc.: Mauna Kea Obs.	MPC; JPL
E	2004 XM44	MCA	19.8	330 m	single	2 days	14 Dec 2004	9	Disc.: Mauna Kea Obs.	MPC; JPL
1	2004 XX44	MCA	19.46	400 m	multiple	2004-2023	06 Dec 2023	34	Disc.: Mauna Kea Obs.	MPC; JPL
4	2004 XZ44	MCA	18.8	520 m	multiple	2004–2020	21 Apr 2020	33	Disc.: Mauna Kea Obs. Alt.: 2020 FQ5	MPC; JPL
0	2004 XA45	APO	21.0	220 m	multiple	2004–2008	22 Oct 2008	44	Disc.: Mauna Kea Obs.	MPC; JPL
5	2004 XB45	APO	26.2	20 m	single	4 days	16 Dec 2004	45	Disc.: Spacewatch	MPC; JPL
1	2004 XR45	MBA-M	17.5	940 m	multiple	2004–2021	11 Jan 2021	50	Disc.: Spacewatch; Added on 9 March 2021	MPC; JPL
0	2004 XH50	MBA-O	16.5	2.8 km	multiple	2004–2017	03 Jan 2017	85	Disc.: CINEOS; MCA at MPC	MPC; JPL
0	2004 XJ50	AMO	19.27	500 m	multiple	2004–2022	27 Jan 2022	86	Disc.: LONEOS	MPC; JPL
0	2004 XC51	APO	19.86	370 m	multiple	2004-2026	10 Nov 2026	60	Disc.: LINEAR	MPC; JPL
7	2004 XD51	APO	25.0	36 m	single	5 days	19 Dec 2004	33	Disc.: LINEAR	MPC; JPL
2	2004 XS53	MBA-O	17.0	2.2 km	multiple	2004–2021	04 Jan 2021	40	Disc.: Spacewatch; Added on 17 June 2021; Alt.: 2010 BG127, 2020 WU9	MPC; JPL
1	2004 XL58	MBA-M	17.39	1.4 km	multiple	2004–2022	27 Jan 2022	41	Disc.: Spacewatch	MPC; JPL
0	2004 XD60	MBA-O	17.21	2.0 km	multiple	2004–2022	24 Jan 2022	45	Disc.: Spacewatch; Added on 29 January 2022	MPC; JPL
0	2004 XP61	MCA	17.42	1.4 km	multiple	2004–2021	16 Nov 2021	31	Disc.: Spacewatch; Added on 9 March 2021; Alt.: 2020 MG1	MPC; JPL
5	2004 XO63	APO	26.2	20 m	single	6 days	21 Dec 2004	37	Disc.: LINEAR	MPC; JPL
0	2004 XF73	MBA-I	17.57	910 m	multiple	2004–2021	30 Jun 2021	46	Disc.: NEAT	MPC; JPL
0	2004 XN76	MBA-O	16.8	2.4 km	multiple	2004–2020	22 Jun 2020	71	Disc.: Spacewatch; Alt.: 2016 AV188	MPC; JPL
2	2004 XB82	MBA-M	19.0	520 m	multiple	2001-2012	10 Oct 2012	27	Disc.: CINEOS	MPC; JPL
0	2004 XR82	MBA-I	17.0	1.2 km	multiple	2004–2019	30 Dec 2019	55	Disc.: Spacewatch; Alt.: 2015 XK308	MPC; JPL
1	2004 XC87	MBA-O	17.8	1.5 km	multiple	2004–2021	11 Jan 2021	75	Disc.: CSS; Alt.: 2020 SA11	MPC; JPL
1	2004 XP118	MBA-M	18.3	650 m	multiple	2004–2020	11 Nov 2020	31	Disc.: Spacewatch; Added on 29 January 2022	MPC; JPL
3	2004 XF131	MBA-I	18.8	520 m	multiple	2004–2018	31 Dec 2018	17	Disc.: Spacewatch	MPC; JPL
1	2004 XW137	MBA-M	17.8	1.5 km	multiple	2004–2019	04 Mar 2019	32	Disc.: Spacewatch	MPC; JPL
0	2004 XY141	MBA-M	18.63	790 m	multiple	2004–2021	31 Aug 2021	31	Disc.: Spacewatch	MPC; JPL
1	2004 XY144	MBA-M	17.6	900 m	multiple	2004–2020	05 Dec 2020	54	Disc.: Spacewatch; Added on 17 January 2021	MPC; JPL
0	2004 XQ150	MBA-I	18.80	520 m	multiple	2004–2021	10 Aug 2021	45	Disc.: Spacewatch	MPC; JPL
0	2004 XO151	MBA-M	19.2	430 m	multiple	2004–2020	11 Dec 2020	57	Disc.: Spacewatch	MPC; JPL
1	2004 XR152	MBA-I	18.6	570 m	multiple	2004–2017	27 Mar 2017	38	Disc.: Spacewatch; Added on 22 July 2020	MPC; JPL
1	2004 XQ154	MBA-M	18.3	650 m	multiple	2004–2020	14 Dec 2020	33	Disc.: Spacewatch; Added on 17 January 2021	MPC; JPL
0	2004 XV155	MBA-O	17.4	1.8 km	multiple	2004–2021	07 Jan 2021	34	Disc.: Spacewatch; Added on 19 October 2020	MPC; JPL
0	2004 XX157	MBA-M	18.02	1.0 km	multiple	2004–2021	08 Dec 2021	44	Disc.: Spacewatch	MPC; JPL
0	2004 XN158	MBA-I	18.86	500 m	multiple	2004–2021	04 Oct 2021	39	Disc.: Spacewatch; Alt.: 2009 HC53	MPC; JPL
0	2004 XB159	MBA-M	18.6	800 m	multiple	2004–2022	08 Jan 2022	18	Disc.: Spacewatch; Added on 29 January 2022	MPC; JPL
0	2004 XO160	MBA-O	17.1	2.1 km	multiple	2004–2021	05 Jan 2021	69	Disc.: Spacewatch; Alt.: 2010 CB215	MPC; JPL
0	2004 XP165	MBA-O	17.19	2.0 km	multiple	2004–2022	25 Jan 2022	118	Disc.: LINEAR; Added on 9 March 2021; Alt.: 2020 QG10	MPC; JPL
0	2004 XG175	MBA-I	18.9	490 m	multiple	2004–2018	03 Oct 2018	38	Disc.: Spacewatch	MPC; JPL
0	2004 XN175	MBA-O	18.0	1.4 km	multiple	2003–2021	17 Jan 2021	35	Disc.: Spacewatch; Added on 22 July 2020	MPC; JPL
0	2004 XA181	MBA-O	17.02	2.2 km	multiple	2004–2022	25 Jan 2022	46	Disc.: CINEOS; Alt.: 2010 CY210	MPC; JPL
0	2004 XZ185	MCA	19.3	770 m	multiple	2004–2019	03 Jan 2019	38	Disc.: CSS; Alt.: 2018 VM67	MPC; JPL
2	2004 XM186	MCA	19.6	510 m	multiple	2004–2021	04 Oct 2021	37	Disc.: Spacewatch; Added on 30 September 2021	MPC; JPL
E	2004 XW186	TNO	8.7	62 km	single	2 days	14 Dec 2004	3	Disc.: Mauna Kea Obs. LoUTNOs, cubewano?	MPC; JPL
E	2004 XX186	TNO	8.6	65 km	single	2 days	14 Dec 2004	3	Disc.: Mauna Kea Obs. LoUTNOs, cubewano?	MPC; JPL
9	2004 XY186	TNO	9.8	52 km	single	2 days	14 Dec 2004	3	Disc.: Mauna Kea Obs. LoUTNOs, plutino?	MPC; JPL
9	2004 XZ186	TNO	10.0	47 km	single	2 days	14 Dec 2004	3	Disc.: Mauna Kea Obs. LoUTNOs, plutino?	MPC; JPL
0	2004 XP187	MBA-M	18.3	920 m	multiple	2004–2020	16 Jun 2020	43	Disc.: Mauna Kea Obs.	MPC; JPL
0	2004 XV187	MBA-O	17.17	2.0 km	multiple	2004–2021	09 Dec 2021	115	Disc.: Mauna Kea Obs.	MPC; JPL
0	2004 XA188	MBA-M	18.4	620 m	multiple	2004–2020	15 Oct 2020	32	— Added on 22 July 2020; Alt.: 2012 UD99	MPC; JPL
0	2004 XG188	MBA-O	17.8	1.5 km	multiple	2004–2020	16 Nov 2020	49	Disc.: Mauna Kea Obs. Added on 17 January 2021	MPC; JPL
0	2004 XM188	MBA-O	17.3	1.9 km	multiple	1998–2020	09 Dec 2020	89	Disc.: SDSS; Alt.: 1998 SP173, 2009 VX117, 2009 WJ35	MPC; JPL
1	2004 XQ188	MBA-M	18.68	770 m	multiple	2004–2021	31 Jul 2021	27	Disc.: Mauna Kea Obs.	MPC; JPL
1	2004 XZ188	MBA-O	17.34	1.9 km	multiple	2004–2021	08 Aug 2021	13	Disc.: Mauna Kea Obs. Added on 21 August 2021	MPC; JPL
1	2004 XE189	MBA-I	19.1	450 m	multiple	2004–2020	25 May 2020	36	Disc.: Mauna Kea Obs. Added on 19 October 2020	MPC; JPL
0	2004 XA190	MBA-O	17.2	2.0 km	multiple	2004–2020	07 Dec 2020	34	Disc.: Mauna Kea Obs. Added on 11 May 2021; Alt.: 2019 SE170	MPC; JPL
0	2004 XM190	MBA-I	19.2	430 m	multiple	2004–2019	01 Jul 2019	24	Disc.: Mauna Kea Obs.	MPC; JPL
9	2004 XQ190	CEN	12.0	22 km	single	2 days	14 Dec 2004	4	Disc.: Mauna Kea Obs.	MPC; JPL
3	2004 XX190	TNO	6.90	139 km	multiple	2003–2020	09 Dec 2020	29	Disc.: Mauna Kea Obs. LoUTNOs, cubewano (cold)	MPC; JPL
0	2004 XC195	MBA-I	18.59	570 m	multiple	2004–2021	14 Jun 2021	55	Disc.: Spacewatch	MPC; JPL
0	2004 XH195	MBA-I	18.5	590 m	multiple	2004–2019	24 Dec 2019	54	Disc.: Spacewatch	MPC; JPL
0	2004 XE196	MCA	18.3	650 m	multiple	2004–2017	20 Nov 2017	33	Disc.: Spacewatch	MPC; JPL
0	2004 XG196	MBA-I	18.73	530 m	multiple	2004–2021	09 Nov 2021	40	Disc.: Spacewatch	MPC; JPL
0	2004 XY196	MBA-I	18.1	710 m	multiple	2004–2019	26 Nov 2019	46	Disc.: CINEOS	MPC; JPL
0	2004 XJ198	MBA-I	19.0	470 m	multiple	2004–2020	27 Jan 2020	29	Disc.: Spacewatch	MPC; JPL
0	2004 XO198	MBA-I	18.5	590 m	multiple	2004–2019	24 Aug 2019	29	Disc.: LPL/Spacewatch II	MPC; JPL
0	2004 XT198	MBA-I	18.7	540 m	multiple	2004–2020	02 Feb 2020	47	Disc.: Spacewatch	MPC; JPL
0	2004 XA199	MBA-I	18.7	540 m	multiple	1995–2020	23 Jan 2020	23	Disc.: Pan-STARRS; Added on 22 July 2020	MPC; JPL
1	2004 XB199	MBA-I	19.2	430 m	multiple	1999–2020	23 May 2020	36	Disc.: Spacewatch; Added on 22 July 2020	MPC; JPL
2	2004 XK199	MBA-M	18.3	1.2 km	multiple	1999–2014	07 Jan 2014	18	Disc.: Spacewatch; Added on 9 March 2021	MPC; JPL
0	2004 XL199	MBA-I	18.7	540 m	multiple	2004–2021	13 Apr 2021	32	Disc.: Pan-STARRS 1 Added on 17 June 2021	MPC; JPL
1	2004 XN199	MBA-O	17.62	1.7 km	multiple	2004–2021	18 Jan 2021	24	Disc.: Pan-STARRS 1 Added on 21 August 2021	MPC; JPL
0	2004 XO199	MBA-M	18.0	1.4 km	multiple	2004–2019	28 Jan 2019	33	Disc.: MLS; Added on 21 August 2021	MPC; JPL
1	2004 XV199	MBA-M	18.29	920 m	multiple	2004–2021	07 Aug 2021	22	Disc.: MLS; Added on 29 January 2022	MPC; JPL

back to top
