= List of unnumbered minor planets: 2004 P–Q =

This is a partial list of unnumbered minor planets for principal provisional designations assigned during 1–31 August 2004. As of April 2026, a total of 181 bodies remain unnumbered for this period. Objects for this year are listed on the following pages: A–B · C · D–E · F · G–H · J–O · P–Q · R_{i} · R_{ii} · R_{iii} · S · T_{i} · T_{ii} · T_{iii} · T_{iv} · U–V · W–X and Y. Also see previous and next year.

Near-Earth obj.	MBA (inner)	MBA (outer)	Centaur
Mars-crosser	MBA (middle)	Jupiter trojan	Trans-Neptunian obj.
Unclassified

== P ==
U	Designation	Class	Physical		Observations				Description and notes	Ref	
U	Designation	Class	H	D	Opp.	Arc	Last	Used	Description and notes	Ref	
4	2004 PJ	AMO	22.8	98 m	single	71 days	23 Aug 2004	110	—	MPC; JPL	
0	2004 PK	MCA	17.14	1.8 km	multiple	2004–2021	04 Oct 2021	163	—	MPC; JPL	
0	2004 PL1	MCA	18.76	530 m	multiple	2004–2021	08 May 2021	115	—	MPC; JPL	
0	2004 PK2	MCA	19.56	360 m	multiple	2004-2021	13 Sep 2021	61	—	MPC; JPL	
1	2004 PM2	AMO	19.3	490 m	multiple	2004–2012	22 Jun 2012	109	—	MPC; JPL	
1	2004 PO5	MBA-M	18.21	980 m	multiple	2004-2022	07 Jan 2022	29	—	MPC; JPL	
0	2004 PZ10	MBA-I	18.70	540 m	multiple	2004–2021	08 Sep 2021	43	Alt.: 2021 LL19	MPC; JPL	
1	2004 PL11	MBA-O	19.31	2.8 km	multiple	2004-2022	25 Dec 2022	34	—	MPC; JPL	
0	2004 PD14	MBA-M	17.3	1.5 km	multiple	2004–2018	15 Dec 2018	62	—	MPC; JPL	
6	2004 PZ19	APO	24.5	45 m	single	2 days	10 Aug 2004	95	—	MPC; JPL	
1	2004 PE20	AMO	20.1	340 m	multiple	2004–2014	21 Nov 2014	232	—	MPC; JPL	
6	2004 PF20	AMO	22.5	110 m	single	30 days	08 Sep 2004	67	—	MPC; JPL	
7	2004 PG20	AMO	24.5	45 m	single	32 days	09 Sep 2004	34	—	MPC; JPL	
–	2004 PK26	MCA	19.0	470 m	single	43 days	21 Sep 2004	44	—	MPC; JPL	
1	2004 PB27	MBA-O	18.04	1.7 km	multiple	2004-2022	08 Jun 2022	120	—	MPC; JPL	
1	2004 PY27	AMO	20.7	260 m	multiple	2004–2018	07 Jun 2018	33	—	MPC; JPL	
0	2004 PM30	HUN	18.5	590 m	multiple	2004–2020	06 Oct 2020	74	Disc.: LINEAR; Added on 13 September 2020	MPC; JPL	
–	2004 PR42	MCA	20.5	240 m	single	14 days	22 Aug 2004	53	—	MPC; JPL	
6	2004 PU42	APO	26.7	16 m	single	4 days	14 Aug 2004	64	—	MPC; JPL	
1	2004 PD59	MBA-M	18.1	1.0 km	multiple	2004–2017	24 Oct 2017	38	— Added on 22 July 2020; Alt.: 2017 NC4	MPC; JPL	
0	2004 PA60	MBA-M	17.92	1.1 km	multiple	2004–2021	09 Aug 2021	96	—	MPC; JPL	
0	2004 PD62	MBA-O	16.90	2.3 km	multiple	2004–2021	03 Oct 2021	89	— Added on 22 July 2020	MPC; JPL	
0	2004 PB66	MBA-O	17.81	1.8 km	multiple	2004-2026	22 Sep 2026	36	—	MPC; JPL	
9	2004 PR66	MBA-M	18.96	900 m	single	4 days	12 Aug 2004	11	Disc.: CINEOS; Added on 21 August 2021	MPC; JPL	
0	2004 PS66	MBA-I	17.9	780 m	multiple	2004–2020	23 Jan 2020	59	—	MPC; JPL	
0	2004 PD67	MCA	19.39	390 m	multiple	2004–2017	16 Nov 2017	125	—	MPC; JPL	
0	2004 PA80	MBA-O	17.43	1.8 km	multiple	2004–2021	31 Oct 2021	110	Alt.: 2021 PF4	MPC; JPL	
0	2004 PD86	MCA	18.7	540 m	multiple	2004–2020	23 Jun 2020	63	—	MPC; JPL	
0	2004 PO86	MBA-I	19.13	440 m	multiple	2004–2021	08 Nov 2021	56	Alt.: 2021 RR52	MPC; JPL	
0	2004 PF88	MBA-M	17.71	1.2 km	multiple	2004–2021	05 Oct 2021	146	—	MPC; JPL	
8	2004 PR92	APO	25.1	34 m	single	8 days	19 Aug 2004	49	—	MPC; JPL	
2	2004 PS92	AMO	18.9	590 m	multiple	2004–2012	09 May 2012	65	—	MPC; JPL	
1	2004 PO95	MBA-O	17.67	1.6 km	multiple	2004-2025	13 Sep 2025	26	—	MPC; JPL	
0	2004 PR96	MBA-M	18.09	1.0 km	multiple	2004–2021	24 Oct 2021	71	Disc.: CINEOS; Added on 21 August 2021	MPC; JPL	
6	2004 PB97	AMO	25.3	31 m	single	13 days	24 Aug 2004	20	—	MPC; JPL	
5	2004 PD97	AMO	21.6	170 m	single	58 days	09 Oct 2004	29	—	MPC; JPL	
0	2004 PE97	MCA	18.9	490 m	multiple	2004–2018	08 Aug 2018	100	—	MPC; JPL	
E	2004 PO100	MBA-M	18.3	650 m	single	21 days	01 Sep 2004	11	—	MPC; JPL	
1	2004 PY106	MBA-I	18.9	490 m	multiple	2004–2019	29 Nov 2019	24	— Added on 22 July 2020	MPC; JPL	
3	2004 PS107	TNO	7.6	126 km	multiple	2004–2014	29 Jul 2014	12	LoUTNOs, other TNO	MPC; JPL	
E	2004 PU107	TNO	6.7	157 km	single	29 days	11 Sep 2004	5	LoUTNOs, cubewano?	MPC; JPL	
E	2004 PV107	TNO	5.9	275 km	single	1 day	14 Aug 2004	3	LoUTNOs, other TNO	MPC; JPL	
3	2004 PX107	TNO	7.26	117 km	multiple	2003–2021	12 Sep 2021	20	LoUTNOs, cubewano (cold)	MPC; JPL	
5	2004 PZ107	TNO	7.67	100 km	multiple	2004–2021	09 Jul 2021	19	LoUTNOs, cubewano?	MPC; JPL; classical|cold]])	MPC; JPL
4	2004 PB108	TNO	6.50	243 km	multiple	2004–2021	12 Sep 2021	47	LoUTNOs, other TNO, albedo: 0.035; binary: 132 km	MPC; JPL	
2	2004 PX110	MBA-M	17.5	940 m	multiple	2004–2019	05 Feb 2019	34	—	MPC; JPL	
E	2004 PY111	TNO	6.6	164 km	single	32 days	13 Sep 2004	4	LoUTNOs, cubewano?	MPC; JPL	
E	2004 PZ111	TNO	7.1	130 km	single	32 days	13 Sep 2004	4	LoUTNOs, cubewano?	MPC; JPL	
E	2004 PC112	TNO	—	55 km	single	29 days	11 Sep 2004	4	LoUTNOs, cubewano?	MPC; JPL	
4	2004 PD112	TNO	6.29	180 km	multiple	2004-2011	03 Sep 2011	17	LoUTNOs, SDO	MPC; JPL	
E	2004 PE112	TNO	6.7	157 km	single	31 days	13 Sep 2004	4	LoUTNOs, cubewano?	MPC; JPL	
9	2004 PF112	TNO	6.7	157 km	single	30 days	13 Sep 2004	4	LoUTNOs, cubewano?	MPC; JPL	
1	2004 PV114	MBA-M	18.6	1.1 km	multiple	2004–2018	12 Oct 2018	29	—	MPC; JPL	
0	2004 PY114	MBA-O	17.16	2.1 km	multiple	2004–2021	05 Dec 2021	74	—	MPC; JPL	
0	2004 PJ116	MBA-M	18.71	540 m	multiple	2004–2021	04 Oct 2021	21	Disc.: Mauna Kea Obs. Added on 11 May 2021; Alt.: 2020 HY82	MPC; JPL	
0	2004 PO116	MBA-O	17.49	1.8 km	multiple	2004–2021	30 Nov 2021	52	Disc.: Mauna Kea; Added on 24 December 2021	MPC; JPL	
1	2004 PQ116	MBA-O	17.4	1.8 km	multiple	2004–2020	14 Sep 2020	42	—	MPC; JPL	
2	2004 PU116	MBA-O	17.8	1.5 km	multiple	2004–2021	18 Jan 2021	27	—	MPC; JPL	
0	2004 PX116	MBA-I	18.9	490 m	multiple	2003–2018	16 May 2018	32	—	MPC; JPL	
0	2004 PY116	MBA-O	17.4	1.8 km	multiple	2004–2020	16 Oct 2020	32	—	MPC; JPL	
4	2004 PT117	TNO	6.7	152 km	multiple	2004–2013	06 Oct 2013	19	LoUTNOs, cubewano (cold)	MPC; JPL	
4	2004 PU117	TNO	6.92	137 km	multiple	2004–2021	12 Sep 2021	20	LoUTNOs, cubewano (cold)	MPC; JPL	
4	2004 PV117	TNO	6.5	167 km	multiple	2004–2013	08 Jun 2013	29	LoUTNOs, cubewano (cold), binary: 89 km	MPC; JPL	
3	2004 PW117	TNO	6.35	178 km	multiple	2004–2021	09 Jul 2021	23	LoUTNOs, cubewano (cold), binary: 139 km	MPC; JPL	
4	2004 PX117	TNO	6.5	167 km	multiple	2004–2013	07 Oct 2013	17	LoUTNOs, cubewano (cold), binary: 139 km	MPC; JPL	
1	2004 PV118	MBA-I	18.6	570 m	multiple	2004–2020	05 Dec 2020	54	—	MPC; JPL	
0	2004 PM119	MBA-M	18.12	1.0 km	multiple	2004–2021	05 Jul 2021	30	—	MPC; JPL	
0	2004 PO119	MBA-M	17.91	1.1 km	multiple	2004–2021	08 Sep 2021	61	—	MPC; JPL	
0	2004 PS119	MBA-I	19.24	420 m	multiple	2004–2021	11 Nov 2021	41	—	MPC; JPL	
0	2004 PH120	MBA-I	18.7	540 m	multiple	2004–2019	10 Jun 2019	37	—	MPC; JPL	
0	2004 PK120	MBA-I	19.1	450 m	multiple	2004–2019	26 Nov 2019	36	—	MPC; JPL	
0	2004 PL120	MBA-I	19.13	440 m	multiple	2004–2021	02 Dec 2021	56	—	MPC; JPL	
1	2004 PN120	MBA-I	18.7	540 m	multiple	2004–2021	16 Jan 2021	51	—	MPC; JPL	
0	2004 PP120	MBA-I	18.6	570 m	multiple	2004–2019	22 Oct 2019	42	—	MPC; JPL	
0	2004 PQ120	MBA-M	17.5	1.8 km	multiple	2004–2019	05 Nov 2019	44	—	MPC; JPL	
0	2004 PT120	MBA-I	18.83	510 m	multiple	2004–2021	31 Oct 2021	65	—	MPC; JPL	
0	2004 PA121	MBA-O	17.2	2.0 km	multiple	2004–2019	09 May 2019	51	—	MPC; JPL	
0	2004 PB121	MBA-M	18.3	920 m	multiple	2004–2019	13 Jan 2019	41	—	MPC; JPL	
0	2004 PD121	MBA-I	18.9	490 m	multiple	2004–2019	03 Oct 2019	32	—	MPC; JPL	
2	2004 PE121	MBA-M	18.5	590 m	multiple	2004–2019	08 Feb 2019	38	—	MPC; JPL	
0	2004 PK121	MBA-I	19.3	410 m	multiple	2004–2019	28 Nov 2019	43	—	MPC; JPL	
0	2004 PL121	MBA-I	18.9	490 m	multiple	2004–2019	26 Nov 2019	37	—	MPC; JPL	
1	2004 PM121	MBA-O	17.6	1.7 km	multiple	2004–2019	25 Sep 2019	26	—	MPC; JPL	
0	2004 PV121	MBA-I	19.1	450 m	multiple	2004–2019	28 Aug 2019	31	Disc.: Pan-STARRS; Added on 22 July 2020	MPC; JPL	
2	2004 PY121	MBA-I	19.5	370 m	multiple	2004–2015	09 Oct 2015	24	Disc.: Spacewatch; Added on 19 October 2020	MPC; JPL	
0	2004 PZ121	MBA-O	18.2	1.3 km	multiple	2003–2020	15 Oct 2020	42	Disc.: Cerro Tololo; Added on 17 January 2021	MPC; JPL	
0	2004 PB122	MBA-M	18.4	1.2 km	multiple	2003–2021	19 Apr 2021	31	Disc.: Cerro Tololo; Added on 17 June 2021	MPC; JPL	
0	2004 PD122	MBA-M	17.8	1.5 km	multiple	2004–2021	15 Apr 2021	36	Disc.: Pan-STARRS 1 Added on 17 June 2021	MPC; JPL	
0	2004 PJ122	MBA-O	17.77	1.6 km	multiple	2004–2021	28 Sep 2021	49	Disc.: Spacewatch; Added on 30 September 2021	MPC; JPL	
0	2004 PK122	MBA-I	18.98	480 m	multiple	2004–2021	15 Mar 2021	33	Disc.: Pan-STARRS; Added on 5 November 2021	MPC; JPL	

back to top

== Q ==
U	Designation	Class	Physical		Observations				Description and notes	Ref
U	Designation	Class	H	D	Opp.	Arc	Last	Used	Description and notes	Ref
5	2004 QB	APO	19.8	390 m	single	30 days	15 Sep 2004	72	Potentially hazardous object	MPC; JPL
1	2004 QL	MBA-M	17.7	1.6 km	multiple	2004–2018	07 Sep 2018	39	Alt.: 2010 BD7	MPC; JPL
2	2004 QN	MBA-M	19.2	670 m	multiple	2004-2025	15 Nov 2025	26	—	MPC; JPL
0	2004 QP	MBA-I	19.32	390 m	multiple	2004-2019	26 Nov 2019	60	—	MPC; JPL
0	2004 QR	MCA	18.74	540 m	multiple	2004-2025	30 May 2025	35	—	MPC; JPL
2	2004 QZ1	APO	20.7	260 m	multiple	2004–2020	27 Apr 2020	132	—	MPC; JPL
6	2004 QA2	AMO	22.3	120 m	single	31 days	20 Sep 2004	33	—	MPC; JPL
9	2004 QX2	APO	21.7	160 m	single	17 days	06 Sep 2004	23	Potentially hazardous object	MPC; JPL
3	2004 QA3	MCA	18.56	570 m	multiple	2003-2025	31 Dec 2025	23	—	MPC; JPL
9	2004 QB3	ATE	24.4	47 m	single	13 days	03 Sep 2004	18	—	MPC; JPL
4	2004 QC3	MCA	19.9	310 m	single	70 days	23 Sep 2004	52	—	MPC; JPL
0	2004 QD3	APO	19.51	450 m	multiple	2004–2021	13 Jan 2021	378	—	MPC; JPL
7	2004 QR4	APO	26.9	15 m	single	3 days	23 Aug 2004	15	—	MPC; JPL
0	2004 QL5	MBA-M	17.5	1.8 km	multiple	2004–2018	10 Dec 2018	52	—	MPC; JPL
5	2004 QN5	AMO	21.3	200 m	single	47 days	08 Oct 2004	50	—	MPC; JPL
8	2004 QO5	APO	25.9	23 m	single	5 days	25 Aug 2004	9	—	MPC; JPL
0	2004 QC6	MBA-O	17.19	2.0 km	multiple	2004–2021	01 Dec 2021	79	—	MPC; JPL
9	2004 QG13	ATE	21.4	190 m	single	6 days	30 Aug 2004	47	—	MPC; JPL
7	2004 QJ13	AMO	25.3	31 m	single	2 days	25 Aug 2004	18	—	MPC; JPL
6	2004 QF14	APO	22.9	93 m	single	41 days	05 Oct 2004	82	—	MPC; JPL
1	2004 QA16	MBA-O	18.1	1.3 km	multiple	2004–2020	23 Aug 2020	23	Disc.: Mauna Kea Obs. Added on 19 October 2020	MPC; JPL
1	2004 QE16	MBA-I	19.73	340 m	multiple	2004–2021	01 May 2021	48	— Added on 22 July 2020; Alt.: 2014 HT59	MPC; JPL
3	2004 QP16	MBA-I	20.0	300 m	multiple	2004–2019	23 Oct 2019	25	—	MPC; JPL
0	2004 QA17	MCA	18.9	490 m	multiple	2004–2020	14 Nov 2020	62	Alt.: 2020 LT4	MPC; JPL
0	2004 QN20	MBA-O	17.26	2.0 km	multiple	2004–2022	22 Jan 2022	86	—	MPC; JPL
6	2004 QA22	ATE	27.9	9 m	single	10 days	04 Sep 2004	44	—	MPC; JPL
6	2004 QN22	APO	24.2	51 m	single	8 days	02 Sep 2004	29	AMO at MPC	MPC; JPL
0	2004 QW22	MBA-O	18.01	1.4 km	multiple	1999–2022	07 Jan 2022	35	Alt.: 2020 RM30	MPC; JPL
4	2004 QX22	MBA-O	18.14	2.4 km	multiple	2004-2024	06 Jul 2024	23	—	MPC; JPL
0	2004 QK23	MBA-I	19.24	420 m	multiple	2004–2021	08 Apr 2021	36	—	MPC; JPL
1	2004 QY25	MBA-O	16.9	2.3 km	multiple	2004–2020	18 Jan 2020	89	—	MPC; JPL
0	2004 QO27	MBA-I	19.3	410 m	multiple	2004–2020	14 Sep 2020	70	—	MPC; JPL
0	2004 QN28	MBA-M	18.38	890 m	multiple	2004–2021	10 Aug 2021	28	—	MPC; JPL
0	2004 QP28	MBA-I	18.5	590 m	multiple	2004–2015	14 Nov 2015	36	Alt.: 2011 PW4	MPC; JPL
4	2004 QE29	TNO	7.46	134 km	multiple	2004–2018	26 Nov 2018	31	LoUTNOs, other TNO	MPC; JPL
4	2004 QG29	TNO	7.9	109 km	multiple	2004–2014	22 Oct 2014	14	LoUTNOs, other TNO	MPC; JPL
4	2004 QH29	TNO	7.3	144 km	multiple	2004–2014	22 Oct 2014	24	LoUTNOs, other TNO	MPC; JPL
0	2004 QO31	MBA-M	18.09	1.0 km	multiple	2004–2021	04 Oct 2021	74	—	MPC; JPL
0	2004 QU31	MBA-M	17.5	1.3 km	multiple	2004–2020	26 Jan 2020	45	—	MPC; JPL
0	2004 QZ31	MBA-M	18.17	980 m	multiple	2004–2021	05 Oct 2021	71	—	MPC; JPL
0	2004 QN32	MCA	19.3	410 m	multiple	2004–2020	15 Sep 2020	60	—	MPC; JPL
0	2004 QP32	MBA-M	18.2	960 m	multiple	2004–2019	26 Feb 2019	40	—	MPC; JPL
1	2004 QS32	MBA-O	17.59	1.7 km	multiple	2004–2021	11 Nov 2021	41	—	MPC; JPL
2	2004 QT32	MBA-M	18.0	1.1 km	multiple	2004–2026	11 Aug 2026	30	—	MPC; JPL
0	2004 QV32	MBA-I	19.28	410 m	multiple	2004–2021	29 Nov 2021	40	—	MPC; JPL
1	2004 QX32	MBA-M	18.4	880 m	multiple	2004–2017	23 Sep 2017	15	—	MPC; JPL
0	2004 QY32	MBA-I	18.9	490 m	multiple	2004–2019	28 Nov 2019	61	Alt.: 2019 SS13	MPC; JPL
0	2004 QC33	MBA-I	18.2	680 m	multiple	2004–2019	20 Aug 2019	75	—	MPC; JPL
0	2004 QY33	MBA-O	17.2	2.0 km	multiple	2004–2020	12 Dec 2020	54	—	MPC; JPL
0	2004 QD34	MBA-M	17.9	1.1 km	multiple	2004–2020	29 Feb 2020	48	—	MPC; JPL
2	2004 QE34	MBA-O	17.6	1.7 km	multiple	2004–2019	08 Nov 2019	43	—	MPC; JPL
0	2004 QL34	MBA-I	18.7	540 m	multiple	2004–2019	21 Oct 2019	45	—	MPC; JPL
0	2004 QM34	MBA-I	19.46	380 m	multiple	2004–2021	05 Jul 2021	43	—	MPC; JPL
0	2004 QO34	MBA-I	18.7	540 m	multiple	2004–2017	21 Sep 2017	36	—	MPC; JPL
0	2004 QP34	MBA-M	17.9	1.5 km	multiple	2004–2020	23 Jan 2020	41	—	MPC; JPL
0	2004 QU34	MBA-I	18.4	620 m	multiple	2004–2019	01 Nov 2019	41	—	MPC; JPL
0	2004 QF35	MBA-M	18.6	1.1 km	multiple	2004–2018	06 Oct 2018	19	—	MPC; JPL
1	2004 QG35	MBA-M	18.4	1.2 km	multiple	2004–2018	05 Nov 2018	20	—	MPC; JPL
0	2004 QK35	MBA-M	18.0	1.1 km	multiple	2004–2019	27 Jan 2019	45	—	MPC; JPL
0	2004 QT35	MBA-M	18.2	960 m	multiple	2004–2017	13 Sep 2017	39	—	MPC; JPL
0	2004 QW35	MBA-I	19.1	450 m	multiple	2004–2019	25 Sep 2019	35	—	MPC; JPL
1	2004 QD36	MBA-I	18.7	540 m	multiple	2004–2019	01 Oct 2019	24	—	MPC; JPL
0	2004 QE36	MBA-I	18.4	620 m	multiple	1997–2019	28 Nov 2019	49	—	MPC; JPL
0	2004 QH36	MBA-I	19.1	450 m	multiple	2004–2019	17 Dec 2019	43	—	MPC; JPL
2	2004 QJ36	MBA-O	17.7	1.6 km	multiple	2004–2019	27 Oct 2019	37	—	MPC; JPL
2	2004 QK36	MBA-O	17.7	1.6 km	multiple	2004–2019	24 Dec 2019	35	—	MPC; JPL
1	2004 QU36	MBA-I	19.0	470 m	multiple	2004–2019	02 Nov 2019	39	—	MPC; JPL
0	2004 QW36	MBA-I	18.59	570 m	multiple	2004–2021	08 May 2021	34	—	MPC; JPL
1	2004 QX36	MBA-M	18.1	1.3 km	multiple	2004–2018	10 Oct 2018	32	—	MPC; JPL
2	2004 QC37	MBA-M	18.95	900 m	multiple	2004–2018	07 Nov 2018	26	Disc.: Spacewatch; Added on 19 October 2020	MPC; JPL
0	2004 QE37	MBA-I	19.7	340 m	multiple	2004–2020	05 Nov 2020	53	Disc.: Spacewatch; Added on 17 January 2021	MPC; JPL
0	2004 QJ37	MBA-I	19.14	440 m	multiple	2004–2021	07 Nov 2021	72	Disc.: Spacewatch; Added on 17 January 2021	MPC; JPL
0	2004 QL37	MBA-I	18.7	540 m	multiple	2004–2019	22 Oct 2019	28	Disc.: Spacewatch; Added on 17 January 2021	MPC; JPL
1	2004 QP37	MBA-O	17.4	1.8 km	multiple	2004–2020	07 Dec 2020	27	Disc.: Spacewatch; Added on 9 March 2021	MPC; JPL
0	2004 QQ37	MBA-M	18.4	1.2 km	multiple	2004–2018	06 Oct 2018	28	Disc.: Spacewatch; Added on 9 March 2021	MPC; JPL
0	2004 QU37	MBA-M	18.02	1.0 km	multiple	2004–2021	12 Aug 2021	42	Disc.: Spacewatch; Added on 17 June 2021	MPC; JPL
0	2004 QW37	MBA-M	18.21	960 m	multiple	2004–2021	12 May 2021	40	Disc.: Spacewatch; Added on 17 June 2021	MPC; JPL
0	2004 QX37	MBA-M	17.9	1.1 km	multiple	2004–2019	10 Jan 2019	28	Disc.: Spacewatch; Added on 17 June 2021	MPC; JPL
0	2004 QY37	MBA-I	19.4	390 m	multiple	2004–2020	23 May 2020	23	Disc.: Spacewatch; Added on 17 June 2021	MPC; JPL
0	2004 QB38	MBA-I	19.16	440 m	multiple	2004–2021	28 Nov 2021	28	Disc.: Spacewatch; Added on 21 August 2021	MPC; JPL
0	2004 QC38	MCA	20.09	290 m	multiple	2004–2021	03 Oct 2021	34	Disc.: Spacewatch; Added on 21 August 2021	MPC; JPL
0	2004 QG38	MBA-O	17.23	2.0 km	multiple	2004–2021	27 Oct 2021	38	Disc.: Spacewatch; Added on 30 September 2021	MPC; JPL
0	2004 QH38	MBA-O	16.8	2.4 km	multiple	2004–2021	02 Oct 2021	72	Disc.: WISE; Added on 30 September 2021; Alt.: 2010 MU82	MPC; JPL
0	2004 QJ38	MBA-I	19.43	390 m	multiple	2004–2021	07 Nov 2021	66	Disc.: Spacewatch; Added on 30 September 2021	MPC; JPL
2	2004 QK38	MBA-O	17.84	1.5 km	multiple	2004–2021	04 Oct 2021	24	Disc.: Spacewatch; Added on 30 September 2021	MPC; JPL
1	2004 QM38	MBA-I	19.56	360 m	multiple	2004–2023	27 Aug 2023	24	Disc.: Spacewatch; Added on 5 November 2021	MPC; JPL
1	2004 QO38	MBA-M	18.21	680 m	multiple	2004–2022	04 Jan 2022	96	Disc.: Spacewatch; Added on 5 November 2021; Alt.: 2004 RB28	MPC; JPL
0	2004 QQ38	MBA-M	18.42	620 m	multiple	2000–2022	06 Jan 2022	29	Disc.: Spacewatch; Added on 5 November 2021	MPC; JPL
1	2004 QR38	MBA-O	16.45	2.9 km	multiple	2004–2022	07 Jan 2022	22	Disc.: Spacewatch; Added on 5 November 2021	MPC; JPL
0	2004 QU38	MBA-O	17.83	1.5 km	multiple	2004–2021	28 Nov 2021	52	Disc.: Spacewatch; Added on 24 December 2021	MPC; JPL
0	2004 QV38	MBA-M	18.50	590 m	multiple	2004–2021	30 Nov 2021	28	Disc.: Spacewatch; Added on 24 December 2021	MPC; JPL
0	2004 QX38	MBA-O	17.2	2.0 km	multiple	2002–2021	30 Oct 2021	32	Disc.: Spacewatch; Added on 24 December 2021	MPC; JPL

back to top
