= List of unnumbered minor planets: 2004 J–O =

This is a partial list of unnumbered minor planets for principal provisional designations assigned between 1 May and 31 July 2004. As of April 2026, a total of 149 bodies remain unnumbered for this period. Objects for this year are listed on the following pages: A–B · C · D–E · F · G–H · J–O · P–Q · R_{i} · R_{ii} · R_{iii} · S · T_{i} · T_{ii} · T_{iii} · T_{iv} · U–V · W–X and Y. Also see previous and next year.

Near-Earth obj.	MBA (inner)	MBA (outer)	Centaur
Mars-crosser	MBA (middle)	Jupiter trojan	Trans-Neptunian obj.
Unclassified

== J ==
U	Designation	Class	Physical		Observations				Description and notes	Ref											
U	Designation	Class	H	D	Opp.	Arc	Last	Used	Description and notes	Ref											
6	2004 JB	AMO	22.5	110 m	single	29 days	30 May 2004	25	—	MPC · JPL											
9	2004 JC	APO	20.5	280 m	single	21 days	29 May 2004	55	—	MPC · JPL											
0	2004 JN1	APO	23.7	65 m	multiple	2004–2021	15 Jun 2021	104	—	MPC · JPL											
8	2004 JO1	APO	20.9	230 m	single	20 days	30 May 2004	124	—	MPC · JPL											
2	2004 JP1	APO	22.7	100 m	multiple	2004–2016	23 Nov 2016	184	—	MPC · JPL											
0	2004 JR1	AMO	17.5	1.1 km	multiple	1999–2019	24 Dec 2019	529	NEO larger than 1 kilometer Alt.: 1999 LL4	MPC · JPL											
0	2004 JM2	MBA-I	18.9	490 m	multiple	2004–2015	08 Sep 2015	33	Alt.: 2011 GX17	MPC · JPL											
0	2004 JU2	MBA-I	19.25	420 m	multiple	2004–2019	02 Apr 2019	21	Disc.: LPL/Spacewatch II; Added on 17 June 2021; Alt.: 2015 AD223	MPC · JPL											
1	2004 JY3	MBA-I	19.06	370 m	multiple	2004-2022	02 Jun 2022	43	—	MPC · JPL											
0	2004 JP9	MBA-M	17.6	1.3 km	multiple	2004–2021	09 Jun 2021	24	Disc.: LPL/Spacewatch II; Added on 17 June 2021	MPC · JPL											
7	2004 JO12	AMO	23.8	62 m	single	9 days	23 May 2004	54	—	MPC · JPL											
1	2004 JP12	APO	23.59	74 m	multiple	2004-2025	16 May 2025	32	—	MPC · JPL											
5	2004 JO20	APO	26.2	20 m	single	3 days	17 May 2004	35	—	MPC · JPL											
8	2004 JU20	AMO	25.3	31 m	single	3 days	16 May 2004	8	—	MPC · JPL											
8	2004 JV20	APO	24.0	56 m	single	2 days	17 May 2004	22	—	MPC · JPL	0	2004 JZ38	MCA	19.1	450 m	multiple	2004–2021	21 Jun 2021	34	—	MPC · JPL
0	2004 JH39	MBA-O	17.2	2.0 km	multiple	2004–2021	10 May 2021	33	Disc.: Spacewatch; Added on 17 June 2021	MPC · JPL											
0	2004 JM48	MBA-I	19.0	470 m	multiple	2004–2020	16 Jun 2020	39	Alt.: 2007 HU29	MPC · JPL											
0	2004 JH49	MBA-I	18.5	590 m	multiple	2004–2020	20 Oct 2020	43	Disc.: Spacewatch; Added on 19 October 2020	MPC · JPL											
0	2004 JH56	MBA-O	16.83	2.7 km	multiple	2004–2021	16 Apr 2021	40	Alt.: 2010 DV16	MPC · JPL											
0	2004 JD57	MCA	18.9	490 m	multiple	2004–2020	22 Apr 2020	58	—	MPC · JPL											
0	2004 JH57	MBA-I	18.5	590 m	multiple	2004–2019	02 Jan 2019	43	—	MPC · JPL											
0	2004 JN57	MBA-I	19.0	470 m	multiple	2004–2018	23 Apr 2018	35	—	MPC · JPL											
0	2004 JR57	MBA-I	18.2	680 m	multiple	2004–2016	05 Dec 2016	32	—	MPC · JPL											
0	2004 JU57	MBA-I	18.1	710 m	multiple	2004–2019	26 Nov 2019	63	—	MPC · JPL											
0	2004 JR58	MBA-O	17.43	1.8 km	multiple	2004–2021	30 May 2021	40	Disc.: LPL/Spacewatch II; Added on 11 May 2021	MPC · JPL											
3	2004 JU58	MBA-M	18.0	750 m	multiple	2004–2016	02 Mar 2016	17	Disc.: Spacewatch; Added on 29 January 2022	MPC · JPL											

back to top

== K ==
U	Designation	Class	Physical		Observations				Description and notes	Ref
U	Designation	Class	H	D	Opp.	Arc	Last	Used	Description and notes	Ref
0	2004 KA	AMO	21.02	220 m	multiple	2004–2021	26 Oct 2021	267	—	MPC · JPL
0	2004 KB	APO	21.1	220 m	multiple	2004–2026	03 May 2026	102	Potentially hazardous object	MPC · JPL
8	2004 KZ	APO	25.5	28 m	single	2 days	20 May 2004	26	—	MPC · JPL
1	2004 KF1	AMO	20.8	250 m	multiple	2004–2007	10 Mar 2007	101	—	MPC · JPL
0	2004 KG1	ATE	24.04	60 m	multiple	2004-2ß23	24 Jul 2023	104	—	MPC · JPL
0	2004 KR2	MBA-M	18.14	990 m	multiple	2004–2021	18 May 2021	51	Disc.: Spacewatch; Added on 11 May 2021	MPC · JPL
6	2004 KN10	AMO	23.6	68 m	single	24 days	14 Jun 2004	45	—	MPC · JPL
0	2004 KF15	AMO	20.7	260 m	multiple	2004–2019	08 Oct 2019	119	—	MPC · JPL
5	2004 KE17	AMO	21.5	180 m	single	10 days	07 Jun 2004	61	Potentially hazardous object	MPC · JPL
5	2004 KF17	APO	26.1	21 m	single	3 days	31 May 2004	41	—	MPC · JPL
7	2004 KG17	AMO	27.1	14 m	single	6 days	03 Jun 2004	13	—	MPC · JPL
4	2004 KV18	TNO	8.9	92 km	multiple	2004–2016	29 May 2016	22	LoUTNOs, centaur	MPC · JPL
2	2004 KZ18	TNO	8.4	76 km	multiple	2004–2015	12 Jun 2015	18	LoUTNOs, res · 2:5	MPC · JPL
3	2004 KB19	TNO	7.4	114 km	multiple	2004–2015	15 Apr 2015	19	LoUTNOs, plutino, binary: 108 km	MPC · JPL
2	2004 KC19	TNO	8.2	108 km	multiple	2004–2016	29 May 2016	19	LoUTNOs, plutino	MPC · JPL
4	2004 KD19	TNO	7.4	138 km	multiple	2004–2008	05 May 2008	14	LoUTNOs, other TNO	MPC · JPL
2	2004 KE19	TNO	6.4	174 km	multiple	2004–2020	23 Jun 2020	25	LoUTNOs, cubewano (cold), binary: 129 km	MPC · JPL
2	2004 KF19	TNO	6.9	139 km	multiple	2004–2016	08 Jun 2016	22	LoUTNOs, cubewano (cold)	MPC · JPL
3	2004 KG19	TNO	7.4	110 km	multiple	2004–2015	15 Apr 2015	19	LoUTNOs, cubewano (cold)	MPC · JPL
4	2004 KH19	TNO	6.4	218 km	multiple	2004–2016	08 Jun 2016	23	LoUTNOs, other TNO, binary: 135 km	MPC · JPL
3	2004 KJ19	TNO	7.1	158 km	multiple	2004–2019	06 Jun 2019	83	LoUTNOs, other TNO	MPC · JPL
3	2004 KK19	TNO	7.2	125 km	multiple	2004–2010	20 Mar 2010	24	LoUTNOs, cubewano?	MPC · JPL
3	2004 KL19	TNO	8.7	66 km	multiple	2004–2008	05 May 2008	20	LoUTNOs, twotino	MPC · JPL
3	2004 KM19	TNO	8.2	83 km	multiple	2004–2008	08 Jun 2008	18	LoUTNOs, twotino	MPC · JPL
0	2004 KY20	HUN	18.6	570 m	multiple	2004–2018	14 Dec 2018	31	—	MPC · JPL
0	2004 KY21	MBA-O	17.6	1.7 km	multiple	2004–2019	03 Sep 2019	25	—	MPC · JPL
0	2004 KH22	HIL	16.7	2.5 km	multiple	2004–2015	09 Dec 2015	23	Disc.: Pan-STARRS; Added on 22 July 2020	MPC · JPL

back to top

== L ==
U	Designation	Class	Physical		Observations				Description and notes	Ref
U	Designation	Class	H	D	Opp.	Arc	Last	Used	Description and notes	Ref
2	2004 LB	APO	21.6	170 m	multiple	2004–2018	14 Jun 2018	157	Potentially hazardous object	MPC · JPL
7	2004 LC	APO	24.4	47 m	single	7 days	15 Jun 2004	79	—	MPC · JPL
0	2004 LK	AMO	22.7	100 m	multiple	2004–2007	24 May 2007	67	—	MPC · JPL
6	2004 LV	APO	24.1	54 m	single	3 days	12 Jun 2004	21	—	MPC · JPL
5	2004 LB1	APO	23.2	81 m	single	9 days	19 Jun 2004	40	—	MPC · JPL
8	2004 LB2	APO	22.3	120 m	single	4 days	15 Jun 2004	54	—	MPC · JPL
6	2004 LD2	AMO	21.2	200 m	single	32 days	13 Jul 2004	57	—	MPC · JPL
7	2004 LO2	ATE	25.0	36 m	single	4 days	15 Jun 2004	31	—	MPC · JPL
8	2004 LX5	AMO	25.6	27 m	single	1 day	13 Jun 2004	18	—	MPC · JPL
0	2004 LY5	APO	21.68	180 m	multiple	2004-2022	13 Feb 2022	66	Potentially hazardous object	MPC · JPL
0	2004 LZ5	AMO	18.43	730 m	multiple	2004–2021	13 Sep 2021	90	—	MPC · JPL
6	2004 LA6	AMO	21.8	160 m	single	41 days	24 Jul 2004	43	—	MPC · JPL
5	2004 LA10	AMO	25.1	34 m	single	14 days	28 Jun 2004	52	—	MPC · JPL
0	2004 LH18	MCA	19.8	610 m	multiple	2004–2019	04 Aug 2019	43	Alt.: 2019 MZ1	MPC · JPL
0	2004 LR18	MBA-M	17.6	1.7 km	multiple	2004–2014	23 Nov 2014	31	Alt.: 2014 WS244	MPC · JPL
1	2004 LQ19	MBA-I	18.4	620 m	multiple	2004–2019	31 Oct 2019	41	—	MPC · JPL
0	2004 LA24	HUN	18.8	520 m	multiple	2004–2020	30 Jun 2020	20	Disc.: Spacewatch; Added on 13 September 2020	MPC · JPL
0	2004 LN27	MBA-M	16.4	2.9 km	multiple	2000–2021	23 Jan 2021	150	Alt.: 2012 CD38, 2014 QZ292	MPC · JPL
0	2004 LX28	MBA-M	17.6	1.3 km	multiple	2004–2021	10 Sep 2021	29	Disc.: Spacewatch; Added on 30 September 2021	MPC · JPL
3	2004 LV31	TNO	8.8	60 km	multiple	2004–2005	03 Aug 2005	10	LoUTNOs, cubewano?	MPC · JPL
2	2004 LW31	TNO	7.0	132 km	multiple	2004–2019	29 Jul 2019	39	LoUTNOs, cubewano (cold)	MPC · JPL
9	2004 LT32	TNO	6.89	158 km	multiple	2004–2005	03 Aug 2005	12	LoUTNOs, SDO	MPC · JPL
9	2004 LU32	TNO	8.61	65 km	multiple	2004–2005	03 Aug 2005	7	— Added on 22 July 2020; LoUTNOs, cubewano?	MPC · JPL
9	2004 LV32	TNO	8.94	68 km	single	37 days	16 Jul 2004	8	— Added on 22 July 2020; LoUTNOs, other TNO	MPC · JPL
9	2004 LW32	TNO	8.11	90 km	single	37 days	16 Jul 2004	8	— Added on 22 July 2020; LoUTNOs, SDO	MPC · JPL
9	2004 LX32	TNO	8.23	126 km	single	37 days	16 Jul 2004	7	— Added on 22 July 2020; LoUTNOs, centaur	MPC · JPL
9	2004 LY32	TNO	7.16	154 km	single	36 days	15 Jul 2004	7	— Added on 22 July 2020; LoUTNOs, other TNO	MPC · JPL
9	2004 LZ32	TNO	7.91	109 km	single	62 days	10 Aug 2004	7	— Added on 22 July 2020; LoUTNOs, other TNO	MPC · JPL
9	2004 LA33	TNO	8.6	123 km	single	64 days	12 Aug 2004	11	— Added on 22 July 2020	MPC · JPL
E	2004 LB33	TNO	8.5	111 km	single	2 days	11 Jun 2004	5	— Added on 22 July 2020; LoUTNOs	MPC · JPL
E	2004 LC33	TNO	7.9	109 km	single	2 days	11 Jun 2004	5	— Added on 22 July 2020; LoUTNOs, other TNO	MPC · JPL
E	2004 LD33	TNO	8.5	94 km	single	2 days	11 Jun 2004	4	— Added on 22 July 2020; LoUTNOs, plutino?	MPC · JPL
9	2004 LE33	TNO	8.77	98 km	single	2 days	11 Jun 2004	4	— Added on 22 July 2020; LoUTNOs, centaur	MPC · JPL

back to top

== M ==
U	Designation	Class	Physical		Observations				Description and notes	Ref
U	Designation	Class	H	D	Opp.	Arc	Last	Used	Description and notes	Ref
7	2004 MC	APO	23.3	78 m	single	15 days	30 Jun 2004	131	—	MPC · JPL
8	2004 MN1	APO	24.6	43 m	single	1 day	17 Jun 2004	7	—	MPC · JPL
9	2004 MO1	AMO	23.2	81 m	single	2 days	19 Jun 2004	22	—	MPC · JPL
9	2004 MP1	APO	25.2	32 m	single	7 days	24 Jun 2004	34	—	MPC · JPL
7	2004 MR1	APO	25.6	27 m	single	1 day	19 Jun 2004	38	—	MPC · JPL
6	2004 MS1	APO	22.3	120 m	single	21 days	09 Jul 2004	87	—	MPC · JPL
7	2004 MV2	APO	23.5	71 m	single	4 days	23 Jun 2004	22	—	MPC · JPL
0	2004 MX2	APO	19.30	1.3 km	multiple	2004–2019	14 Jan 2019	97	Potentially hazardous object	MPC · JPL
5	2004 MO	AMO	24.9	37 m	single	32 days	24 Jul 2004	79	—	MPC · JPL
1	2004 MA5	MBA-M	17.54	940 m	multiple	2004-2021	12 Sep 2021	35	—	MPC · JPL
1	2004 MB5	MCA	17.07	1.1 km	multiple	2004-2024	12 Feb 2024	53	—	MPC · JPL
0	2004 MB6	APO	19.6	430 m	multiple	2004–2012	07 Jul 2012	62	—	MPC · JPL
0	2004 MJ6	MBA-O	17.05	2.2 km	multiple	2004–2021	04 Aug 2021	57	Disc.: Spacewatch; Added on 24 December 2021	MPC · JPL
0	2004 MQ6	APO	19.7	410 m	multiple	2004–2014	01 Jun 2014	128	—	MPC · JPL
6	2004 MP7	APO	21.7	160 m	single	26 days	22 Jul 2004	62	Potentially hazardous object	MPC · JPL
1	2004 MZ7	MCA	17.8	1.5 km	multiple	2004–2019	26 May 2019	232	—	MPC · JPL
4	2004 MS8	TNO	8.3	103 km	multiple	2004–2013	06 Oct 2013	18	LoUTNOs, plutino	MPC · JPL
4	2004 MT8	TNO	6.5	167 km	multiple	2004–2015	12 Jun 2015	16	LoUTNOs, cubewano (cold)	MPC · JPL
4	2004 MU8	TNO	5.95	160 km	multiple	2004–2021	09 Jul 2021	36	LoUTNOs, cubewano (cold), binary: 143 km	MPC · JPL
4	2004 MV8	TNO	6.88	152 km	multiple	2004–2021	09 Aug 2021	18	LoUTNOs, twotino?	MPC · JPL
0	2004 MX9	MBA-I	18.3	650 m	multiple	2004–2019	24 Sep 2019	46	—	MPC · JPL
9	2004 MK10	TNO	8.01	139 km	single	51 days	12 Aug 2004	8	Disc.: Mauna Kea Obs. Added on 22 July 2020; LoUTNOs, centaur	MPC · JPL
9	2004 MM10	TNO	7.21	201 km	single	22 days	15 Jul 2004	7	Disc.: Mauna Kea Obs. Added on 22 July 2020; LoUTNOs, centaur	MPC · JPL
9	2004 MN10	TNO	8.02	104 km	single	55 days	10 Aug 2004	6	Disc.: Mauna Kea Obs. Added on 22 July 2020; LoUTNOs, other TNO	MPC · JPL
9	2004 MO10	TNO	8.12	132 km	single	51 days	12 Aug 2004	6	Disc.: Mauna Kea Obs. Added on 22 July 2020; LoUTNOs, centaur	MPC · JPL
E	2004 MP10	TNO	8.0	119 km	single	47 days	10 Aug 2004	5	Disc.: Mauna Kea Obs. Added on 22 July 2020; LoUTNOs, plutino?	MPC · JPL

back to top

== N ==
U	Designation	Class	Physical		Observations				Description and notes	Ref
U	Designation	Class	H	D	Opp.	Arc	Last	Used	Description and notes	Ref
6	2004 NF3	AMO	24.5	45 m	single	11 days	22 Jul 2004	38	—	MPC · JPL
0	2004 NT7	MCA	18.0	750 m	multiple	2004–2020	29 Jan 2020	48	—	MPC · JPL
8	2004 NU7	APO	24.4	47 m	single	7 days	21 Jul 2004	22	AMO at MPC	MPC · JPL
7	2004 NK8	APO	23.5	71 m	single	28 days	11 Aug 2004	27	—	MPC · JPL
1	2004 NM8	AMO	21.3	200 m	multiple	2004–2016	28 Aug 2016	58	—	MPC · JPL
–	2004 NN8	TNO	15.3	5.0 km	multiple	2004–2005	01 May 2005	82	LoUTNOs, damocloid	MPC · JPL
1	2004 NR13	MBA-M	17.7	1.2 km	multiple	2004–2017	22 Oct 2017	34	—	MPC · JPL
0	2004 NU18	MCA	19.8	330 m	multiple	2004–2018	15 Oct 2018	44	— Added on 22 July 2020; Alt.: 2012 GB12	MPC · JPL
1	2004 NN28	MBA-M	17.6	900 m	multiple	2004–2020	21 Jul 2020	61	—	MPC · JPL
1	2004 NM30	MBA-M	18.42	620 m	multiple	2004–2021	31 Oct 2021	44	—	MPC · JPL
1	2004 NN31	MCA	19.65	350 m	multiple	2004–2019	29 Oct 2019	87	—	MPC · JPL
0	2004 NU33	MCA	19.05	460 m	multiple	2004–2021	11 May 2021	56	—	MPC · JPL

back to top

== O ==
U	Designation	Class	Physical		Observations				Description and notes	Ref
U	Designation	Class	H	D	Opp.	Arc	Last	Used	Description and notes	Ref
6	2004 OD4	APO	27.0	14 m	single	4 days	21 Jul 2004	33	—	MPC · JPL
2	2004 OF6	AMO	21.2	200 m	multiple	2004–2017	11 Nov 2017	50	—	MPC · JPL
0	2004 OO8	MBA-O	17.4	1.8 km	multiple	2004–2019	28 Dec 2019	66	—	MPC · JPL
0	2004 OP10	MCA	17.73	1.2 km	multiple	2004–2021	27 Sep 2021	145	—	MPC · JPL
1	2004 OW10	APO	24.61	50 m	multiple	2004-2023	25 Mar 2023	51	—	MPC · JPL
E	2004 OL12	TNO	6.1	200 km	single	64 days	18 Sep 2004	7	LoUTNOs, cubewano (cold)	MPC · JPL
1	2004 OF13	MBA-M	18.53	900 m	multiple	2004-2023	21 Jan 2023	45	Alt.: 2022 QF231	MPC · JPL
3	2004 OJ14	TNO	6.4	218 km	multiple	2004–2007	11 Jul 2007	13	LoUTNOs, other TNO, BR-mag: 1.42; taxonomy: IR	MPC · JPL
4	2004 OL14	TNO	8.09	91 km	multiple	2004–2005	09 Aug 2005	11	LoUTNOs, SDO	MPC · JPL
4	2004 OP15	TNO	6.9	173 km	multiple	2004–2017	04 Jul 2017	18	LoUTNOs, other TNO	MPC · JPL
5	2004 OQ15	TNO	6.64	170 km	multiple	2004–2021	09 Jul 2021	31	LoUTNOs, res · 4:7, BR-mag: 1.36; taxonomy: BR-IR	MPC · JPL
4	2004 OS15	TNO	7.2	137 km	multiple	2004–2019	04 Sep 2019	21	LoUTNOs, SDO	MPC · JPL
1	2004 OC16	MBA-I	18.4	620 m	multiple	2004–2019	10 Mar 2019	41	—	MPC · JPL
1	2004 OG16	MBA-I	18.7	540 m	multiple	2004–2018	19 Mar 2018	29	—	MPC · JPL
0	2004 OH16	MBA-I	19.4	390 m	multiple	2004–2020	10 Aug 2020	31	—	MPC · JPL
1	2004 OL16	MBA-I	19.6	360 m	multiple	2004–2014	25 Oct 2014	25	—	MPC · JPL
0	2004 OM16	MBA-I	19.43	390 m	multiple	2004–2021	30 Oct 2021	21	—	MPC · JPL
1	2004 OY16	MBA-O	17.6	1.7 km	multiple	2004–2019	03 Oct 2019	39	—	MPC · JPL
2	2004 OQ17	MBA-O	17.8	1.5 km	multiple	2004–2019	23 Oct 2019	19	Disc.: Cerro Tololo; Added on 17 June 2021	MPC · JPL
0	2004 OR17	MBA-O	17.80	1.5 km	multiple	1999–2021	09 Nov 2021	61	Disc.: Cerro Tololo; Added on 5 November 2021	MPC · JPL
1	2004 OS17	MBA-M	17.87	790 m	multiple	2004–2022	04 Jan 2022	25	Disc.: Cerro Tololo; Added on 24 December 2021	MPC · JPL

back to top
