= List of unnumbered minor planets: 2004 T (300–619) =

This is a partial list of unnumbered minor planets for principal provisional designations assigned during 1–15 October 2004. Since this period yielded a high number of provisional discoveries, it is further split into several standalone pages. As of March 2026, a total of 129 bodies remain unnumbered for this period. Objects for this year are listed on the following pages: A–B · C · D–E · F · G–H · J–O · P–Q · R_{i} · R_{ii} · R_{iii} · S · T_{i} · T_{ii} · T_{iii} · T_{iv} · U–V · W–X and Y. Also see previous and next year.

Near-Earth obj.	MBA (inner)	MBA (outer)	Centaur
Mars-crosser	MBA (middle)	Jupiter trojan	Trans-Neptunian obj.
Unclassified

== T ==
U	Designation	Class	Physical		Observations				Description and notes	Ref
U	Designation	Class	H	D	Opp.	Arc	Last	Used	Description and notes	Ref
1	2004 TN300	MBA-I	19.53	370 m	multiple	2004–2021	30 Nov 2021	35	Disc.: Spacewatch	MPC · JPL
2	2004 TP303	MBA-M	18.5	590 m	multiple	2004–2016	07 Aug 2016	61	Disc.: Spacewatch; Alt.: 2012 QG46, 2014 AR60	MPC · JPL
0	2004 TC309	MBA-I	19.0	470 m	multiple	2004–2020	23 Jan 2020	37	Disc.: Spacewatch; Added on 22 July 2020	MPC · JPL
1	2004 TN309	HUN	19.5	370 m	multiple	2004–2019	07 May 2019	33	Disc.: Spacewatch	MPC · JPL
2	2004 TR313	MBA-M	18.62	790 m	multiple	2004–2021	07 Nov 2021	30	Disc.: Spacewatch; Added on 5 November 2021	MPC · JPL
1	2004 TX314	MBA-M	18.5	590 m	multiple	2002–2016	07 Aug 2016	37	Disc.: Spacewatch; Alt.: 2012 QC3	MPC · JPL
2	2004 TG315	MBA-O	17.4	1.8 km	multiple	2004–2020	05 Nov 2020	60	Disc.: Spacewatch	MPC · JPL
1	2004 TO315	MBA-I	19.4	390 m	multiple	2004–2020	16 May 2020	25	Disc.: Spacewatch; Added on 24 December 2021	MPC · JPL
1	2004 TR315	MBA-O	17.1	2.1 km	multiple	2004–2021	05 Jan 2021	54	Disc.: Spacewatch; Added on 17 January 2021	MPC · JPL
2	2004 TT316	MBA-O	17.8	1.5 km	multiple	2004–2020	22 Oct 2020	28	Disc.: Spacewatch; Added on 17 January 2021	MPC · JPL
0	2004 TU316	MBA-M	17.9	1.1 km	multiple	2002–2021	12 Sep 2021	53	Disc.: Spacewatch; Added on 30 September 2021; Alt.: 2021 QK35	MPC · JPL
0	2004 TG318	HIL	16.70	2.5 km	multiple	2004–2022	25 Jan 2022	61	Disc.: Spacewatch	MPC · JPL
1	2004 TK318	MBA-M	18.5	1.1 km	multiple	2004–2013	08 Nov 2013	18	Disc.: Spacewatch	MPC · JPL
0	2004 TZ318	MBA-I	19.85	360 m	multiple	2004-2022	28 Sep 2022	46	Disc.: Spacewatch	MPC · JPL
3	2004 TD319	MBA-I	18.9	490 m	multiple	2000–2012	08 Dec 2012	27	Disc.: Spacewatch; Alt.: 2008 UW194	MPC · JPL
1	2004 TB320	MBA-O	17.6	1.7 km	multiple	2004–2020	07 Oct 2020	49	Disc.: Spacewatch; Added on 19 October 2020; Alt.: 2015 TY251	MPC · JPL
0	2004 TT320	MBA-M	18.41	870 m	multiple	2004–2021	13 Nov 2021	65	Disc.: Spacewatch; Added on 5 November 2021	MPC · JPL
0	2004 TV322	MBA-I	18.2	680 m	multiple	2004–2019	19 Nov 2019	58	Disc.: Spacewatch	MPC · JPL
0	2004 TG325	MBA-O	17.49	1.8 km	multiple	2004–2021	07 Nov 2021	47	Disc.: Spacewatch; Added on 19 October 2020; Alt.: 2015 UG20	MPC · JPL
1	2004 TL325	MBA-M	17.7	1.6 km	multiple	2004–2021	08 May 2021	35	Disc.: LPL/Spacewatch II	MPC · JPL
0	2004 TM325	MBA-O	17.64	1.7 km	multiple	2004–2021	30 Nov 2021	51	Disc.: LPL/Spacewatch II; Added on 17 January 2021; Alt.: 2015 RV306	MPC · JPL
0	2004 TM326	MBA-M	17.67	870 m	multiple	2004–2021	08 Dec 2021	66	Disc.: NEAT	MPC · JPL
3	2004 TZ329	MBA-M	18.81	510 m	multiple	2004–2022	28 Jan 2022	32	Disc.: Spacewatch; Added on 29 January 2022	MPC · JPL
1	2004 TA330	MBA-M	17.8	1.5 km	multiple	2004–2013	21 Oct 2013	33	Disc.: Spacewatch	MPC · JPL
1	2004 TH330	MBA-O	17.6	1.7 km	multiple	2004–2020	24 Oct 2020	30	Disc.: Spacewatch; Added on 17 January 2021	MPC · JPL
0	2004 TJ330	MBA-O	17.31	1.9 km	multiple	2004–2021	30 Nov 2021	64	Disc.: Spacewatch	MPC · JPL
1	2004 TK330	MBA-I	18.9	490 m	multiple	2004–2019	31 Oct 2019	28	Disc.: Spacewatch	MPC · JPL
1	2004 TF332	MBA-I	19.1	450 m	multiple	2004–2018	05 Oct 2018	46	Disc.: Spacewatch; Alt.: 2011 SZ242	MPC · JPL
2	2004 TN332	MBA-M	18.36	1.2 km	multiple	2004–2018	12 Nov 2018	49	Disc.: Spacewatch; Added on 22 July 2020; Alt.: 2018 TY15	MPC · JPL
0	2004 TE334	MBA-O	17.54	1.7 km	multiple	2004–2020	13 Aug 2020	40	Disc.: Spacewatch; Alt.: 2015 VK55	MPC · JPL
0	2004 TA335	MBA-O	17.42	1.8 km	multiple	2004–2021	30 Nov 2021	92	Disc.: Spacewatch; Alt.: 2010 WV66	MPC · JPL
0	2004 TF336	MBA-I	18.5	590 m	multiple	2004–2018	14 Jun 2018	39	Disc.: Spacewatch	MPC · JPL
0	2004 TM339	MBA-I	18.6	570 m	multiple	2004–2019	26 Sep 2019	32	Disc.: Spacewatch; Alt.: 2015 PG92	MPC · JPL
0	2004 TE343	MBA-M	18.33	910 m	multiple	2004–2022	04 Jan 2022	44	Disc.: Spacewatch	MPC · JPL
0	2004 TG344	MBA-M	18.4	880 m	multiple	2004–2021	06 Nov 2021	40	Disc.: Spacewatch; Added on 29 January 2022	MPC · JPL
0	2004 TE346	MBA-O	16.45	2.9 km	multiple	2004–2021	07 Nov 2021	56	Disc.: Spacewatch	MPC · JPL
0	2004 TC349	MBA-O	17.67	1.6 km	multiple	2004–2021	28 Oct 2021	31	Disc.: Spacewatch; Alt.: 2015 PF288	MPC · JPL
3	2004 TD350	MBA-M	18.6	1.1 km	multiple	2004–2018	29 Nov 2018	15	Disc.: Kitt Peak; Added on 21 August 2021	MPC · JPL
0	2004 TH350	MBA-M	18.0	1.4 km	multiple	2004–2021	09 May 2021	23	Disc.: Kitt Peak; Added on 21 August 2021; Alt.: 2021 HK25	MPC · JPL
0	2004 TJ350	MBA-M	18.0	1.4 km	multiple	2004–2018	15 Sep 2018	27	Disc.: Kitt Peak Obs.	MPC · JPL
1	2004 TN350	MBA-M	18.76	530 m	multiple	2004–2021	11 Oct 2021	18	Disc.: Kitt Peak Obs. Added on 13 September 2020	MPC · JPL
0	2004 TU351	MBA-I	18.7	540 m	multiple	2004–2019	28 Oct 2019	30	Disc.: Kitt Peak Obs.	MPC · JPL
2	2004 TW351	MBA-M	19.05	460 m	multiple	2004–2021	09 Dec 2021	34	Disc.: Kitt Peak; Added on 24 December 2021	MPC · JPL
0	2004 TX351	MBA-I	18.5	590 m	multiple	2004–2019	29 Jul 2019	29	Disc.: Kitt Peak Obs.	MPC · JPL
0	2004 TA352	MBA-O	17.83	1.5 km	multiple	2004–2021	11 Nov 2021	31	Disc.: Kitt Peak Obs. Added on 22 July 2020	MPC · JPL
0	2004 TE352	MBA-O	17.63	1.7 km	multiple	2004–2021	07 Nov 2021	27	Disc.: Kitt Peak; Added on 5 November 2021	MPC · JPL
0	2004 TS352	MBA-M	18.4	880 m	multiple	2002–2021	15 Sep 2021	29	Disc.: Kitt Peak; Added on 29 January 2022	MPC · JPL
0	2004 TZ352	MBA-O	17.7	1.6 km	multiple	2004–2021	11 Nov 2021	26	Disc.: Kitt Peak; Added on 29 January 2022	MPC · JPL
0	2004 TA353	MBA-M	18.3	650 m	multiple	2004–2020	20 Jun 2020	39	Disc.: Kitt Peak; Added on 21 August 2021; Alt.: 2015 FE217	MPC · JPL
1	2004 TB353	MBA-I	19.5	370 m	multiple	2004–2019	26 Sep 2019	19	Disc.: Kitt Peak Obs.	MPC · JPL
1	2004 TK353	MBA-O	18.0	1.4 km	multiple	2004–2021	11 Jan 2021	23	Disc.: Kitt Peak; Added on 11 May 2021	MPC · JPL
0	2004 TY353	MBA-O	17.7	1.6 km	multiple	2004–2018	15 Oct 2018	48	Disc.: Kitt Peak Obs.	MPC · JPL
0	2004 TN354	MBA-O	17.83	1.5 km	multiple	2004–2022	07 Jan 2022	46	Disc.: Kitt Peak Obs. Added on 19 October 2020	MPC · JPL
E	2004 TU357	TNO	8.0	140 km	single	50 days	10 Nov 2004	8	Disc.: Kitt Peak Obs. LoUTNOs, centaur	MPC · JPL
E	2004 TW357	TNO	7.8	130 km	single	25 days	09 Nov 2004	4	Disc.: Kitt Peak Obs. LoUTNOs, plutino?	MPC · JPL
3	2004 TX357	TNO	8.66	67 km	multiple	1999–2021	11 Jan 2021	30	Disc.: Kitt Peak Obs. LoUTNOs, res · 3:4, BR-mag: 1.55; taxonomy: IR	MPC · JPL
E	2004 TB358	TNO	7.1	130 km	single	34 days	18 Nov 2004	4	Disc.: Kitt Peak Obs. LoUTNOs, cubewano?	MPC · JPL
1	2004 TB359	MBA-I	19.2	430 m	multiple	2004–2021	27 Sep 2021	46	Disc.: Spacewatch	MPC · JPL
1	2004 TM362	MBA-M	19.1	450 m	multiple	2004–2020	24 Oct 2020	32	Disc.: Spacewatch; Added on 5 November 2021	MPC · JPL
1	2004 TQ364	MBA-I	18.3	650 m	multiple	2000–2020	17 Dec 2020	32	Disc.: Spacewatch	MPC · JPL
0	2004 TU365	MBA-I	18.8	520 m	multiple	2004–2015	07 Nov 2015	26	Disc.: MLS	MPC · JPL
0	2004 TH370	MBA-O	17.58	1.7 km	multiple	2004–2021	07 Nov 2021	69	Disc.: Spacewatch; Alt.: 2010 VL118	MPC · JPL
1	2004 TT370	MBA-O	18.2	1.3 km	multiple	2004–2020	21 Oct 2020	63	Disc.: LPL/Spacewatch II; Added on 19 October 2020	MPC · JPL
0	2004 TW375	MBA-I	18.1	710 m	multiple	2004–2019	19 Dec 2019	73	Disc.: Spacewatch	MPC · JPL
0	2004 TC377	MBA-I	17.9	780 m	multiple	2004–2019	09 Jul 2019	80	Disc.: Spacewatch	MPC · JPL
1	2004 TE377	MBA-M	19.0	470 m	multiple	2004–2020	05 Nov 2020	73	Disc.: Spacewatch	MPC · JPL
1	2004 TJ377	MBA-O	17.5	1.8 km	multiple	2004–2019	03 Oct 2019	45	Disc.: Spacewatch	MPC · JPL
0	2004 TK377	MBA-M	17.8	1.2 km	multiple	2004–2017	17 Nov 2017	38	Disc.: Kitt Peak Obs.	MPC · JPL
0	2004 TZ377	MBA-O	17.18	2.0 km	multiple	2004–2021	07 Nov 2021	75	Disc.: Kitt Peak Obs. Alt.: 2010 OS65	MPC · JPL
0	2004 TC378	MBA-M	17.2	1.5 km	multiple	2004–2020	21 Jun 2020	38	Disc.: Kitt Peak Obs.	MPC · JPL
0	2004 TD378	MBA-M	17.65	1.6 km	multiple	2004–2021	17 May 2021	210	Disc.: Kitt Peak Obs.	MPC · JPL
1	2004 TO378	MBA-M	18.50	840 m	multiple	2004–2021	11 Sep 2021	45	Disc.: MLS	MPC · JPL
1	2004 TP378	MBA-M	17.7	860 m	multiple	2004–2020	15 Sep 2020	36	Disc.: Spacewatch	MPC · JPL
0	2004 TQ378	MBA-M	17.77	1.6 km	multiple	2004–2021	08 May 2021	35	Disc.: Spacewatch	MPC · JPL
0	2004 TS379	MBA-I	18.72	540 m	multiple	2004–2021	08 May 2021	60	Disc.: Kitt Peak Obs.	MPC · JPL
0	2004 TZ379	MBA-I	19.1	450 m	multiple	2004–2019	27 Oct 2019	47	Disc.: Spacewatch	MPC · JPL
0	2004 TC380	MBA-M	17.7	1.6 km	multiple	2004–2018	08 Nov 2018	48	Disc.: Spacewatch	MPC · JPL
0	2004 TG380	MBA-I	19.0	470 m	multiple	2004–2019	26 Oct 2019	44	Disc.: Spacewatch	MPC · JPL
1	2004 TM380	MBA-I	18.8	520 m	multiple	2004–2018	06 Oct 2018	41	Disc.: Kitt Peak Obs.	MPC · JPL
0	2004 TN380	MBA-I	19.2	430 m	multiple	2004–2019	26 Nov 2019	56	Disc.: MLS	MPC · JPL
0	2004 TP380	MBA-M	17.98	1.1 km	multiple	2004–2021	11 Oct 2021	48	Disc.: Kitt Peak Obs.	MPC · JPL
0	2004 TQ380	MBA-M	18.1	1.3 km	multiple	2004–2018	11 Nov 2018	45	Disc.: Spacewatch	MPC · JPL
1	2004 TS380	MCA	19.2	430 m	multiple	2004–2019	28 May 2019	45	Disc.: Kitt Peak Obs.	MPC · JPL
0	2004 TX380	MBA-I	19.0	470 m	multiple	2004–2019	28 Nov 2019	54	Disc.: Spacewatch; Alt.: 2013 AL177	MPC · JPL
0	2004 TG381	MBA-I	18.4	620 m	multiple	1993–2018	04 Oct 2018	46	Disc.: Spacewatch	MPC · JPL
1	2004 TM381	MBA-O	17.6	1.7 km	multiple	2004–2019	02 Nov 2019	41	Disc.: Spacewatch	MPC · JPL
1	2004 TN381	MBA-I	19.1	450 m	multiple	2004–2019	02 Nov 2019	39	Disc.: Spacewatch	MPC · JPL
0	2004 TP381	MBA-I	19.0	470 m	multiple	2004–2019	01 Nov 2019	36	Disc.: Spacewatch	MPC · JPL
1	2004 TQ381	MBA-O	17.7	1.6 km	multiple	1994–2019	02 Nov 2019	42	Disc.: Spacewatch	MPC · JPL
1	2004 TT381	MBA-I	19.1	450 m	multiple	2004–2018	13 Aug 2018	31	Disc.: Spacewatch	MPC · JPL
0	2004 TU381	MBA-M	18.45	610 m	multiple	2004–2021	28 Nov 2021	35	Disc.: Spacewatch	MPC · JPL
0	2004 TV381	MBA-M	17.31	1.0 km	multiple	2004–2021	01 Dec 2021	35	Disc.: NEAT	MPC · JPL
0	2004 TB382	MBA-I	19.2	430 m	multiple	2004–2019	27 Oct 2019	32	Disc.: Spacewatch	MPC · JPL
0	2004 TC382	MBA-I	19.2	430 m	multiple	2004–2019	26 Oct 2019	25	Disc.: Spacewatch	MPC · JPL
0	2004 TO382	MBA-I	18.4	620 m	multiple	2004–2019	27 Oct 2019	48	Disc.: Spacewatch	MPC · JPL
0	2004 TP382	MBA-I	18.9	490 m	multiple	2004–2019	04 Dec 2019	52	Disc.: Kitt Peak Obs.	MPC · JPL
0	2004 TS382	MBA-O	16.9	2.3 km	multiple	2004–2020	10 Aug 2020	38	Disc.: Kitt Peak Obs.	MPC · JPL
0	2004 TU382	MBA-I	19.3	410 m	multiple	2004–2019	04 Dec 2019	43	Disc.: Spacewatch	MPC · JPL
0	2004 TV382	MBA-M	18.72	760 m	multiple	2004–2021	30 Oct 2021	58	Disc.: Spacewatch	MPC · JPL
0	2004 TZ382	MBA-O	16.9	2.3 km	multiple	2004–2019	01 May 2019	33	Disc.: Kitt Peak Obs.	MPC · JPL
0	2004 TG383	MBA-O	17.3	1.9 km	multiple	2004–2019	03 Oct 2019	28	Disc.: Kitt Peak Obs.	MPC · JPL
0	2004 TR383	HIL	16.19	3.2 km	multiple	2004–2021	28 Nov 2021	46	Disc.: Kitt Peak Obs.	MPC · JPL
0	2004 TS383	MBA-I	18.2	680 m	multiple	2004–2021	15 Jan 2021	34	Disc.: Spacewatch	MPC · JPL
0	2004 TV383	MBA-I	18.7	540 m	multiple	2004–2018	03 Jun 2018	26	Disc.: Spacewatch	MPC · JPL
0	2004 TJ384	MBA-I	18.3	650 m	multiple	2004–2019	20 Dec 2019	40	Disc.: Spacewatch	MPC · JPL
1	2004 TK384	MBA-O	17.9	1.5 km	multiple	2004–2019	05 Nov 2019	35	Disc.: Spacewatch	MPC · JPL
0	2004 TM384	MBA-I	18.6	570 m	multiple	2004–2020	02 Feb 2020	50	Disc.: Spacewatch	MPC · JPL
0	2004 TR384	MBA-I	18.8	520 m	multiple	2004–2018	12 Nov 2018	41	Disc.: Kitt Peak Obs.	MPC · JPL
3	2004 TT384	MBA-I	18.5	590 m	multiple	2004–2019	06 Jul 2019	26	Disc.: Kitt Peak Obs.	MPC · JPL
1	2004 TD385	MBA-O	17.5	1.8 km	multiple	2004–2020	11 Oct 2020	43	Disc.: Kitt Peak Obs. Added on 19 October 2020	MPC · JPL
1	2004 TH385	MBA-O	17.5	1.8 km	multiple	2004–2020	15 Sep 2020	41	Disc.: LPL/Spacewatch II; Added on 19 October 2020	MPC · JPL
1	2004 TJ385	MBA-I	19.5	370 m	multiple	2004–2020	15 Oct 2020	59	Disc.: Spacewatch; Added on 19 October 2020	MPC · JPL
0	2004 TL385	MBA-I	18.6	570 m	multiple	2004–2017	28 Sep 2017	28	Disc.: Spacewatch; Added on 19 October 2020	MPC · JPL
0	2004 TM385	MBA-M	17.8	1.5 km	multiple	2004–2020	23 Jan 2020	38	Disc.: LPL/Spacewatch II; Added on 19 October 2020	MPC · JPL
0	2004 TN385	MBA-I	18.75	530 m	multiple	2004–2021	03 May 2021	33	Disc.: Spacewatch; Added on 19 October 2020	MPC · JPL
0	2004 TS385	MBA-I	19.4	390 m	multiple	2004–2020	25 Oct 2020	41	Disc.: LPL/Spacewatch II; Added on 17 January 2021	MPC · JPL
2	2004 TT385	MBA-O	18.3	1.2 km	multiple	2004–2021	06 Jan 2021	53	Disc.: Spacewatch; Added on 17 January 2021	MPC · JPL
0	2004 TW385	MBA-O	17.6	1.7 km	multiple	2004–2020	17 Oct 2020	31	Disc.: Spacewatch; Added on 17 January 2021	MPC · JPL
0	2004 TX385	MBA-M	18.1	1.3 km	multiple	2004–2019	08 Jan 2019	33	Disc.: Spacewatch; Added on 17 January 2021	MPC · JPL
3	2004 TY385	MBA-O	17.8	1.5 km	multiple	2004–2020	08 Oct 2020	33	Disc.: Spacewatch; Added on 17 January 2021	MPC · JPL
0	2004 TC386	HUN	19.1	450 m	multiple	2004–2020	20 Oct 2020	22	Disc.: Spacewatch; Added on 17 January 2021	MPC · JPL
0	2004 TO386	MBA-M	18.0	1.4 km	multiple	2004–2018	11 Nov 2018	30	Disc.: MLS; Added on 3 March 2021	MPC · JPL
0	2004 TT386	MBA-M	18.37	1.2 km	multiple	2004–2021	08 Aug 2021	27	Disc.: Kitt Peak; Added on 21 August 2021	MPC · JPL
0	2004 TV386	MBA-O	17.84	1.5 km	multiple	2004–2019	28 Aug 2019	30	Disc.: MLS; Added on 21 August 2021	MPC · JPL
0	2004 TW386	MBA-M	18.82	720 m	multiple	2004–2021	30 Nov 2021	57	Disc.: Spacewatch; Added on 21 August 2021	MPC · JPL
1	2004 TX386	MBA-I	19.23	420 m	multiple	2003–2021	11 Sep 2021	22	Disc.: Kitt Peak Obs. Added on 21 August 2021	MPC · JPL
0	2004 TY386	MBA-I	19.1	450 m	multiple	2004–2020	25 Jan 2020	24	Disc.: Spacewatch; Added on 24 December 2021	MPC · JPL
0	2004 TD387	MBA-O	16.82	2.4 km	multiple	2004–2021	30 Nov 2021	84	Disc.: Spacewatch; Added on 5 November 2021	MPC · JPL
2	2004 TF387	MBA-O	17.63	1.7 km	multiple	2004–2021	30 Oct 2021	39	Disc.: Spacewatch; Added on 5 November 2021	MPC · JPL
0	2004 TN387	MBA-O	17.43	1.8 km	multiple	2004–2021	28 Nov 2021	56	Disc.: Spacewatch; Added on 24 December 2021	MPC · JPL
0	2004 TP387	MBA-I	18.7	540 m	multiple	2004–2015	13 Dec 2015	18	Disc.: Spacewatch; Added on 24 December 2021	MPC · JPL
1	2004 TQ387	MBA-M	19.08	640 m	multiple	2004–2017	16 Sep 2017	22	Disc.: Spacewatch; Added on 24 December 2021	MPC · JPL
2	2004 TR387	MCA	19.41	390 m	multiple	2004–2007	05 Nov 2007	20	Disc.: Spacewatch; Added on 24 December 2021	MPC · JPL
0	2004 TS387	MBA-O	17.5	1.8 km	multiple	2004–2021	24 Nov 2021	33	Disc.: Spacewatch; Added on 24 December 2021	MPC · JPL
0	2004 TT387	MBA-I	19.17	440 m	multiple	2004–2021	08 Sep 2021	33	Disc.: Kitt Peak; Added on 24 December 2021	MPC · JPL
1	2004 TU387	MBA-M	18.5	840 m	multiple	2004–2021	02 Dec 2021	25	Disc.: Spacewatch; Added on 24 December 2021	MPC · JPL

back to top
