= List of unnumbered trans-Neptunian objects: 2004 =

The following is a partial list of unnumbered trans-Neptunian objects for principal designations assigned within 2004. As of October 2026, it contains a total of 140 bodies. For more information see the description on the main page. Also see list for the previous and next year.

== 2004 ==
| Designation | First observed (discovered) | | D (km) | Orbital description | | | | | | Remarks | Refs |
| Designation | Date | Observer (site) | D (km) | Class | a (AU) | e | i (°) | q (AU) | Q (AU) | Remarks | Refs |
|---|---|---|---|---|---|---|---|---|---|---|---|
| 2004 BZ_{159} | 21 January 2004 | Cerro Paranal (309) | 0.9 | damocloid | 45.5 | 0.96 | 4 | 1.9 | 89.0 | albedo: 0.048 | MPC · JPL |
| 2004 CM_{111} | 13 February 2004 | Spacewatch (691) | 8 | centaur | 34.8 | 0.86 | 5 | 4.9 | 64.7 | albedo: 0.058 | MPC · JPL |
| 2004 DF_{77} | 27 February 2004 | Kitt Peak (695) | 136 | cubewano (hot)? | 43.4 | 0.00 | 44 | 43.4 | 43.4 | albedo: 0.079 | MPC · JPL |
| 2004 DG_{64} | 22 February 2004 | M. W. Buie (695) | 113 | cubewano (cold)? | 43.3 | 0.03 | 3 | 41.9 | 44.6 | albedo: 0.152 | MPC · JPL |
| 2004 DG_{77} | 27 February 2004 | M. W. Buie (695) | 164 | cubewano (hot)? | 43.8 | 0.13 | 48 | 38.2 | 49.3 | albedo: 0.079 | MPC · JPL |
| 2004 DH_{64} | 26 February 2004 | M. W. Buie (695) | 218 | cubewano (cold) | 46.6 | 0.09 | 4 | 42.5 | 50.8 | albedo: 0.152 | MPC · JPL |
| 2004 DK_{64} | 26 February 2004 | Kitt Peak (695) | 157 | cubewano (hot)? | 43.7 | 0.10 | 19 | 39.3 | 48.0 | albedo: 0.079 | MPC · JPL |
| 2004 DK_{71} | 27 February 2004 | Kitt Peak (695) | 164 | cubewano (hot)? | 44.3 | 0.09 | 6 | 40.4 | 48.3 | albedo: 0.079 | MPC · JPL |
| 2004 DL_{64} | 26 February 2004 | Kitt Peak (695) | 136 | cubewano (cold)? | 45.4 | 0.06 | 1 | 42.7 | 48.0 | albedo: 0.152 | MPC · JPL |
| 2004 DL_{71} | 27 February 2004 | M. W. Buie (695) | 117 | cubewano (cold)? | 45.0 | 0.09 | 2 | 41.0 | 49.0 | albedo: 0.152 | MPC · JPL |
| 2004 DM_{64} | 26 February 2004 | M. W. Buie (695) | 143 | cubewano (cold) | 44.9 | 0.13 | 4 | 38.9 | 51.0 | albedo: 0.152 | MPC · JPL |
| 2004 DM_{71} | 27 February 2004 | M. W. Buie (695) | 101 | cubewano (cold) | 43.1 | 0.04 | 2 | 41.6 | 44.6 | albedo: 0.152 | MPC · JPL |
| 2004 DN_{64} | 26 February 2004 | Kitt Peak (695) | 103 | cubewano (cold) | 43.8 | 0.04 | 2 | 42.1 | 45.5 | albedo: 0.152 | MPC · JPL |
| 2004 EG_{96} | 14 March 2004 | M. W. Buie (695) | 89 | res · 2:5 | 55.3 | 0.42 | 16 | 32.0 | 78.6 | albedo: 0.126; BRmag: 1.39; taxonomy: BR-IR | MPC · JPL |
| 2004 EJ_{96} | 15 March 2004 | M. W. Buie (695) | 123 | plutino | 39.4 | 0.24 | 9 | 30.1 | 48.8 | albedo: 0.074 | MPC · JPL |
| 2004 EO_{95} | 14 March 2004 | M. W. Buie (695) | 205 | cubewano (cold)? | 42.1 | 0.11 | 3 | 37.5 | 46.8 | albedo: 0.152 | MPC · JPL |
| 2004 EP_{95} | 14 March 2004 | M. W. Buie (695) | 180 | cubewano (hot) | 43.4 | 0.02 | 10 | 42.5 | 44.3 | albedo: 0.079 | MPC · JPL |
| 2004 EQ_{95} | 15 March 2004 | M. W. Buie (695) | 93 | cubewano (cold)? | 46.0 | 0.11 | 5 | 40.8 | 51.2 | albedo: 0.152 | MPC · JPL |
| 2004 ER_{95} | 15 March 2004 | Kitt Peak (695) | 187 | cubewano (cold)? | 44.5 | 0.16 | 3 | 37.4 | 51.6 | albedo: 0.152 | MPC · JPL |
| 2004 ES_{95} | 15 March 2004 | M. W. Buie (695) | 147 | cubewano (cold) | 45.2 | 0.14 | 4 | 39.0 | 51.4 | albedo: 0.152 | MPC · JPL |
| 2004 ET_{95} | 15 March 2004 | Kitt Peak (695) | 118 | cubewano (cold)? | 43.8 | 0.04 | 2 | 42.1 | 45.5 | albedo: 0.152 | MPC · JPL |
| 2004 EV_{95} | 15 March 2004 | M. W. Buie (695) | 159 | plutino | 39.4 | 0.19 | 12 | 32.0 | 46.8 | albedo: 0.074 | MPC · JPL |
| 2004 FW_{164} | 20 March 2004 | Maunakea (568) | 129 | plutino | 39.4 | 0.16 | 9 | 33.2 | 45.6 | albedo: 0.074 | MPC · JPL |
| 2004 HA_{79} | 26 April 2004 | Canada-France Ecliptic Plane Survey (568) | 200 | plutino | 39.3 | 0.25 | 23 | 29.6 | 49.0 | albedo: 0.074 | MPC · JPL |
| 2004 HB_{79} | 26 April 2004 | Canada-France Ecliptic Plane Survey (568) | 79 | plutino | 39.1 | 0.23 | 3 | 30.3 | 47.9 | albedo: 0.074 | MPC · JPL |
| 2004 HC_{79} | 22 April 2004 | B. Gladman (568) | 128 | cubewano (cold) | 46.2 | 0.16 | 1 | 38.9 | 53.5 | albedo: 0.152 | MPC · JPL |
| 2004 HD_{79} | 22 April 2004 | B. Gladman (568) | 238 | cubewano (cold) | 45.8 | 0.03 | 1 | 44.3 | 47.3 | binary: 154 km; albedo: 0.152 | MPC · JPL |
| 2004 HE_{79} | 24 April 2004 | B. Gladman (568) | 107 | cubewano (cold) | 44.1 | 0.10 | 3 | 39.9 | 48.4 | possible binary; albedo: 0.152 | MPC · JPL |
| 2004 HG_{79} | 24 April 2004 | B. Gladman (568) | 147 | cubewano (cold) | 44.0 | 0.02 | 4 | 43.1 | 45.0 | possible binary; albedo: 0.152 | MPC · JPL |
| 2004 HH_{79} | 24 April 2004 | B. Gladman (568) | 195 | cubewano (hot) | 43.1 | 0.06 | 9 | 40.7 | 45.5 | albedo: 0.079 | MPC · JPL |
| 2004 HK_{79} | 26 April 2004 | B. Gladman (568) | 142 | cubewano (cold) | 43.8 | 0.08 | 2 | 40.4 | 47.1 | binary: 100 km; albedo: 0.152 | MPC · JPL |
| 2004 HL_{79} | 26 April 2004 | B. Gladman (568) | 142 | cubewano (hot)? | 42.0 | 0.08 | 17 | 38.9 | 45.2 | albedo: 0.079 | MPC · JPL |
| 2004 HM_{79} | 26 April 2004 | Canada-France Ecliptic Plane Survey (568) | 106 | res · 3:4 | 36.4 | 0.08 | 1 | 33.4 | 39.4 | albedo: 0.126; BRmag: 1.29; taxonomy: BR | MPC · JPL |
| 2004 HO_{79} | 22 April 2004 | Canada-France Ecliptic Plane Survey (568) | 130 | res · 2:5 | 55.0 | 0.41 | 6 | 32.3 | 77.7 | albedo: 0.126; BRmag: 1.52; taxonomy: IR-RR | MPC · JPL |
| 2004 HQ_{79} | 26 April 2004 | Canada-France Ecliptic Plane Survey (568) | 104 | SDO | 63.0 | 0.42 | 7 | 36.5 | 89.6 | albedo: 0.124 | MPC · JPL |
| 2004 HX_{78} | 24 April 2004 | Canada-France Ecliptic Plane Survey (568) | 120 | plutino | 39.3 | 0.15 | 16 | 33.4 | 45.1 | albedo: 0.074 | MPC · JPL |
| 2004 HY_{78} | 26 April 2004 | Canada-France Ecliptic Plane Survey (568) | 100 | plutino | 39.2 | 0.19 | 13 | 31.6 | 46.8 | albedo: 0.074 | MPC · JPL |
| 2004 HZ_{78} | 26 April 2004 | Canada-France Ecliptic Plane Survey (568) | 165 | plutino | 39.4 | 0.15 | 13 | 33.6 | 45.3 | albedo: 0.074 | MPC · JPL |
| 2004 KB_{19} | 24 May 2004 | Canada-France Ecliptic Plane Survey (568) | 154 | plutino | 39.3 | 0.22 | 17 | 30.8 | 47.9 | binary: 112 km; albedo: 0.074 | MPC · JPL |
| 2004 KC_{19} | 24 May 2004 | Canada-France Ecliptic Plane Survey (568) | 107 | plutino | 39.1 | 0.23 | 6 | 30.0 | 48.2 | albedo: 0.074 | MPC · JPL |
| 2004 KD_{19} | 24 May 2004 | B. Gladman (568) | 122 | other TNO | 38.1 | 0.02 | 2 | 37.3 | 38.9 | albedo: 0.13 | MPC · JPL |
| 2004 KE_{19} | 24 May 2004 | B. Gladman (568) | 171 | cubewano (cold) | 44.2 | 0.05 | 1 | 42.0 | 46.4 | binary: 100 km; albedo: 0.152 | MPC · JPL |
| 2004 KF_{19} | 24 May 2004 | B. Gladman (568) | 142 | cubewano (cold) | 43.9 | 0.06 | 0 | 41.3 | 46.6 | albedo: 0.152 | MPC · JPL |
| 2004 KG_{19} | 24 May 2004 | B. Gladman (568) | 113 | cubewano (cold) | 43.1 | 0.02 | 1 | 42.2 | 44.0 | possible binary; albedo: 0.152 | MPC · JPL |
| 2004 KH_{19} | 24 May 2004 | B. Gladman (568) | 200 | other TNO | 40.7 | 0.12 | 35 | 35.8 | 45.6 | binary: 113 km; albedo: 0.13 | MPC · JPL |
| 2004 KJ_{19} | 24 May 2004 | B. Gladman (568) | 184 | cubewano (hot)? | 46.8 | 0.23 | 25 | 35.9 | 57.6 | albedo: 0.079 | MPC · JPL |
| 2004 KK_{19} | 24 May 2004 | Canada-France Ecliptic Plane Survey (568) | 136 | res · 3:5? | 42.3 | 0.15 | 5 | 36.1 | 48.4 | albedo: 0.126 | MPC · JPL |
| 2004 KL_{19} | 24 May 2004 | Canada-France Ecliptic Plane Survey (568) | 68 | twotino | 47.4 | 0.32 | 6 | 32.2 | 62.6 | albedo: 0.126 | MPC · JPL |
| 2004 KM_{19} | 24 May 2004 | Canada-France Ecliptic Plane Survey (568) | 86 | twotino | 47.5 | 0.29 | 2 | 33.7 | 61.2 | albedo: 0.126 | MPC · JPL |
| 2004 KZ_{18} | 24 May 2004 | P. A. Wiegert, A. Papadimos (568) | 78 | res · 2:5 | 55.1 | 0.38 | 23 | 34.2 | 76.0 | albedo: 0.126 | MPC · JPL |
| 2004 LA_{33} | 9 June 2004 | Maunakea (568) | 83 | other TNO | 34.2 | 0.10 | 7 | 30.7 | 37.7 | albedo: 0.13 | MPC · JPL |
| 2004 LB_{33} | 9 June 2004 | Maunakea (568) | 110 | centaur | 33.1 | 0.22 | 5 | 25.7 | 40.5 | albedo: 0.058 | MPC · JPL |
| 2004 LC_{33} | 9 June 2004 | Maunakea (568) | 124 | cubewano (hot)? | 43.2 | 0.09 | 38 | 39.3 | 47.1 | albedo: 0.079 | MPC · JPL |
| 2004 LD_{33} | 9 June 2004 | Maunakea (568) | 97 | plutino? | 39.2 | 0.20 | 15 | 31.4 | 47.1 | albedo: 0.074 | MPC · JPL |
| 2004 LE_{33} | 9 June 2004 | Maunakea (568) | 97 | centaur | 32.3 | 0.20 | 6 | 25.8 | 38.9 | albedo: 0.058 | MPC · JPL |
| 2004 LT_{32} | 9 June 2004 | Maunakea (568) | 154 | other TNO | 44.4 | 0.13 | 3 | 38.8 | 50.1 | albedo: 0.13 | MPC · JPL |
| 2004 LU_{32} | 9 June 2004 | Maunakea (568) | 65 | cubewano (cold)? | 44.8 | 0.10 | 2 | 40.2 | 49.5 | albedo: 0.152 | MPC · JPL |
| 2004 LV_{31} | 9 June 2004 | M. W. Buie (568) | 82 | cubewano (hot)? | 219.0 | 0.90 | 7 | 22.6 | 415.4 | albedo: 0.079 | MPC · JPL |
| 2004 LV_{32} | 9 June 2004 | Maunakea (568) | 60 | other TNO | 41.7 | 0.19 | 18 | 34.0 | 49.5 | albedo: 0.13 | MPC · JPL |
| 2004 LW_{31} | 9 June 2004 | M. W. Buie (568) | 136 | cubewano (cold) | 46.3 | 0.08 | 3 | 42.6 | 50.0 | albedo: 0.152 | MPC · JPL |
| 2004 LW_{32} | 9 June 2004 | Maunakea (568) | 90 | SDO | 54.5 | 0.41 | 3 | 32.2 | 76.8 | albedo: 0.124 | MPC · JPL |
| 2004 LX_{32} | 9 June 2004 | Maunakea (568) | 125 | centaur | 65.6 | 0.78 | 5 | 14.4 | 116.9 | albedo: 0.058 | MPC · JPL |
| 2004 LY_{32} | 9 June 2004 | Maunakea (568) | 188 | other TNO | 38.3 | 0.10 | 17 | 34.4 | 42.3 | albedo: 0.13 | MPC · JPL |
| 2004 LZ_{32} | 9 June 2004 | Maunakea (568) | 97 | other TNO | 49.1 | 0.42 | 9 | 28.3 | 69.8 | albedo: 0.13 | MPC · JPL |
| 2004 MK_{10} | 22 June 2004 | Maunakea (568) | 138 | centaur | 85.5 | 0.68 | 9 | 27.0 | 143.9 | albedo: 0.058 | MPC · JPL |
| 2004 MM_{10} | 23 June 2004 | Maunakea (568) | 133 | other TNO | 41.9 | 0.37 | 1 | 26.3 | 57.5 | albedo: 0.13 | MPC · JPL |
| 2004 MN_{10} | 16 June 2004 | Maunakea (568) | 118 | cubewano (hot)? | 39.9 | 0.06 | 6 | 37.6 | 42.2 | albedo: 0.079 | MPC · JPL |
| 2004 MO_{10} | 22 June 2004 | Maunakea (568) | 131 | centaur | 30.3 | 0.33 | 8 | 20.2 | 40.3 | albedo: 0.058 | MPC · JPL |
| 2004 MP_{10} | 24 June 2004 | Maunakea (568) | 123 | plutino? | 39.4 | 0.21 | 3 | 31.3 | 47.5 | albedo: 0.074 | MPC · JPL |
| 2004 MS_{8} | 24 June 2004 | Canada-France Ecliptic Plane Survey (568) | 107 | plutino | 39.3 | 0.30 | 12 | 27.7 | 50.8 | albedo: 0.074 | MPC · JPL |
| 2004 MT_{8} | 24 June 2004 | B. Gladman (568) | 159 | cubewano (cold) | 43.0 | 0.05 | 2 | 41.0 | 44.9 | albedo: 0.152 | MPC · JPL |
| 2004 MU_{8} | 24 June 2004 | B. Gladman (568) | 221 | cubewano (cold) | 44.7 | 0.08 | 4 | 41.0 | 48.5 | binary: 147 km; albedo: 0.152 | MPC · JPL |
| 2004 MV_{8} | 24 June 2004 | B. Gladman (568) | 212 | cubewano (hot)? | 47.1 | 0.17 | 27 | 39.0 | 55.2 | albedo: 0.079 | MPC · JPL |
| 2004 NN_{8} | 13 July 2004 | Siding Spring Survey (E12) | 5 | damocloid | 98.5 | 0.98 | 166 | 2.3 | 194.7 | albedo: 0.048 | MPC · JPL |
| 2004 OJ_{14} | 17 July 2004 | M. W. Buie (807) | 198 | SDO | 55.2 | 0.29 | 23 | 39.1 | 71.2 | albedo: 0.124; BRmag: 1.42; taxonomy: IR | MPC · JPL |
| 2004 OL_{12} | 16 July 2004 | M. W. Buie (807) | 205 | cubewano (cold) | 44.5 | 0.08 | 3 | 40.8 | 48.2 | albedo: 0.152 | MPC · JPL |
| 2004 OL_{14} | 17 July 2004 | M. W. Buie (807) | 77 | other TNO | 48.7 | 0.30 | 21 | 33.9 | 63.4 | albedo: 0.13 | MPC · JPL |
| 2004 OP_{15} | 24 July 2004 | B. Gladman (568) | 165 | other TNO | 38.5 | 0.06 | 23 | 36.4 | 40.6 | albedo: 0.13 | MPC · JPL |
| 2004 OQ_{15} | 22 July 2004 | Canada-France Ecliptic Plane Survey (568) | 156 | res · 4:7 | 43.5 | 0.12 | 10 | 38.2 | 48.9 | albedo: 0.126; BRmag: 1.36; taxonomy: BR-IR | MPC · JPL |
| 2004 OS_{15} | 22 July 2004 | Canada-France Ecliptic Plane Survey (568) | 131 | SDO | 55.6 | 0.32 | 4 | 38.1 | 73.1 | albedo: 0.124 | MPC · JPL |
| 2004 PB_{108} | 14 August 2004 | M. W. Buie (807) | 241 | cubewano (hot)? | 45.2 | 0.11 | 20 | 40.1 | 50.2 | binary: 131 km; albedo: 0.035 | MPC · JPL |
| 2004 PC_{112} | 13 August 2004 | Cerro Tololo Observatory, La Serena (807) | 50 | cubewano (cold)? | 44.3 | 0.04 | 2 | 42.5 | 46.2 | albedo: 0.152 | MPC · JPL |
| 2004 PD_{112} | 13 August 2004 | M. W. Buie (807) | 261 | cubewano (hot)? | 46.6 | 0.19 | 8 | 37.5 | 55.6 | albedo: 0.079 | MPC · JPL |
| 2004 PE_{112} | 13 August 2004 | Cerro Tololo Observatory, La Serena (807) | 156 | cubewano (cold)? | 45.9 | 0.00 | 4 | 45.9 | 45.9 | albedo: 0.152 | MPC · JPL |
| 2004 PF_{112} | 14 August 2004 | M. W. Buie (807) | 157 | cubewano (cold)? | 46.8 | 0.11 | 2 | 41.8 | 51.8 | albedo: 0.152 | MPC · JPL |
| 2004 PS_{107} | 12 August 2004 | M. W. Buie (807) | 111 | other TNO | 48.0 | 0.24 | 25 | 36.4 | 59.6 | albedo: 0.13 | MPC · JPL |
| 2004 PT_{117} | 15 August 2004 | B. Gladman (568) | 147 | cubewano (cold) | 42.9 | 0.04 | 1 | 41.1 | 44.7 | binary: 81 km; albedo: 0.152 | MPC · JPL |
| 2004 PU_{107} | 13 August 2004 | Cerro Tololo Observatory, La Serena (807) | 156 | cubewano (cold)? | 45.0 | 0.03 | 5 | 43.5 | 46.5 | albedo: 0.152 | MPC · JPL |
| 2004 PU_{117} | 15 August 2004 | B. Gladman (568) | 141 | cubewano (cold) | 42.7 | 0.01 | 2 | 42.2 | 43.3 | albedo: 0.152 | MPC · JPL |
| 2004 PV_{107} | 13 August 2004 | Cerro Tololo Observatory, La Serena (807) | 312 | cubewano (hot)? | 44.7 | 0.13 | 32 | 39.0 | 50.5 | albedo: 0.079 | MPC · JPL |
| 2004 PV_{117} | 15 August 2004 | B. Gladman (568) | 165 | cubewano (cold) | 46.0 | 0.15 | 4 | 39.0 | 52.9 | binary: 66 km; albedo: 0.152 | MPC · JPL |
| 2004 PW_{117} | 15 August 2004 | B. Gladman (568) | 183 | cubewano (cold) | 43.5 | 0.06 | 2 | 40.8 | 46.3 | binary: 107 km; albedo: 0.152 | MPC · JPL |
| 2004 PX_{107} | 14 August 2004 | M. W. Buie (807) | 119 | cubewano (cold) | 43.5 | 0.05 | 3 | 41.2 | 45.7 | albedo: 0.152 | MPC · JPL |
| 2004 PX_{117} | 15 August 2004 | B. Gladman (568) | 170 | cubewano (cold) | 44.2 | 0.10 | 4 | 39.7 | 48.6 | binary: 107 km; albedo: 0.152 | MPC · JPL |
| 2004 PY_{111} | 12 August 2004 | Cerro Tololo Observatory, La Serena (807) | 226 | cubewano (hot)? | 44.3 | 0.08 | 10 | 40.6 | 48.1 | albedo: 0.079 | MPC · JPL |
| 2004 PZ_{107} | 14 August 2004 | M. W. Buie (807) | 134 | cubewano (hot)? | 45.7 | 0.19 | 11 | 37.2 | 54.2 | albedo: 0.079 | MPC · JPL |
| 2004 PZ_{111} | 12 August 2004 | Cerro Tololo Observatory, La Serena (807) | 180 | cubewano (hot)? | 43.6 | 0.12 | 5 | 38.2 | 49.0 | albedo: 0.079 | MPC · JPL |
| 2004 QE_{29} | 19 August 2004 | B. Gladman (568) | 152 | cubewano (hot)? | 40.9 | 0.08 | 24 | 37.5 | 44.2 | albedo: 0.079 | MPC · JPL |
| 2004 QG_{29} | 19 August 2004 | Canada-France Ecliptic Plane Survey (568) | 98 | other TNO | 48.4 | 0.23 | 27 | 37.1 | 59.7 | albedo: 0.13 | MPC · JPL |
| 2004 QH_{29} | 19 August 2004 | Canada-France Ecliptic Plane Survey (568) | 134 | other TNO | 50.8 | 0.23 | 12 | 39.3 | 62.3 | albedo: 0.13 | MPC · JPL |
| 2004 SC_{60} | 22 September 2004 | H. G. Roe, M. E. Brown, K. M. Barkume (675) | 136 | res · 4:7 | 43.9 | 0.27 | 1 | 32.1 | 55.7 | binary: 87 km; albedo: 0.126 | MPC · JPL |
| 2004 TB_{358} | 15 October 2004 | Kitt Peak (695) | 130 | cubewano (cold)? | 43.8 | 0.07 | 2 | 40.6 | 47.1 | albedo: 0.152 | MPC · JPL |
| 2004 TE_{282} | 15 October 2004 | M. W. Buie (695) | 117 | centaur | 34.7 | 0.16 | 21 | 29.1 | 40.4 | albedo: 0.058 | MPC · JPL |
| 2004 TU_{357} | 15 October 2004 | M. W. Buie (695) | 139 | centaur | 40.2 | 0.29 | 7 | 28.7 | 51.7 | albedo: 0.058 | MPC · JPL |
| 2004 TW_{357} | 15 October 2004 | Kitt Peak (695) | 135 | plutino? | 39.5 | 0.19 | 32 | 32.0 | 47.0 | albedo: 0.074 | MPC · JPL |
| 2004 TX_{357} | 15 October 2004 | M. W. Buie (695) | 69 | res · 3:4 | 36.9 | 0.22 | 16 | 28.9 | 44.9 | albedo: 0.126; BRmag: 1.55; taxonomy: IR | MPC · JPL |
| 2004 UD_{10} | 18 October 2004 | M. W. Buie (695) | 155 | cubewano (cold) | 43.1 | 0.03 | 4 | 41.8 | 44.4 | albedo: 0.152 | MPC · JPL |
| 2004 UE_{10} | 18 October 2004 | Kitt Peak (695) | 141 | plutino? | 39.4 | 0.11 | 19 | 34.9 | 44.0 | albedo: 0.074 | MPC · JPL |
| 2004 UF_{10} | 18 October 2004 | Kitt Peak (695) | 135 | plutino? | 39.4 | 0.13 | 5 | 34.3 | 44.5 | albedo: 0.074 | MPC · JPL |
| 2004 US_{10} | 17 October 2004 | C. A. Trujillo, S. S. Sheppard (304) | 67 | plutino | 39.8 | 0.22 | 10 | 30.9 | 48.6 | albedo: 0.074 | MPC · JPL |
| 2004 UT_{10} | 17 October 2004 | Las Campanas Observatory (304) | 147 | other TNO | 47.9 | 0.28 | 15 | 34.6 | 61.1 | albedo: 0.13 | MPC · JPL |
| 2004 UU_{10} | 17 October 2004 | Las Campanas Observatory (304) | 59 | cubewano (cold)? | 45.9 | 0.00 | 2 | 45.9 | 45.9 | albedo: 0.152 | MPC · JPL |
| 2004 UW_{10} | 17 October 2004 | Las Campanas Observatory (304) | 39 | plutino? | 39.5 | 0.25 | 5 | 29.6 | 49.3 | albedo: 0.074 | MPC · JPL |
| 2004 VA_{76} | 9 November 2004 | M. W. Buie (695) | 150 | cubewano (cold)? | 42.7 | 0.10 | 1 | 38.4 | 47.0 | albedo: 0.152 | MPC · JPL |
| 2004 VD_{131} | 9 November 2004 | B. Gladman (568) | 163 | cubewano (cold) | 46.7 | 0.13 | 4 | 40.6 | 52.7 | binary: 103 km; albedo: 0.152 | MPC · JPL |
| 2004 VE_{131} | 9 November 2004 | Canada-France Ecliptic Plane Survey (568) | 113 | res · 3:5 | 42.6 | 0.26 | 5 | 31.4 | 53.8 | contact binary; albedo: 0.126 | MPC · JPL |
| 2004 VF_{131} | 9 November 2004 | Canada-France Ecliptic Plane Survey (568) | 163 | res · 4:7 | 43.9 | 0.21 | 1 | 34.6 | 53.1 | albedo: 0.126 | MPC · JPL |
| 2004 VG_{131} | 9 November 2004 | Canada-France Ecliptic Plane Survey (568) | 79 | SDO | 64.9 | 0.51 | 14 | 31.7 | 98.2 | albedo: 0.124 | MPC · JPL |
| 2004 VH_{131} | 9 November 2004 | Canada-France Ecliptic Plane Survey (568) | 63 | centaur | 60.5 | 0.63 | 12 | 22.4 | 98.7 | albedo: 0.058 | MPC · JPL |
| 2004 VK_{78} | 11 November 2004 | M. W. Buie (695) | 97 | twotino | 48.1 | 0.33 | 2 | 32.1 | 64.1 | albedo: 0.126 | MPC · JPL |
| 2004 VL_{78} | 11 November 2004 | M. W. Buie (695) | 79 | SDO | 62.0 | 0.53 | 16 | 29.2 | 94.7 | albedo: 0.124 | MPC · JPL |
| 2004 VM_{131} | 9 November 2004 | Canada-France Ecliptic Plane Survey (568) | 115 | centaur | 69.2 | 0.70 | 14 | 20.8 | 117.6 | albedo: 0.058 | MPC · JPL |
| 2004 VM_{78} | 11 November 2004 | M. W. Buie (695) | 241 | cubewano (hot)? | 41.4 | 0.10 | 35 | 37.5 | 45.4 | albedo: 0.079 | MPC · JPL |
| 2004 VN_{78} | 11 November 2004 | Kitt Peak (695) | 93 | other TNO | 39.4 | 0.18 | 3 | 32.3 | 46.4 | albedo: 0.13 | MPC · JPL |
| 2004 VU_{130} | 9 November 2004 | P. A. Wiegert, A. Papadimos (568) | 156 | res · 1:3 | 62.5 | 0.43 | 8 | 35.8 | 89.2 | albedo: 0.126 | MPC · JPL |
| 2004 VU_{131} | 9 November 2004 | B. Gladman (568) | 103 | cubewano (cold) | 45.8 | 0.10 | 1 | 41.2 | 50.5 | albedo: 0.152 | MPC · JPL |
| 2004 VU_{75} | 9 November 2004 | M. W. Buie (695) | 176 | res · 4:7? | 43.8 | 0.13 | 3 | 38.1 | 49.5 | binary; albedo: 0.126 | MPC · JPL |
| 2004 VV_{75} | 9 November 2004 | M. W. Buie (695) | 107 | centaur | 52.6 | 0.47 | 9 | 27.8 | 77.4 | albedo: 0.058 | MPC · JPL |
| 2004 VW_{75} | 9 November 2004 | M. W. Buie (695) | 89 | other TNO | 34.4 | 0.11 | 25 | 30.8 | 38.1 | albedo: 0.13 | MPC · JPL |
| 2004 VX_{130} | 9 November 2004 | Canada-France Ecliptic Plane Survey (568) | 127 | plutino | 39.7 | 0.21 | 6 | 31.5 | 47.9 | albedo: 0.074 | MPC · JPL |
| 2004 VX_{75} | 9 November 2004 | M. W. Buie (695) | 188 | cubewano (hot)? | 38.8 | 0.10 | 23 | 34.9 | 42.6 | albedo: 0.079 | MPC · JPL |
| 2004 VY_{130} | 9 November 2004 | Canada-France Ecliptic Plane Survey (568) | 119 | plutino | 39.7 | 0.28 | 10 | 28.5 | 50.8 | albedo: 0.074 | MPC · JPL |
| 2004 VY_{75} | 9 November 2004 | M. W. Buie (695) | 192 | cubewano (hot)? | 50.7 | 0.11 | 12 | 45.4 | 56.0 | albedo: 0.079 | MPC · JPL |
| 2004 VZ_{130} | 9 November 2004 | Canada-France Ecliptic Plane Survey (568) | 86 | plutino | 39.8 | 0.28 | 12 | 28.5 | 51.1 | albedo: 0.074 | MPC · JPL |
| 2004 VZ_{75} | 9 November 2004 | M. W. Buie (695) | 191 | plutino | 39.8 | 0.19 | 5 | 32.0 | 47.5 | albedo: 0.074 | MPC · JPL |
| 2004 XW_{186} | 12 December 2004 | Maunakea (568) | 62 | cubewano (cold)? | 45.7 | 0.05 | 1 | 43.6 | 47.7 | albedo: 0.152 | MPC · JPL |
| 2004 XX_{186} | 12 December 2004 | Maunakea (568) | 65 | cubewano (cold)? | 46.9 | 0.00 | 2 | 46.9 | 46.9 | albedo: 0.152 | MPC · JPL |
| 2004 XX_{190} | 11 December 2004 | Maunakea (568) | 142 | cubewano (cold) | 45.5 | 0.11 | 2 | 40.6 | 50.5 | albedo: 0.152 | MPC · JPL |
| 2004 XY_{186} | 12 December 2004 | S. S. Sheppard, D. C. Jewitt (568) | 57 | other TNO | 37.2 | 0.10 | 34 | 33.6 | 40.8 | albedo: 0.13 | MPC · JPL |
| 2004 XZ_{186} | 12 December 2004 | S. S. Sheppard, D. C. Jewitt (568) | 36 | other TNO | 38.9 | 0.11 | 10 | 34.7 | 43.0 | albedo: 0.13 | MPC · JPL |

back to top
