= List of unnumbered minor planets: 2004 G–H =

This is a partial list of unnumbered minor planets for principal provisional designations assigned during 1–30 April 2004. As of April 2026, a total of 110 bodies remain unnumbered for this period. Objects for this year are listed on the following pages: A–B · C · D–E · F · G–H · J–O · P–Q · R_{i} · R_{ii} · R_{iii} · S · T_{i} · T_{ii} · T_{iii} · T_{iv} · U–V · W–X and Y. Also see previous and next year.

Near-Earth obj.	MBA (inner)	MBA (outer)	Centaur
Mars-crosser	MBA (middle)	Jupiter trojan	Trans-Neptunian obj.
Unclassified

== G ==
U	Designation	Class	Physical		Observations				Description and notes	Ref
U	Designation	Class	H	D	Opp.	Arc	Last	Used	Description and notes	Ref
0	2004 GA	AMO	20.21	340 m	multiple	2004-2022	16 Dec 2022	191	—	MPC · JPL
6	2004 GD	APO	23.7	65 m	single	11 days	20 Apr 2004	66	—	MPC · JPL
5	2004 GB2	APO	21.0	220 m	single	45 days	23 May 2004	38	Potentially hazardous object	MPC · JPL
1	2004 GC2	MCA	20.23	330 m	multiple	2004-2025	21 Apr 2025	41	—	MPC · JPL
5	2004 GD2	AMO	24.3	49 m	single	20 days	02 May 2004	150	—	MPC · JPL
6	2004 GE2	APO	21.5	180 m	single	12 days	24 Apr 2004	93	Potentially hazardous object	MPC · JPL
0	2004 GJ5	MCA	19.2	430 m	multiple	2004–2020	31 Jan 2020	66	Alt.: 2017 ER21	MPC · JPL
0	2004 GH6	MBA-I	18.4	620 m	multiple	2004–2020	16 Aug 2020	38	Disc.: LPL/Spacewatch II; Added on 19 October 2020	MPC · JPL
0	2004 GJ6	MBA-I	19.27	420 m	multiple	2004–2021	09 Jul 2021	59	Disc.: LPL/Spacewatch II; Added on 17 June 2021	MPC · JPL
0	2004 GB7	MBA-O	17.7	1.6 km	multiple	2004–2021	08 Jun 2021	35	— Added on 22 July 2020; Alt.: 2015 FK318	MPC · JPL
0	2004 GJ10	MBA-I	18.5	590 m	multiple	2004–2020	13 Sep 2020	33	Alt.: 2015 BA486	MPC · JPL
0	2004 GK11	MCA	17.75	1.2 km	multiple	2004–2021	18 May 2021	110	—	MPC · JPL
7	2004 GZ14	APO	23.9	59 m	single	8 days	21 Apr 2004	58	—	MPC · JPL
7	2004 GB19	APO	23.0	89 m	single	21 days	06 May 2004	50	—	MPC · JPL
6	2004 GC19	APO	24.1	54 m	single	10 days	25 Apr 2004	47	—	MPC · JPL
1	2004 GY27	MCA	18.65	1.0 km	multiple	2004-2025	19 Oct 2025	50	—	MPC · JPL
1	2004 GB39	MBA-O	16.6	2.7 km	multiple	2004–2021	10 Mar 2021	49	Alt.: 2020 YR8	MPC · JPL
0	2004 GP45	MBA-O	17.4	1.8 km	multiple	2004–2018	23 Jan 2018	30	—	MPC · JPL
0	2004 GR45	MBA-I	18.58	570 m	multiple	2001–2020	13 Sep 2020	39	—	MPC · JPL
1	2004 GA46	MBA-M	17.2	1.1 km	multiple	2004–2020	17 Apr 2020	33	Alt.: 2008 GN126	MPC · JPL
4	2004 GA47	MBA-M	19.29	510 m	multiple	2004-2026	12 May 2026	30	—	MPC · JPL
1	2004 GR47	MBA-O	17.2	2.0 km	multiple	2004–2021	11 May 2021	47	Disc.: Spacewatch; Added on 11 May 2021; Alt.: 2021 EM21	MPC · JPL
–	2004 GZ48	MBA-I	18.9	490 m	single	13 days	25 Apr 2004	9	—	MPC · JPL
0	2004 GR49	MBA-M	17.67	800 m	multiple	2004-2024	01 Nov 2024	53	—	MPC · JPL
0	2004 GR51	MBA-M	18.27	930 m	multiple	2004–2021	19 Mar 2021	26	Disc.: Spacewatch; Added on 21 August 2021	MPC · JPL
3	2004 GP52	MBA-M	18.0	1.1 km	multiple	2004–2017	27 Mar 2017	19	Disc.: Spacewatch; Added on 21 August 2021	MPC · JPL
0	2004 GB53	MBA-I	18.6	570 m	multiple	2004–2021	18 Feb 2021	34	Disc.: Spacewatch; Added on 9 March 2021	MPC · JPL
0	2004 GC53	MBA-M	18.5	840 m	multiple	2004–2021	09 Apr 2021	31	—	MPC · JPL
1	2004 GR53	MBA-M	18.3	920 m	multiple	2004–2021	04 May 2021	24	Disc.: Spacewatch; Added on 17 June 2021	MPC · JPL
0	2004 GR54	MBA-I	19.2	430 m	multiple	2004–2015	17 Apr 2015	26	—	MPC · JPL
0	2004 GK55	MBA-I	18.9	490 m	multiple	2004–2020	13 Sep 2020	34	Alt.: 2015 BC314	MPC · JPL
0	2004 GA58	MBA-I	19.2	430 m	multiple	2004–2020	27 Jan 2020	34	—	MPC · JPL
1	2004 GK58	HUN	18.7	540 m	multiple	2004–2019	07 Apr 2019	47	Alt.: 2014 ET48	MPC · JPL
0	2004 GN58	MBA-M	18.3	920 m	multiple	2004–2021	03 May 2021	34	Disc.: LPL/Spacewatch II; Added on 11 May 2021; Alt.: 2021 FR19	MPC · JPL
0	2004 GX59	MBA-O	17.1	2.1 km	multiple	2004–2018	25 Jan 2018	20	—	MPC · JPL
0	2004 GP62	MBA-M	18.3	920 m	multiple	2004–2021	14 May 2021	39	Disc.: Spacewatch; Added on 21 August 2021; Alt.: 2017 MG20	MPC · JPL
0	2004 GT64	MBA-I	18.5	590 m	multiple	2004–2019	26 Sep 2019	40	—	MPC · JPL
0	2004 GE68	MBA-M	17.9	1.5 km	multiple	2004–2018	07 Aug 2018	38	—	MPC · JPL
2	2004 GF70	MBA-M	18.2	960 m	multiple	2004–2017	26 Apr 2017	16	—	MPC · JPL
0	2004 GE81	MBA-I	18.1	710 m	multiple	2004–2009	19 Sep 2009	25	Alt.: 2008 EG139	MPC · JPL
0	2004 GS88	MBA-M	17.9	1.5 km	multiple	2004–2019	26 Sep 2019	27	Disc.: VATT; Added on 17 June 2021	MPC · JPL
1	2004 GR90	MBA-M	17.7	1.2 km	multiple	2004–2017	27 Mar 2017	30	—	MPC · JPL
0	2004 GG91	MBA-I	18.5	590 m	multiple	2004–2019	27 Oct 2019	42	—	MPC · JPL
0	2004 GE92	MBA-I	18.9	490 m	multiple	2004–2018	13 Aug 2018	41	—	MPC · JPL
0	2004 GJ92	MBA-M	18.38	890 m	multiple	2004–2021	28 Jun 2021	83	Disc.: NEAT; Added on 11 May 2021	MPC · JPL

back to top

== H ==
U	Designation	Class	Physical		Observations				Description and notes	Ref
U	Designation	Class	H	D	Opp.	Arc	Last	Used	Description and notes	Ref
8	2004 HB	APO	23.9	59 m	single	2 days	18 Apr 2004	21	—	MPC · JPL
6	2004 HD	AMO	24.8	39 m	single	16 days	02 May 2004	73	—	MPC · JPL
6	2004 HE	APO	26.8	16 m	single	1 day	17 Apr 2004	40	—	MPC · JPL
6	2004 HL	APO	26.5	18 m	single	1 day	17 Apr 2004	25	AMO at MPC	MPC · JPL
0	2004 HM	APO	23.18	82 m	multiple	2004–2020	20 Oct 2020	132	—	MPC · JPL
3	2004 HZ	APO	22.6	110 m	multiple	2004–2007	22 Apr 2007	74	—	MPC · JPL
8	2004 HA1	APO	21.7	160 m	single	6 days	25 Apr 2004	65	—	MPC · JPL
6	2004 HQ1	APO	23.1	85 m	single	30 days	19 May 2004	64	—	MPC · JPL
0	2004 HA2	MCA	20.12	280 m	multiple	2004-2023	10 Apr 2023	54	—	MPC · JPL
7	2004 HD2	APO	21.1	210 m	single	20 days	10 May 2004	53	Potentially hazardous object	MPC · JPL
0	2004 HS3	MBA-M	18.0	1.1 km	multiple	2004–2019	27 Oct 2019	36	Alt.: 2008 CX147	MPC · JPL
7	2004 HF12	APO	20.5	280 m	single	48 days	07 Jun 2004	72	Potentially hazardous object	MPC · JPL
9	2004 HG12	APO	22.4	120 m	single	14 days	04 May 2004	53	—	MPC · JPL
8	2004 HH20	AMO	25.1	34 m	single	9 days	30 Apr 2004	44	—	MPC · JPL
1	2004 HJ22	MBA-M	18.5	840 m	multiple	2004–2017	19 Mar 2017	20	—	MPC · JPL
0	2004 HY22	MBA-I	19.0	470 m	multiple	2004–2019	21 Aug 2019	29	—	MPC · JPL
1	2004 HD31	MBA-M	18.68	770 m	multiple	2004–2021	31 May 2021	37	Disc.: Spacewatch; Added on 17 June 2021	MPC · JPL
6	2004 HC33	APO	26.0	22 m	single	4 days	27 Apr 2004	33	AMO at MPC	MPC · JPL
7	2004 HT38	AMO	23.6	68 m	single	6 days	30 Apr 2004	38	—	MPC · JPL
1	2004 HA39	APO	20.96	230 m	multiple	2004-2023	23 Oct 2023	90	CSS	MPC · JPL
5	2004 HB39	AMO	22.7	100 m	single	91 days	25 Jul 2004	46	—	MPC · JPL
2	2004 HC39	APO	21.5	180 m	single	20 days	12 May 2004	125	Potentially hazardous object	MPC · JPL
0	2004 HZ52	MBA-M	16.72	1.9 km	multiple	2004–2021	01 Apr 2021	233	—	MPC · JPL
1	2004 HW53	APO	19.7	410 m	multiple	2004–2019	26 Oct 2019	52	—	MPC · JPL
0	2004 HX53	APO	23.6	68 m	multiple	2004–2017	04 Apr 2017	95	—	MPC · JPL
9	2004 HR56	APO	23.35	76 m	single	3 days	28 Apr 2004	10	—	MPC · JPL
6	2004 HS56	AMO	22.4	120 m	single	9 days	06 May 2004	68	—	MPC · JPL
0	2004 HS57	MBA-I	19.0	470 m	multiple	2004–2020	16 May 2020	52	Alt.: 2014 ON253	MPC · JPL
7	2004 HT59	ATE	27.2	13 m	single	1 day	25 Apr 2004	10	—	MPC · JPL
1	2004 HK64	MBA-M	18.28	930 m	multiple	2004–2021	14 May 2021	33	Disc.: Spacewatch; Added on 11 May 2021	MPC · JPL
2	2004 HX78	TNO	7.8	130 km	multiple	2004–2019	06 May 2019	28	LoUTNOs, plutino	MPC · JPL
2	2004 HY78	TNO	8.3	103 km	multiple	2004–2016	13 Mar 2016	16	LoUTNOs, plutino	MPC · JPL
5	2004 HZ78	TNO	7.3	164 km	multiple	2004–2016	13 Mar 2016	21	LoUTNOs, plutino	MPC · JPL
3	2004 HA79	TNO	7.2	172 km	multiple	2004–2019	06 Jun 2019	19	LoUTNOs, plutino	MPC · JPL
4	2004 HB79	TNO	8.7	86 km	multiple	2004–2014	28 Jun 2014	15	LoUTNOs, plutino	MPC · JPL
4	2004 HC79	TNO	7.1	126 km	multiple	2004–2016	29 May 2016	21	LoUTNOs, cubewano (cold)	MPC · JPL
4	2004 HD79	TNO	5.7	183 km	multiple	2004–2013	10 Jun 2013	24	LoUTNOs, cubewano (cold), binary: 156 km	MPC · JPL
3	2004 HE79	TNO	7.3	115 km	multiple	2004–2015	15 Apr 2015	19	LoUTNOs, cubewano (cold)	MPC · JPL
3	2004 HG79	TNO	6.9	139 km	multiple	2004–2015	15 Apr 2015	20	LoUTNOs, cubewano (cold)	MPC · JPL
3	2004 HH79	TNO	7.0	204 km	multiple	2004–2019	07 May 2019	22	LoUTNOs, cubewano (hot)	MPC · JPL
3	2004 HK79	TNO	6.9	98 km	multiple	2004–2015	26 Apr 2015	22	LoUTNOs, cubewano (cold), binary: 98 km	MPC · JPL
5	2004 HL79	TNO	7.5	132 km	multiple	2004–2016	29 May 2016	17	LoUTNOs, other TNO	MPC · JPL
4	2004 HM79	TNO	7.5	114 km	multiple	2004–2015	22 May 2015	25	LoUTNOs, res · 3:4, BR-mag: 1.29; taxonomy: BR	MPC · JPL
2	2004 HO79	TNO	7.3	125 km	multiple	2004–2008	07 May 2008	22	LoUTNOs, res · 2:5, BR-mag: 1.52; taxonomy: IR-RR	MPC · JPL
2	2004 HQ79	TNO	7.8	104 km	multiple	2004–2015	24 May 2015	21	LoUTNOs, SDO	MPC · JPL
0	2004 HS81	MBA-I	18.6	570 m	multiple	2004–2018	18 Aug 2018	45	—	MPC · JPL
0	2004 HZ81	MBA-I	19.2	430 m	multiple	2004–2017	24 Aug 2017	44	—	MPC · JPL
1	2004 HK82	MBA-I	18.8	520 m	multiple	2004–2018	18 Oct 2018	39	—	MPC · JPL
0	2004 HN82	MBA-I	18.97	480 m	multiple	2004–2021	01 Nov 2021	37	—	MPC · JPL
0	2004 HO82	MBA-I	18.7	540 m	multiple	2004–2018	22 Jan 2018	32	—	MPC · JPL
0	2004 HY83	MBA-I	19.1	450 m	multiple	2004–2020	23 Oct 2020	48	—	MPC · JPL
0	2004 HF84	MBA-M	18.2	960 m	multiple	2004–2018	08 Aug 2018	28	—	MPC · JPL
0	2004 HL84	MBA-I	18.6	570 m	multiple	2004–2020	20 Oct 2020	40	—	MPC · JPL
0	2004 HN84	MBA-I	18.5	590 m	multiple	2004–2019	25 Apr 2019	32	—	MPC · JPL
0	2004 HP84	MBA-I	18.8	520 m	multiple	2004–2019	25 Jun 2019	29	—	MPC · JPL
0	2004 HQ84	MBA-I	18.4	620 m	multiple	2004–2019	29 Sep 2019	35	—	MPC · JPL
1	2004 HR84	MBA-O	17.16	2.1 km	multiple	2004–2021	18 Apr 2021	47	Alt.: 2010 ED154	MPC · JPL
0	2004 HJ85	MBA-I	19.04	460 m	multiple	2004–2021	13 May 2021	32	— Added on 22 July 2020	MPC · JPL
0	2004 HK85	MBA-I	18.9	490 m	multiple	2004–2019	27 Oct 2019	26	— Added on 22 July 2020	MPC · JPL
0	2004 HO85	HUN	19.2	430 m	multiple	2004–2020	09 Oct 2020	38	Disc.: LPL/Spacewatch II; Added on 19 October 2020	MPC · JPL
1	2004 HS85	MBA-I	18.8	520 m	multiple	2004–2018	17 Jun 2018	21	Disc.: LPL/Spacewatch II; Added on 17 January 2021	MPC · JPL
0	2004 HT85	MBA-I	18.8	520 m	multiple	2004–2021	17 Jan 2021	25	Disc.: SDSS; Added on 9 March 2021	MPC · JPL
0	2004 HV85	MBA-O	17.1	2.1 km	multiple	2004–2020	23 May 2020	30	Disc.: Spacewatch; Added on 11 May 2021	MPC · JPL
0	2004 HZ85	MBA-I	18.8	520 m	multiple	2004–2021	12 Feb 2021	25	Disc.: Pan-STARRS 1 Added on 17 June 2021	MPC · JPL
1	2004 HE86	MBA-O	17.0	2.2 km	multiple	2004–2021	16 Apr 2021	38	Disc.: SDSS; Added on 5 November 2021; Alt.: 2010 CL46	MPC · JPL

back to top
