= List of unnumbered minor planets: 2004 U–V =

This is a partial list of unnumbered minor planets for principal provisional designations assigned between 16 October and 15 November 2004. As of March 2026, a total of 185 bodies remain unnumbered for this period. Objects for this year are listed on the following pages: A–B · C · D–E · F · G–H · J–O · P–Q · R_{i} · R_{ii} · R_{iii} · S · T_{i} · T_{ii} · T_{iii} · T_{iv} · U–V · W–X and Y. Also see previous and next year.

Near-Earth obj.	MBA (inner)	MBA (outer)	Centaur
Mars-crosser	MBA (middle)	Jupiter trojan	Trans-Neptunian obj.
Unclassified

== U ==
U	Designation	Class	Physical		Observations				Description and notes	Ref
U	Designation	Class	H	D	Opp.	Arc	Last	Used	Description and notes	Ref
0	2004 UB	APO	20.5	280 m	multiple	2004–2020	23 Nov 2020	145	Disc.: LINEAR	MPC · JPL
0	2004 UE	APO	21.40	190 m	multiple	2004–2021	13 Nov 2021	469	Disc.: LINEAR; Potentially hazardous object	MPC · JPL
–	2004 UQ	HUN	21.8	130 m	single	2 days	18 Oct 2004	7	Disc.: Las Campanas Obs.	MPC · JPL
5	2004 UR	APO	23.1	85 m	single	49 days	09 Nov 2004	67	Disc.: LINEAR	MPC · JPL
1	2004 UZ	MBA-O	17.4	1.8 km	multiple	2004–2016	30 Dec 2016	194	Disc.: LINEAR; Alt.: 2010 OX91	MPC · JPL
7	2004 UH1	ATE	28.1	9 m	single	1 day	24 Oct 2004	18	Disc.: Spacewatch	MPC · JPL
0	2004 US1	APO	20.5	280 m	multiple	2004–2021	05 Jan 2021	268	Disc.: LINEAR	MPC · JPL
1	2004 UT1	ATE	26.77	15 m	multiple	2004-2022	19 Oct 2022	46	Disc.: LINEAR	MPC · JPL
0	2004 UV1	APO	17.7	1.0 km	multiple	2004–2018	07 Sep 2018	193	Disc.: SSS; Potentially hazardous object NEO larger than 1 kilometer	MPC · JPL
1	2004 UL9	MBA-I	19.49	310 m	multiple	2004-2025	16 Sep 2025	42	Disc.: TÜBİTAK Obs.	MPC · JPL
4	2004 UD10	TNO	6.7	152 km	multiple	2004–2018	14 Nov 2018	23	Disc.: Kitt Peak Obs. LoUTNOs, cubewano (cold)	MPC · JPL
E	2004 UE10	TNO	7.7	136 km	single	23 days	10 Nov 2004	4	Disc.: Kitt Peak Obs. LoUTNOs, plutino?	MPC · JPL
E	2004 UF10	TNO	7.8	130 km	single	23 days	10 Nov 2004	5	Disc.: Kitt Peak Obs. LoUTNOs, plutino?	MPC · JPL
3	2004 US10	TNO	9.3	65 km	multiple	2004–2015	08 Nov 2015	13	Disc.: Las Campanas Obs. LoUTNOs, plutino	MPC · JPL
E	2004 UT10	TNO	7.0	144 km	single	58 days	14 Dec 2004	6	Disc.: Las Campanas Obs. LoUTNOs, twotino?	MPC · JPL
E	2004 UU10	TNO	8.8	60 km	single	58 days	14 Dec 2004	6	Disc.: Las Campanas Obs. LoUTNOs, cubewano?	MPC · JPL
E	2004 UW10	TNO	10.5	38 km	single	58 days	14 Dec 2004	6	Disc.: Las Campanas Obs. LoUTNOs, plutino?	MPC · JPL
0	2004 UA12	MBA-I	18.5	590 m	multiple	2004–2019	02 Nov 2019	27	Disc.: Spacewatch	MPC · JPL
0	2004 UG12	MBA-I	19.2	430 m	multiple	2004–2020	15 Oct 2020	30	Disc.: Kitt Peak Obs. Added on 17 January 2021	MPC · JPL
0	2004 UH12	MBA-I	19.13	440 m	multiple	2004–2021	02 Dec 2021	57	Disc.: Spacewatch; Added on 5 November 2021	MPC · JPL
0	2004 UJ12	MBA-M	18.4	1.2 km	multiple	2004–2019	03 Apr 2019	29	Disc.: Spacewatch; Added on 29 January 2022	MPC · JPL

back to top

== V ==
U	Designation	Class	Physical		Observations				Description and notes	Ref
U	Designation	Class	H	D	Opp.	Arc	Last	Used	Description and notes	Ref
0	2004 VP	APO	22.14	130 m	multiple	2004–2021	01 Nov 2021	111	Disc.: Spacewatch	MPC · JPL
8	2004 VW	APO	23.1	85 m	single	3 days	06 Nov 2004	31	Disc.: CSS	MPC · JPL
7	2004 VZ	ATE	24.6	43 m	single	4 days	06 Nov 2004	46	Disc.: LINEAR	MPC · JPL
8	2004 VH1	APO	21.8	160 m	single	17 days	21 Nov 2004	36	Disc.: CSS	MPC · JPL
4	2004 VJ1	ATE	24.1	54 m	multiple	2004–2015	09 Dec 2015	98	Disc.: CSS	MPC · JPL
1	2004 VM4	MBA-M	18.46	850 m	multiple	2004–2021	30 Nov 2021	94	Disc.: Spacewatch; Added on 21 August 2021	MPC · JPL
1	2004 VY14	APO	19.7	410 m	multiple	2004–2015	14 Nov 2015	75	Disc.: CSS; Alt.: 2015 DA199	MPC · JPL
0	2004 VZ14	APO	25.04	40 m	multiple	2004-2023	04 Nov 2023	97	Disc.: CSS	MPC · JPL
–	2004 VA17	MCA	21.9	120 m	single	4 days	08 Nov 2004	13	Disc.: Spacewatch	MPC · JPL
0	2004 VR17	MBA-M	18.66	780 m	multiple	2004–2021	08 Dec 2021	31	Disc.: NEAT; Added on 21 August 2021	MPC · JPL
0	2004 VC18	MBA-M	17.9	1.5 km	multiple	2003–2018	15 Nov 2018	55	Disc.: Spacewatch; Alt.: 2018 TB31	MPC · JPL
5	2004 VM24	APO	25.7	26 m	single	3 days	12 Nov 2004	129	Disc.: CSS	MPC · JPL
0	2004 VC32	MBA-O	17.16	2.1 km	multiple	2004–2021	09 Dec 2021	60	Disc.: Spacewatch	MPC · JPL
0	2004 VD32	MBA-O	17.28	1.9 km	multiple	2004–2021	24 Nov 2021	60	Disc.: Spacewatch; Added on 24 December 2021	MPC · JPL
0	2004 VW33	MBA-I	18.3	650 m	multiple	2004–2019	20 Dec 2019	35	Disc.: Spacewatch	MPC · JPL
1	2004 VV34	MBA-M	17.9	1.5 km	multiple	2004–2018	17 Nov 2018	24	Disc.: Spacewatch; Added on 19 October 2020	MPC · JPL
1	2004 VZ34	MBA-M	18.8	520 m	multiple	2004–2020	14 Sep 2020	48	Disc.: Spacewatch; Added on 19 October 2020	MPC · JPL
1	2004 VN38	MBA-I	19.8	330 m	multiple	2004–2020	23 Nov 2020	24	Disc.: Spacewatch	MPC · JPL
–	2004 VS38	MBA-M	19.4	550 m	single	7 days	11 Nov 2004	9	Disc.: Spacewatch	MPC · JPL
0	2004 VY38	MBA-I	18.3	650 m	multiple	2004–2019	19 Nov 2019	56	Disc.: Spacewatch	MPC · JPL
0	2004 VL39	MBA-I	18.9	490 m	multiple	2004–2019	03 Dec 2019	32	Disc.: Spacewatch	MPC · JPL
–	2004 VM39	MBA-O	18.4	1.2 km	single	16 days	20 Nov 2004	11	Disc.: Spacewatch	MPC · JPL
0	2004 VT39	MBA-O	17.55	1.9 km	multiple	2004-2023	16 May 2023	38	Disc.: Spacewatch	MPC · JPL
2	2004 VZ40	MBA-O	17.7	1.6 km	multiple	2004–2020	15 Oct 2020	42	Disc.: Spacewatch; Added on 9 March 2021; Alt.: 2020 QV34	MPC · JPL
1	2004 VZ42	MBA-O	17.52	1.7 km	multiple	2004–2021	30 Nov 2021	40	Disc.: Spacewatch; Added on 24 December 2021	MPC · JPL
3	2004 VK44	MBA-M	17.7	1.6 km	multiple	2004–2018	13 Dec 2018	38	Disc.: Spacewatch; Alt.: 2018 VQ80	MPC · JPL
0	2004 VN47	MBA-I	19.30	410 m	multiple	2004–2021	24 Nov 2021	68	Disc.: Spacewatch; Added on 5 November 2021; Alt.: 2014 RC2	MPC · JPL
0	2004 VL49	MBA-M	17.9	1.5 km	multiple	2004–2017	13 Sep 2017	26	Disc.: Spacewatch; Added on 22 July 2020	MPC · JPL
1	2004 VP49	MBA-M	18.0	1.4 km	multiple	2004–2019	08 Jan 2019	21	Disc.: Spacewatch; Added on 24 December 2021	MPC · JPL
0	2004 VX50	MBA-I	18.8	520 m	multiple	2004–2019	08 Nov 2019	18	Disc.: <Spacewatch; Added on 17 January 2021	MPC · JPL
0	2004 VZ55	MBA-M	18.20	960 m	multiple	2004–2021	09 Aug 2021	23	Disc.: Spacewatch	MPC · JPL
6	2004 VZ60	AMO	24.8	39 m	single	40 days	14 Dec 2004	32	Disc.: CSS	MPC · JPL
1	2004 VB61	AMO	22.1	140 m	multiple	2004–2019	03 Jan 2019	51	Disc.: LINEAR	MPC · JPL
0	2004 VQ63	MCA	18.13	700 m	multiple	2004–2021	02 Jun 2021	108	Disc.: LINEAR	MPC · JPL
5	2004 VQ65	APO	22.3	120 m	single	18 days	02 Dec 2004	36	Disc.: CSS	MPC · JPL
0	2004 VK66	MBA-M	18.28	930 m	multiple	2004–2021	31 Aug 2021	30	Disc.: Spacewatch	MPC · JPL
0	2004 VQ67	MBA-M	17.9	1.5 km	multiple	2004–2020	26 Apr 2020	38	Disc.: Kitt Peak Obs. Added on 22 July 2020	MPC · JPL
0	2004 VT67	MBA-O	17.83	1.5 km	multiple	2004–2021	07 Nov 2021	55	Disc.: Kitt Peak Obs. Alt.: 2015 TU295	MPC · JPL
0	2004 VX67	MBA-M	18.10	1.3 km	multiple	2004–2021	08 May 2021	45	Disc.: Kitt Peak Obs. Added on 22 July 2020	MPC · JPL
1	2004 VR68	MBA-O	17.70	1.6 km	multiple	2004–2021	02 Dec 2021	57	Disc.: Spacewatch	MPC · JPL
1	2004 VP69	MBA-I	18.2	680 m	multiple	2004–2017	28 Jan 2017	30	Disc.: Kitt Peak Obs.	MPC · JPL
0	2004 VG70	MBA-M	18.31	1.2 km	multiple	2004–2018	12 Dec 2018	65	Disc.: LONEOS; Alt.: 2018 UJ19	MPC · JPL
0	2004 VR71	HUN	19.19	430 m	multiple	2004–2021	01 Dec 2021	33	Disc.: Spacewatch	MPC · JPL
4	2004 VU75	TNO	6.7	157 km	multiple	2004–2013	06 Oct 2013	20	Disc.: Kitt Peak Obs. LoUTNOs, cubewano?, contact	MPC · JPL
9	2004 VV75	TNO	8.7	86 km	single	9 days	18 Nov 2004	5	Disc.: Kitt Peak Obs. LoUTNOs, plutino?	MPC · JPL
9	2004 VW75	TNO	8.7	86 km	single	1 day	10 Nov 2004	3	Disc.: Kitt Peak Obs. LoUTNOs, plutino?	MPC · JPL
9	2004 VX75	TNO	7.1	158 km	single	1 day	10 Nov 2004	3	Disc.: Kitt Peak Obs. LoUTNOs, other TNO	MPC · JPL
9	2004 VY75	TNO	6.9	143 km	single	1 day	10 Nov 2004	3	Disc.: Kitt Peak Obs. LoUTNOs, cubewano?	MPC · JPL
4	2004 VZ75	TNO	6.4	248 km	multiple	2003–2019	08 Feb 2019	25	Disc.: Kitt Peak Obs. LoUTNOs, plutino	MPC · JPL
9	2004 VA76	TNO	6.8	150 km	single	2 days	11 Nov 2004	3	Disc.: Kitt Peak Obs. LoUTNOs, cubewano?	MPC · JPL
4	2004 VK78	TNO	7.92	94 km	multiple	2004–2020	09 Dec 2020	27	Disc.: Kitt Peak Obs. LoUTNOs, twotino	MPC · JPL
9	2004 VL78	TNO	8.2	108 km	single	7 days	18 Nov 2004	4	Disc.: Kitt Peak Obs. LoUTNOs, plutino?	MPC · JPL
9	2004 VM78	TNO	6.9	173 km	single	7 days	18 Nov 2004	4	Disc.: Kitt Peak Obs. LoUTNOs, other TNO	MPC · JPL
E	2004 VN78	TNO	8.0	119 km	single	30 days	11 Dec 2004	6	Disc.: Kitt Peak Obs. LoUTNOs, plutino?	MPC · JPL
1	2004 VN79	MBA-I	18.5	590 m	multiple	2000–2012	21 Dec 2012	29	Disc.: Spacewatch	MPC · JPL
1	2004 VV79	MBA-O	17.7	1.6 km	multiple	2004–2020	27 Jan 2020	20	Disc.: Spacewatch; Added on 17 June 2021	MPC · JPL
2	2004 VZ79	MBA-O	17.18	2.0 km	multiple	2004–2021	06 Nov 2021	53	Disc.: Spacewatch	MPC · JPL
1	2004 VF81	MBA-M	17.8	1.5 km	multiple	2004–2017	16 Aug 2017	33	Disc.: Spacewatch	MPC · JPL
0	2004 VD82	MBA-I	19.37	400 m	multiple	2004–2021	24 Nov 2021	60	Disc.: Spacewatch; Added on 5 November 2021; Alt.: 2014 OD268	MPC · JPL
0	2004 VF83	MBA-M	18.0	1.1 km	multiple	2004–2021	28 Nov 2021	42	Disc.: Spacewatch; Added on 29 January 2022	MPC · JPL
1	2004 VB88	MBA-M	18.1	710 m	multiple	2004–2020	09 Oct 2020	57	Disc.: Spacewatch; Alt.: 2012 TV156	MPC · JPL
1	2004 VN89	MBA-M	18.0	750 m	multiple	1992–2020	08 Dec 2020	48	Disc.: Spacewatch; Added on 9 March 2021; Alt.: 2012 UJ121	MPC · JPL
1	2004 VG95	MBA-O	17.5	1.8 km	multiple	2004–2021	30 Nov 2021	41	Disc.: Kitt Peak Obs. Added on 24 December 2021	MPC · JPL
0	2004 VP97	MBA-M	18.32	910 m	multiple	2004–2020	19 Apr 2020	28	Disc.: Mauna Kea Obs. Added on 21 August 2021; Alt.: 2019 AY39	MPC · JPL
0	2004 VX97	MBA-O	17.8	1.5 km	multiple	2004–2020	25 Oct 2020	36	Disc.: Mauna Kea Obs.	MPC · JPL
1	2004 VJ98	MBA-O	17.45	1.8 km	multiple	2003–2021	26 Oct 2021	35	Disc.: Mauna Kea Obs. Added on 19 October 2020	MPC · JPL
0	2004 VE99	MBA-O	17.7	1.6 km	multiple	2004–2020	21 Oct 2020	54	Disc.: Mauna Kea Obs.	MPC · JPL
1	2004 VP99	MBA-M	18.6	570 m	multiple	2004–2020	14 Nov 2020	37	Disc.: Mauna Kea Obs. Added on 17 January 2021; Alt.: 2012 UU74	MPC · JPL
0	2004 VW99	MBA-O	17.8	1.5 km	multiple	2004–2020	10 Nov 2020	33	Disc.: Mauna Kea Obs. Added on 19 October 2020; Alt.: 2009 SM87	MPC · JPL
0	2004 VA100	MBA-O	18.08	1.3 km	multiple	2003–2021	07 Apr 2021	39	Disc.: Mauna Kea Obs. Added on 22 July 2020	MPC · JPL
2	2004 VT100	MBA-O	17.9	1.5 km	multiple	2004–2020	22 Sep 2020	30	Disc.: Mauna Kea Obs. Added on 17 January 2021	MPC · JPL
–	2004 VY100	MBA-O	17.7	1.6 km	single	7 days	10 Nov 2004	7	Disc.: Mauna Kea Obs.	MPC · JPL
2	2004 VB101	MBA-O	18.2	1.3 km	multiple	2004–2020	23 Sep 2020	35	Disc.: Mauna Kea Obs. Added on 17 January 2021	MPC · JPL
–	2004 VW101	MBA-O	18.0	1.4 km	single	2 days	11 Nov 2004	6	Disc.: Mauna Kea Obs.	MPC · JPL
E	2004 VY101	MBA-O	18.2	1.3 km	single	2 days	11 Nov 2004	6	Disc.: Mauna Kea Obs.	MPC · JPL
2	2004 VA102	MBA-O	17.9	1.5 km	multiple	2004–2014	24 Jun 2014	13	Disc.: Mauna Kea Obs. Added on 30 September 2021	MPC · JPL
0	2004 VK102	MBA-M	18.49	840 m	multiple	2004–2021	11 Nov 2021	27	Disc.: Mauna Kea Obs. Added on 17 June 2021; Alt.: 2017 YE9	MPC · JPL
–	2004 VY102	MBA-O	19.6	670 m	single	2 days	11 Nov 2004	6	Disc.: Mauna Kea Obs.	MPC · JPL
4	2004 VL104	MBA-O	18.1	1.3 km	multiple	2004–2020	05 Nov 2020	18	Disc.: Mauna Kea Obs. Added on 11 May 2021	MPC · JPL
0	2004 VJ105	MBA-M	18.2	1.3 km	multiple	2004–2015	25 Mar 2015	30	Disc.: Mauna Kea Obs. Added on 21 August 2021; Alt.: 2010 AB43	MPC · JPL
1	2004 VE106	MBA-M	18.1	710 m	multiple	2004–2020	17 Nov 2020	30	Disc.: Mauna Kea Obs. Added on 22 July 2020; Alt.: 2006 CA70	MPC · JPL
0	2004 VG106	MBA-M	18.53	580 m	multiple	2002–2022	25 Jan 2022	18	Disc.: Mauna Kea Obs. Added on 5 November 2021	MPC · JPL
1	2004 VK106	MBA-O	17.71	1.8 km	multiple	2004–2025	08 Jul 2025	35	Disc.: Mauna Kea Obs. Added on 21 August 2021; Alt.: 2015 VH76	MPC · JPL
2	2004 VW106	MBA-M	18.5	840 m	multiple	2004–2021	08 Sep 2021	26	Disc.: Mauna Kea Obs. Added on 29 January 2022	MPC · JPL
0	2004 VX106	MBA-M	18.1	1.3 km	multiple	2004–2020	22 Apr 2020	37	Disc.: Mauna Kea Obs. Added on 21 August 2021; Alt.: 2011 FV18, 2011 GR50	MPC · JPL
1	2004 VY106	MBA-M	18.4	880 m	multiple	2004–2021	13 Sep 2021	22	Disc.: Mauna Kea Obs. Added on 29 January 2022	MPC · JPL
2	2004 VN107	MBA-I	19.2	430 m	multiple	2004–2020	29 Apr 2020	41	Disc.: Mauna Kea Obs.	MPC · JPL
–	2004 VS107	MBA-I	19.3	410 m	single	23 days	10 Nov 2004	6	Disc.: Mauna Kea Obs.	MPC · JPL
1	2004 VE108	MBA-O	17.4	1.8 km	multiple	2004–2020	14 Oct 2020	55	Disc.: Mauna Kea Obs. Alt.: 2015 TN71	MPC · JPL
2	2004 VO108	MBA-O	18.14	1.3 km	multiple	2004–2019	26 Sep 2019	20	Disc.: Mauna Kea Obs. Added on 11 May 2021; Alt.: 2019 RZ54	MPC · JPL
3	2004 VQ108	MBA-M	18.7	760 m	multiple	2004–2021	07 Sep 2021	17	Disc.: Mauna Kea Obs. Added on 30 September 2021	MPC · JPL
1	2004 VU108	MBA-O	17.3	1.9 km	multiple	2004–2020	21 Oct 2020	31	Disc.: Mauna Kea Obs. Added on 17 January 2021	MPC · JPL
2	2004 VW108	MBA-O	18.05	1.4 km	multiple	2004–2021	11 Nov 2021	35	Disc.: Mauna Kea Obs. Added on 22 July 2020	MPC · JPL
0	2004 VX108	MBA-O	17.33	2.2 km	multiple	2004-2023	28 Mar 2023	54	Disc.: Mauna Kea Obs.	MPC · JPL
0	2004 VB109	MBA-M	17.7	1.6 km	multiple	2004–2017	22 Sep 2017	34	Disc.: Mauna Kea Obs.	MPC · JPL
0	2004 VJ109	MBA-O	17.5	1.8 km	multiple	2004–2020	10 Dec 2020	19	Disc.: Mauna Kea Obs. Added on 11 May 2021	MPC · JPL
0	2004 VG110	MBA-M	17.67	1.1 km	multiple	2004-2025	22 Dec 2025	35	Disc.: Mauna Kea Obs.	MPC · JPL
1	2004 VH110	MBA-O	17.2	2.0 km	multiple	2004–2020	15 Oct 2020	26	Disc.: Mauna Kea Obs. Added on 22 July 2020	MPC · JPL
E	2004 VP112	CEN	15.0	6.0 km	single	1 day	10 Nov 2004	4	Disc.: Mauna Kea Obs.	MPC · JPL
3	2004 VK113	MBA-M	18.9	700 m	multiple	2004–2017	22 Nov 2017	13	Disc.: Mauna Kea Obs.	MPC · JPL
0	2004 VJ114	MBA-I	19.31	410 m	multiple	2004–2021	16 May 2021	31	Disc.: Mauna Kea Obs. Added on 21 August 2021; Alt.: 2021 HC9	MPC · JPL
4	2004 VK114	MBA-O	18.3	1.2 km	multiple	2004–2020	15 Oct 2020	18	Disc.: Mauna Kea Obs. Added on 17 June 2021; Alt.: 2020 RS99	MPC · JPL
1	2004 VT114	MBA-M	18.8	520 m	multiple	2004–2019	25 Jul 2019	20	Disc.: Mauna Kea Obs.	MPC · JPL
1	2004 VL116	MBA-I	19.0	470 m	multiple	2004–2019	26 Sep 2019	21	Disc.: Mauna Kea Obs. Added on 17 January 2021; Alt.: 2015 OY132	MPC · JPL
0	2004 VM117	MBA-I	19.3	410 m	multiple	2004–2019	28 Oct 2019	35	Disc.: Mauna Kea Obs.	MPC · JPL
0	2004 VT118	MBA-O	17.01	2.2 km	multiple	2004–2022	07 Jan 2022	55	Disc.: Mauna Kea Obs. Alt.: 2020 PD21	MPC · JPL
–	2004 VG119	MBA-O	20.3	480 m	single	2 days	11 Nov 2004	6	Disc.: Mauna Kea Obs.	MPC · JPL
E	2004 VH119	MBA-O	18.2	1.3 km	single	2 days	11 Nov 2004	6	Disc.: Mauna Kea Obs.	MPC · JPL
–	2004 VJ119	MBA-I	19.5	370 m	single	2 days	11 Nov 2004	6	Disc.: Mauna Kea Obs.	MPC · JPL
E	2004 VM119	MCA	21.1	180 m	single	2 days	11 Nov 2004	6	Disc.: Mauna Kea Obs.	MPC · JPL
–	2004 VW119	MBA-O	19.1	840 m	single	2 days	11 Nov 2004	6	Disc.: Mauna Kea Obs.	MPC · JPL
E	2004 VB120	MBA-O	17.9	1.5 km	single	2 days	11 Nov 2004	6	Disc.: Mauna Kea Obs.	MPC · JPL
2	2004 VC120	MBA-I	18.4	620 m	multiple	2004–2018	19 May 2018	25	Disc.: Mauna Kea Obs. Alt.: 2014 GV12	MPC · JPL
3	2004 VG120	MBA-I	18.96	280 m	multiple	2004-2023	26 Mar 2023	19	Disc.: Mauna Kea Obs.	MPC · JPL
3	2004 VO120	MBA-I	18.9	490 m	multiple	2004–2019	10 Jan 2019	28	Disc.: Mauna Kea Obs. Alt.: 2011 WX26	MPC · JPL
3	2004 VB121	MBA-M	19.7	480 m	multiple	2004–2021	08 Dec 2021	27	Disc.: Mauna Kea Obs.	MPC · JPL
0	2004 VK121	MBA-O	18.0	1.4 km	multiple	2004–2021	14 May 2021	40	Disc.: Mauna Kea Obs. Added on 30 September 2021; Alt.: 2016 ED11	MPC · JPL
1	2004 VG123	MBA-I	18.6	570 m	multiple	2004–2019	04 Dec 2019	41	Disc.: Mauna Kea Obs.	MPC · JPL
–	2004 VW123	MBA-M	18.7	1.0 km	single	23 days	10 Nov 2004	6	Disc.: Mauna Kea Obs.	MPC · JPL
1	2004 VX124	MBA-I	19.4	390 m	multiple	2004–2020	15 May 2020	18	Disc.: Mauna Kea Obs. Added on 21 August 2021	MPC · JPL
1	2004 VW125	MBA-I	19.4	390 m	multiple	2004–2019	25 Sep 2019	25	Disc.: Mauna Kea Obs. Added on 22 July 2020; Alt.: 2015 PD68	MPC · JPL
0	2004 VN126	MBA-M	18.39	880 m	multiple	2004–2020	23 Aug 2020	37	Disc.: Mauna Kea Obs.	MPC · JPL
2	2004 VU126	MBA-I	20.3	260 m	multiple	2004–2017	16 Sep 2017	17	Disc.: Mauna Kea Obs.	MPC · JPL
1	2004 VV127	MBA-O	17.77	1.6 km	multiple	2004–2022	25 Jan 2022	30	Disc.: Mauna Kea Obs. Alt.: 2012 HO70	MPC · JPL
0	2004 VW127	MBA-M	18.4	620 m	multiple	2004–2020	22 Sep 2020	43	Disc.: Mauna Kea Obs. Added on 11 May 2021	MPC · JPL
–	2004 VK128	HIL	16.9	2.3 km	single	23 days	10 Nov 2004	6	Disc.: Mauna Kea Obs.	MPC · JPL
1	2004 VL128	MBA-O	17.54	2.1 km	multiple	2004-2024	04 May 2024	35	Disc.: Mauna Kea Obs.	MPC · JPL
3	2004 VC129	MCA	19.8	330 m	multiple	2004–2015	07 Nov 2015	15	Disc.: Mauna Kea Obs. Added on 29 January 2022	MPC · JPL
0	2004 VJ129	MBA-M	17.6	1.7 km	multiple	2004–2019	09 Jan 2019	72	Disc.: Spacewatch; Alt.: 2010 HE18, 2015 FU321	MPC · JPL
0	2004 VA130	MBA-M	18.37	890 m	multiple	2004–2021	03 Oct 2021	37	Disc.: Mauna Kea Obs. Added on 29 January 2022	MPC · JPL
E	2004 VT130	CEN	15.5	4.0 km	single	1 day	10 Nov 2004	4	Disc.: Mauna Kea Obs.	MPC · JPL
2	2004 VU130	TNO	6.9	151 km	multiple	1999–2008	06 Dec 2008	26	Disc.: Mauna Kea Obs. LoUTNOs, res · 1:3	MPC · JPL
4	2004 VX130	TNO	7.71	136 km	multiple	2004–2020	09 Dec 2020	22	Disc.: Mauna Kea Obs. LoUTNOs, plutino	MPC · JPL
3	2004 VY130	TNO	8.1	113 km	multiple	2004–2017	20 Dec 2017	36	Disc.: Mauna Kea Obs. LoUTNOs, plutino	MPC · JPL
4	2004 VZ130	TNO	8.79	83 km	multiple	2004–2021	11 Jan 2021	33	Disc.: Mauna Kea Obs. LoUTNOs, plutino	MPC · JPL
3	2004 VD131	TNO	6.60	159 km	multiple	1999–2020	09 Dec 2020	34	Disc.: Mauna Kea Obs. LoUTNOs, cubewano (cold)	MPC · JPL
4	2004 VE131	TNO	7.6	109 km	multiple	2004–2013	07 Oct 2013	16	Disc.: Mauna Kea Obs. LoUTNOs, res · 3:5	MPC · JPL
2	2004 VF131	TNO	6.8	158 km	multiple	1999–2009	19 Aug 2009	26	Disc.: Mauna Kea Obs. LoUTNOs, res · 4:7	MPC · JPL
4	2004 VG131	TNO	8.39	79 km	multiple	2004–2021	05 Nov 2021	17	Disc.: Mauna Kea Obs. LoUTNOs, SDO	MPC · JPL
2	2004 VH131	TNO	9.7	64 km	multiple	2004–2007	12 Sep 2007	26	Disc.: Mauna Kea Obs. LoUTNOs, centaur	MPC · JPL
1	2004 VM131	TNO	8.4	116 km	multiple	1999–2016	13 Mar 2016	34	Disc.: Mauna Kea Obs. LoUTNOs, centaur	MPC · JPL
4	2004 VU131	TNO	7.4	110 km	multiple	2004–2017	13 Dec 2017	44	Disc.: Mauna Kea Obs. LoUTNOs, cubewano (cold)	MPC · JPL
1	2004 VB134	MBA-I	18.7	540 m	multiple	2004–2018	20 Oct 2018	36	Disc.: Kitt Peak Obs.	MPC · JPL
0	2004 VT134	HUN	19.2	430 m	multiple	2004–2016	01 Jan 2016	20	Disc.: Spacewatch	MPC · JPL
0	2004 VN135	MBA-I	18.8	520 m	multiple	2004–2019	28 Oct 2019	42	Disc.: Spacewatch	MPC · JPL
0	2004 VS135	MBA-I	18.7	540 m	multiple	2004–2019	27 Oct 2019	45	Disc.: Spacewatch	MPC · JPL
2	2004 VD136	MBA-O	17.4	1.8 km	multiple	2004–2021	17 Feb 2021	41	Disc.: Kitt Peak Obs.	MPC · JPL
0	2004 VU136	MBA-I	18.6	570 m	multiple	2004–2018	12 Jul 2018	44	Disc.: Spacewatch	MPC · JPL
1	2004 VV136	MBA-I	18.9	490 m	multiple	2004–2019	27 Oct 2019	30	Disc.: Kitt Peak Obs.	MPC · JPL
1	2004 VW136	MBA-M	18.4	620 m	multiple	2004–2020	15 Oct 2020	46	Disc.: Mauna Kea Obs.	MPC · JPL
0	2004 VB137	MBA-M	18.3	1.2 km	multiple	2004–2019	08 Feb 2019	30	Disc.: Spacewatch	MPC · JPL
0	2004 VJ137	MBA-I	18.6	570 m	multiple	2004–2019	04 Dec 2019	50	Disc.: Spacewatch	MPC · JPL
0	2004 VL137	MBA-I	18.7	540 m	multiple	2004–2019	03 Dec 2019	27	Disc.: Spacewatch	MPC · JPL
1	2004 VR137	MBA-I	18.9	490 m	multiple	2004–2019	28 Oct 2019	41	Disc.: Kitt Peak Obs.	MPC · JPL
2	2004 VU137	MBA-I	18.6	570 m	multiple	2004–2019	29 Sep 2019	21	Disc.: Kitt Peak Obs.	MPC · JPL
0	2004 VX137	MBA-I	19.0	470 m	multiple	2004–2017	18 Mar 2017	26	Disc.: Pan-STARRS; Added on 22 July 2020	MPC · JPL
0	2004 VF138	MBA-O	17.2	2.0 km	multiple	2004–2020	13 Sep 2020	24	Disc.: Pan-STARRS 1 Added on 11 May 2021	MPC · JPL
2	2004 VK138	MCA	18.9	490 m	multiple	2004–2021	10 Feb 2021	27	Disc.: Spacewatch; Added on 21 August 2021	MPC · JPL
0	2004 VN138	HIL	16.87	2.4 km	multiple	2004–2021	18 Jan 2021	38	Disc.: Spacewatch; Added on 30 September 2021	MPC · JPL
0	2004 VP138	MBA-O	18.11	1.3 km	multiple	1998–2021	30 Oct 2021	40	Disc.: Pan-STARRS; Added on 5 November 2021	MPC · JPL
1	2004 VQ138	MBA-M	18.95	680 m	multiple	2004–2021	07 Nov 2021	25	Disc.: Pan-STARRS; Added on 5 November 2021	MPC · JPL
0	2004 VR138	MBA-O	17.3	1.9 km	multiple	2004–2021	05 Oct 2021	31	Disc.: Pan-STARRS; Added on 5 November 2021	MPC · JPL
0	2004 VT138	MBA-O	17.27	2.0 km	multiple	2004–2021	30 Nov 2021	72	Disc.: Spacewatch; Added on 24 December 2021	MPC · JPL
0	2004 VV138	MBA-O	17.15	2.1 km	multiple	2004–2021	09 Dec 2021	61	Disc.: Spacewatch; Added on 24 December 2021	MPC · JPL
1	2004 VW138	MBA-M	18.50	840 m	multiple	2004–2021	09 Nov 2021	30	Disc.: Kitt Peak Obs. Added on 24 December 2021	MPC · JPL
0	2004 VX138	MBA-M	17.83	810 m	multiple	2004–2022	25 Jan 2022	34	Disc.: Pan-STARRS; Added on 24 December 2021	MPC · JPL

back to top
