= List of unnumbered minor planets: 2004 A–B =

This is a partial list of unnumbered minor planets for principal provisional designations assigned during 1–31 January 2004. As of May 2026, a total of 102 bodies remain unnumbered for this period. Objects for this year are listed on the following pages: A–B · C · D–E · F · G–H · J–O · P–Q · R_{i} · R_{ii} · R_{iii} · S · T_{i} · T_{ii} · T_{iii} · T_{iv} · U–V · W–X and Y. Also see previous and next year.

| Near-Earth obj. | MBA (inner) | MBA (outer) | Centaur |
| Mars-crosser | MBA (middle) | Jupiter trojan | Trans-Neptunian obj. |
| Unclassified |

== A ==
| U | Designation | Class | Physical | | Observations | | | | Description and notes | Ref |
| U | Designation | Class | H | D | Opp. | Arc | Last | Used | Description and notes | Ref |
|---|---|---|---|---|---|---|---|---|---|---|
| 2 | 2004 AC | APO | 18.9 | 590 m | multiple | 2004–2020 | 20 Dec 2020 | 147 | Disc.: LINEAR | MPC; JPL |
| 5 | 2004 AD | APO | 24.4 | 47 m | single | 26 days | 30 Jan 2004 | 86 | Disc.: LONEOS | MPC; JPL |
| 7 | 2004 AM | AMO | 19.3 | 490 m | single | 16 days | 28 Jan 2004 | 24 | Disc.: NEAT | MPC; JPL |
| 1 | 2004 AD1 | APO | 22.5 | 110 m | multiple | 2004–2019 | 30 Aug 2019 | 74 | Disc.: LONEOS | MPC; JPL |
| 2 | 2004 AY1 | APO | 21.2 | 200 m | multiple | 2004–2017 | 24 Feb 2017 | 61 | Disc.: LINEAR | MPC; JPL |
| 7 | 2004 AE6 | APO | 24.4 | 47 m | single | 17 days | 01 Feb 2004 | 26 | Disc.: Spacewatch | MPC; JPL |
| 2 | 2004 AL6 | MBA-M | 18.2 | 680 m | multiple | 2004–2019 | 24 Oct 2019 | 31 | Disc.: Spacewatch | MPC; JPL |
| 0 | 2004 AE9 | Asteroid | 17.77 | 1.8 km | multiple | 2004-2026 | 12 Nov 2026 | 95 | Disc.: LONEOS; MBA at MPC | MPC; JPL |
| 0 | 2004 AC16 | MBA-O | 16.3 | 3.1 km | multiple | 2004–2021 | 17 Jan 2021 | 38 | Disc.: Spacewatch; Added on 11 May 2021; Alt.: 2010 JW12 | MPC; JPL |
| 0 | 2004 AP18 | MBA-O | 16.8 | 2.4 km | multiple | 2004–2021 | 18 Jan 2021 | 45 | Disc.: Spacewatch | MPC; JPL |
| 2 | 2004 AF19 | MBA-I | 18.6 | 570 m | multiple | 2004–2019 | 10 Jan 2019 | 28 | Disc.: Spacewatch; Added on 22 July 2020 | MPC; JPL |
| 0 | 2004 AH19 | MBA-I | 18.95 | 480 m | multiple | 2003–2021 | 09 Nov 2021 | 43 | Disc.: Spacewatch | MPC; JPL |
| 0 | 2004 AM24 | MBA-I | 18.6 | 570 m | multiple | 2004–2020 | 17 Dec 2020 | 36 | Disc.: Spacewatch | MPC; JPL |
| 0 | 2004 AG27 | MBA-I | 18.96 | 480 m | multiple | 2004–2021 | 07 Nov 2021 | 54 | Disc.: Spacewatch | MPC; JPL |
| 0 | 2004 AM27 | MBA-I | 18.7 | 540 m | multiple | 2004–2019 | 01 Nov 2019 | 37 | Disc.: Spacewatch | MPC; JPL |
| 0 | 2004 AQ27 | MBA-I | 18.7 | 540 m | multiple | 2004–2020 | 23 Jun 2020 | 50 | Disc.: Spacewatch | MPC; JPL |

back to top

== B ==
| U | Designation | Class | Physical | | Observations | | | | Description and notes | Ref |
| U | Designation | Class | H | D | Opp. | Arc | Last | Used | Description and notes | Ref |
|---|---|---|---|---|---|---|---|---|---|---|
| 0 | 2004 BB1 | MBA-O | 17.9 | 1.5 km | multiple | 2004–2020 | 02 Feb 2020 | 41 | Disc.: Spacewatch; Added on 22 July 2020 | MPC; JPL |
| 8 | 2004 BY1 | ATE | 24.5 | 45 m | single | 28 days | 14 Feb 2004 | 37 | Disc.: AMOS | MPC; JPL |
| – | 2004 BK7 | MBA-M | 19.6 | 360 m | single | 2 days | 18 Jan 2004 | 9 | Disc.: Spacewatch | MPC; JPL |
| – | 2004 BD11 | MCA | 21.2 | 170 m | single | 2 days | 19 Jan 2004 | 18 | Disc.: Spacewatch | MPC; JPL |
| 6 | 2004 BF11 | AMO | 24.0 | 56 m | single | 35 days | 22 Feb 2004 | 37 | Disc.: Spacewatch | MPC; JPL |
| 2 | 2004 BH11 | APO | 23.95 | 60 m | multiple | 2004-2024 | 15 Feb 2024 | 28 | Disc.: Spacewatch | MPC; JPL |
| 5 | 2004 BJ11 | AMO | 21.7 | 160 m | multiple | 2004–2011 | 02 Feb 2011 | 21 | Disc.: Spacewatch | MPC; JPL |
| 5 | 2004 BK11 | AMO | 22.4 | 120 m | single | 29 days | 16 Feb 2004 | 31 | Disc.: Spacewatch | MPC; JPL |
| 1 | 2004 BM11 | APO | 21.99 | 150 m | multiple | 2004–2016 | 30 Aug 2016 | 45 | Disc.: NEAT; Alt.: 2016 QP11 | MPC; JPL |
| 0 | 2004 BR18 | MBA-I | 18.94 | 480 m | multiple | 2004–2021 | 27 Nov 2021 | 63 | Disc.: Spacewatch; Added on 5 November 2021 | MPC; JPL |
| 5 | 2004 BV18 | APO | 25.9 | 23 m | single | 30 days | 18 Feb 2004 | 96 | Disc.: Spacewatch | MPC; JPL |
| 4 | 2004 BW18 | AMO | 22.5 | 110 m | single | 105 days | 13 Apr 2004 | 93 | Disc.: LINEAR | MPC; JPL |
| 6 | 2004 BZ18 | AMO | 21.2 | 200 m | single | 27 days | 15 Feb 2004 | 30 | Disc.: LINEAR | MPC; JPL |
| 0 | 2004 BY21 | AMO | 18.8 | 620 m | multiple | 2004–2019 | 15 Jan 2019 | 50 | Disc.: LINEAR | MPC; JPL |
| 0 | 2004 BD22 | MCA | 17.8 | 820 m | multiple | 2004–2019 | 24 Aug 2019 | 70 | Disc.: NEAT; Alt.: 2015 OF47 | MPC; JPL |
| 0 | 2004 BG41 | APO | 24.4 | 47 m | multiple | 2004–2015 | 02 Nov 2015 | 84 | Disc.: LINEAR; Alt.: 2008 AA31 | MPC; JPL |
| E | 2004 BL41 | MBA-M | 19.1 | 640 m | single | 3 days | 26 Jan 2004 | 16 | Disc.: Sierra Nevada Obs. | MPC; JPL |
| 8 | 2004 BN41 | APO | 26.1 | 21 m | single | 7 days | 30 Jan 2004 | 23 | Disc.: LINEAR | MPC; JPL |
| 0 | 2004 BP53 | MCA | 18.9 | 700 m | multiple | 2004–2021 | 10 Feb 2021 | 47 | Disc.: LINEAR; Added on 9 March 2021 | MPC; JPL |
| 0 | 2004 BR58 | MBA-M | 18.0 | 1.1 km | multiple | 2004–2021 | 11 Jan 2021 | 81 | Disc.: Sandlot Obs. Alt.: 2017 BV132 | MPC; JPL |
| 0 | 2004 BT58 | ATE | 22.2 | 130 m | multiple | 2004–2020 | 25 Jan 2020 | 132 | Disc.: LINEAR | MPC; JPL |
| 0 | 2004 BX58 | AMO | 19.57 | 450 m | multiple | 2004-2022 | 04 Dec 2022 | 61 | Disc.: LINEAR | MPC; JPL |
| 1 | 2004 BZ62 | MBA-M | 16.8 | 1.3 km | multiple | 2004–2020 | 18 Jan 2020 | 35 | Disc.: LINEAR; Alt.: 2008 CX89 | MPC; JPL |
| 0 | 2004 BH65 | MBA-O | 17.7 | 1.6 km | multiple | 2003–2020 | 03 Feb 2020 | 30 | Disc.: LINEAR; Added on 22 July 2020 | MPC; JPL |
| – | 2004 BC69 | MCA | 19.6 | 360 m | single | 26 days | 14 Feb 2004 | 18 | alDisc.: Spacewatch | MPC; JPL |
| 0 | 2004 BZ74 | APO | 18.1 | 962 m | multiple | 2004–2020 | 05 Feb 2020 | 165 | Disc.: LINEAR; NEO larger than 1 kilometer | MPC; JPL |
| 8 | 2004 BA75 | APO | 24.4 | 47 m | single | 4 days | 31 Jan 2004 | 14 | Disc.: Spacewatch | MPC; JPL |
| 7 | 2004 BB75 | AMO | 23.1 | 85 m | single | 21 days | 18 Feb 2004 | 41 | Disc.: LINEAR | MPC; JPL |
| 1 | 2004 BS75 | MBA-M | 17.4 | 980 m | multiple | 2004–2020 | 31 Jan 2020 | 66 | Disc.: LINEAR | MPC; JPL |
| 2 | 2004 BN77 | MBA-M | 18.3 | 650 m | multiple | 2004–2019 | 18 Nov 2019 | 44 | Disc.: LINEAR | MPC; JPL |
| 0 | 2004 BF85 | APO | 19.89 | 320 m | multiple | 2004-2026 | 27 Aug 2026 | 91 | Disc.: LINEAR | MPC; JPL |
| 1 | 2004 BV85 | MBA-I | 17.87 | 980 m | multiple | 2004-2025 | 09 Jan 2025 | 29 | Disc.: LINEAR | MPC; JPL |
| 0 | 2004 BE86 | AMO | 21.09 | 200 m | multiple | 2003–2023 | 08 Mar 2023 | 397 | Disc.: LINEAR | MPC; JPL |
| 8 | 2004 BK86 | APO | 25.4 | 30 m | single | 1 day | 31 Jan 2004 | 8 | Disc.: LINEAR | MPC; JPL |
| 0 | 2004 BL100 | MBA-M | 18.55 | 490 m | multiple | 2004-2025 | 23 May 2025 | 33 | Disc.: Spacewatch | MPC; JPL |
| 1 | 2004 BC101 | MBA-O | 17.6 | 1.7 km | multiple | 2004–2020 | 15 Mar 2020 | 40 | Disc.: Spacewatch; Added on 22 July 2020 | MPC; JPL |
| 0 | 2004 BN101 | MBA-I | 19.19 | 430 m | multiple | 2004–2022 | 25 Jan 2022 | 38 | Disc.: Spacewatch | MPC; JPL |
| – | 2004 BT122 | MBA-M | 19.2 | 800 m | single | 9 days | 30 Jan 2004 | 13 | Disc.: Mauna Kea Obs. | MPC; JPL |
| – | 2004 BU122 | HIL | 18.6 | 1.1 km | single | 9 days | 30 Jan 2004 | 13 | Disc.: Mauna Kea Obs. | MPC; JPL |
| 0 | 2004 BJ123 | MBA-I | 19.53 | 370 m | multiple | 2004–2022 | 25 Jan 2022 | 106 | Disc.: Mauna Kea Obs. Added on 17 June 2021; Alt.: 2020 RL111 | MPC; JPL |
| 0 | 2004 BN123 | MBA-M | 18.3 | 920 m | multiple | 2004–2018 | 14 Sep 2018 | 44 | Disc.: Mauna Kea Obs. | MPC; JPL |
| 0 | 2004 BR123 | MBA-M | 18.7 | 540 m | multiple | 2004–2021 | 08 May 2021 | 27 | Disc.: Mauna Kea Obs. Added on 21 August 2021; Alt.: 2017 HG79 | MPC; JPL |
| 2 | 2004 BZ124 | MBA-I | 19.8 | 330 m | multiple | 2004–2015 | 15 Mar 2015 | 28 | Disc.: Spacewatch; Alt.: 2015 BK507 | MPC; JPL |
| 0 | 2004 BD126 | MBA-I | 19.13 | 440 m | multiple | 2004–2021 | 30 Oct 2021 | 64 | Disc.: Spacewatch; Added on 30 September 2021 | MPC; JPL |
| 0 | 2004 BQ127 | MBA-M | 18.08 | 1.3 km | multiple | 2004–2021 | 28 Nov 2021 | 74 | Disc.: Spacewatch; Added on 5 November 2021 | MPC; JPL |
| 1 | 2004 BA131 | MBA-O | 18.3 | 1.2 km | multiple | 2004–2020 | 02 Feb 2020 | 24 | Disc.: Spacewatch; Added on 17 January 2021 | MPC; JPL |
| 1 | 2004 BZ133 | MBA-O | 17.8 | 1.5 km | multiple | 2004–2021 | 17 Feb 2021 | 23 | Disc.: Spacewatch; Added on 17 June 2021 | MPC; JPL |
| 0 | 2004 BQ135 | MBA-O | 17.1 | 2.1 km | multiple | 2004–2020 | 22 Mar 2020 | 43 | Disc.: Spacewatch; Added on 22 July 2020 | MPC; JPL |
| 3 | 2004 BB136 | MBA-O | 17.6 | 1.7 km | multiple | 2004–2020 | 14 Feb 2020 | 43 | Disc.: Spacewatch; Added on 22 July 2020; Alt.: 2015 EJ52 | MPC; JPL |
| 0 | 2004 BX141 | MBA-M | 18.2 | 960 m | multiple | 2004–2021 | 15 Jan 2021 | 42 | Disc.: Spacewatch | MPC; JPL |
| 0 | 2004 BT142 | MBA-O | 17.55 | 1.7 km | multiple | 2004–2021 | 17 Apr 2021 | 39 | Disc.: Spacewatch; Alt.: 2015 EB72 | MPC; JPL |
| 0 | 2004 BN143 | MBA-I | 18.65 | 550 m | multiple | 2004–2021 | 01 Nov 2021 | 48 | Disc.: Spacewatch; Alt.: 2019 AQ56 | MPC; JPL |
| 0 | 2004 BQ153 | MBA-I | 18.93 | 490 m | multiple | 2004–2022 | 27 Jan 2022 | 49 | Disc.: Spacewatch; Alt.: 2015 BK435 | MPC; JPL |
| 4 | 2004 BR156 | MBA-O | 17.9 | 1.5 km | multiple | 2004–2021 | 15 Mar 2021 | 23 | Disc.: Spacewatch; Added on 17 June 2021; Alt.: 2015 BE172 | MPC; JPL |
| 2 | 2004 BG159 | MBA-M | 18.9 | 490 m | multiple | 2004–2021 | 09 May 2021 | 107 | Disc.: Cerro Paranal; Added on 17 June 2021; Alt.: 2021 GC100 | MPC; JPL |
| E | 2004 BK159 | MBA-M | 18.4 | 1.2 km | single | 2 days | 22 Jan 2004 | 6 | Disc.: Paranal Obs. | MPC; JPL |
| 0 | 2004 BN159 | MBA-I | 18.5 | 590 m | multiple | 2004–2020 | 21 Oct 2020 | 41 | Disc.: Paranal Obs. | MPC; JPL |
| – | 2004 BR159 | MBA-O | 17.3 | 1.9 km | single | 3 days | 23 Jan 2004 | 8 | Disc.: Paranal Obs. | MPC; JPL |
| – | 2004 BV159 | MBA-M | 18.5 | 840 m | single | 2 days | 22 Jan 2004 | 9 | Disc.: Paranal Obs. | MPC; JPL |
| 0 | 2004 BB160 | MBA-O | 17.7 | 1.6 km | multiple | 2004–2017 | 21 Sep 2017 | 36 | Disc.: Paranal Obs. Added on 11 May 2021; Alt.: 2006 SL104 | MPC; JPL |
| 0 | 2004 BD160 | MBA-O | 17.36 | 1.9 km | multiple | 2004–2021 | 29 Apr 2021 | 67 | Disc.: Paranal Obs. Alt.: 2010 PZ29, 2015 FK46 | MPC; JPL |
| 0 | 2004 BG160 | MBA-M | 17.8 | 1.5 km | multiple | 2004–2021 | 06 Jan 2021 | 95 | Disc.: Paranal Obs. | MPC; JPL |
| 0 | 2004 BL160 | MBA-O | 17.94 | 1.4 km | multiple | 2004–2021 | 11 Nov 2021 | 64 | Disc.: Paranal Obs. | MPC; JPL |
| 0 | 2004 BR160 | MBA-I | 19.37 | 400 m | multiple | 2004–2022 | 07 Jan 2022 | 32 | Disc.: Paranal Obs. | MPC; JPL |
| 0 | 2004 BO162 | MBA-O | 17.6 | 1.7 km | multiple | 2004–2018 | 30 Dec 2018 | 40 | Disc.: Mauna Kea Obs. Added on 21 August 2021; Alt.: 2007 TY47 | MPC; JPL |
| 0 | 2004 BA164 | MBA-O | 18.25 | 1.2 km | multiple | 2004–2021 | 07 Nov 2021 | 38 | Disc.: Mauna Kea Obs. Added on 9 March 2021; Alt.: 2006 SC383 | MPC; JPL |
| 0 | 2004 BU167 | MBA-I | 18.7 | 540 m | multiple | 2004–2018 | 15 Apr 2018 | 38 | Disc.: Spacewatch | MPC; JPL |
| 1 | 2004 BY167 | MBA-I | 18.7 | 540 m | multiple | 2004–2018 | 16 May 2018 | 31 | Disc.: LPL/Spacewatch II | MPC; JPL |
| 0 | 2004 BK168 | MBA-I | 19.30 | 410 m | multiple | 2004–2022 | 27 Jan 2022 | 38 | Disc.: Spacewatch | MPC; JPL |
| 0 | 2004 BM168 | MBA-M | 18.4 | 620 m | multiple | 2004–2019 | 17 Dec 2019 | 62 | Disc.: Spacewatch | MPC; JPL |
| 0 | 2004 BO168 | MBA-M | 17.9 | 1.1 km | multiple | 2004–2020 | 20 Dec 2020 | 34 | Disc.: Spacewatch | MPC; JPL |
| 0 | 2004 BR168 | MBA-M | 18.1 | 1.0 km | multiple | 2004–2021 | 09 Jan 2021 | 21 | Disc.: Spacewatch | MPC; JPL |
| 0 | 2004 BS168 | MBA-O | 17.70 | 1.6 km | multiple | 2004–2021 | 08 Apr 2021 | 36 | Disc.: Spacewatch | MPC; JPL |
| 0 | 2004 BS170 | MBA-I | 18.19 | 680 m | multiple | 2004–2021 | 09 Jul 2021 | 47 | Disc.: Spacewatch | MPC; JPL |
| 0 | 2004 BT170 | MBA-O | 17.8 | 1.5 km | multiple | 2004–2019 | 26 Feb 2019 | 38 | Disc.: Spacewatch | MPC; JPL |
| 0 | 2004 BU170 | MBA-I | 18.98 | 480 m | multiple | 2004–2021 | 07 Oct 2021 | 59 | Disc.: Spacewatch | MPC; JPL |
| 1 | 2004 BG172 | MBA-M | 18.8 | 520 m | multiple | 2004–2020 | 02 Feb 2020 | 50 | Disc.: Spacewatch | MPC; JPL |
| 0 | 2004 BK172 | MBA-O | 17.1 | 2.1 km | multiple | 2004–2019 | 29 Nov 2019 | 28 | Disc.: Spacewatch | MPC; JPL |
| 0 | 2004 BE173 | MBA-M | 18.3 | 920 m | multiple | 2004–2021 | 17 Jan 2021 | 41 | Disc.: Spacewatch | MPC; JPL |
| 1 | 2004 BH173 | MBA-O | 18.0 | 1.4 km | multiple | 2004–2020 | 16 Mar 2020 | 35 | Disc.: Spacewatch; Added on 22 July 2020 | MPC; JPL |
| 1 | 2004 BL173 | MBA-M | 18.1 | 1.0 km | multiple | 2004–2020 | 20 Oct 2020 | 42 | Disc.: Spacewatch; Added on 17 January 2021 | MPC; JPL |
| 0 | 2004 BS173 | MBA-I | 19.1 | 450 m | multiple | 2004–2021 | 19 Mar 2021 | 34 | Disc.: Spacewatch; Added on 11 May 2021 | MPC; JPL |
| 0 | 2004 BT173 | MBA-I | 19.36 | 400 m | multiple | 2004–2019 | 05 Nov 2019 | 26 | Disc.: Spacewatch; Added on 17 June 2021 | MPC; JPL |
| 0 | 2004 BV173 | MBA-I | 19.0 | 470 m | multiple | 2004–2021 | 10 Feb 2021 | 24 | Disc.: Spacewatch; Added on 5 November 2021 | MPC; JPL |
| 0 | 2004 BW173 | MBA-O | 17.4 | 1.8 km | multiple | 2004–2021 | 10 Apr 2021 | 24 | Disc.: SDSS; Added on 5 November 2021; Alt.: 2010 MT134 | MPC; JPL |
| 0 | 2004 BX173 | MBA-M | 18.37 | 1.2 km | multiple | 2004–2021 | 08 Dec 2021 | 40 | Disc.: Spacewatch; Added on 24 December 2021 | MPC; JPL |

back to top
