= List of unnumbered minor planets: 2004 R (0–199) =

This is a partial list of unnumbered minor planets for principal provisional designations assigned during 1–15 September 2004. Since this period yielded a high number of provisional discoveries, it is further split into several standalone pages. As of April 2026, a total of 132 bodies remain unnumbered for this period. Objects for this year are listed on the following pages: A–B · C · D–E · F · G–H · J–O · P–Q · R_{i} · R_{ii} · R_{iii} · S · T_{i} · T_{ii} · T_{iii} · T_{iv} · U–V · W–X and Y. Also see previous and next year.

Near-Earth obj.	MBA (inner)	MBA (outer)	Centaur
Mars-crosser	MBA (middle)	Jupiter trojan	Trans-Neptunian obj.
Unclassified

== R ==
U	Designation	Class	Physical		Observations				Description and notes	Ref
U	Designation	Class	H	D	Opp.	Arc	Last	Used	Description and notes	Ref
0	2004 RW1	MCA	18.1	710 m	multiple	2004–2018	10 Jul 2018	73	Disc.: LINEAR; Alt.: 2018 MK6	MPC; JPL
0	2004 RM2	MBA-I	18.09	720 m	multiple	2004–2019	30 Nov 2019	82	Disc.: NEAT	MPC; JPL
0	2004 RV2	AMO	20.7	260 m	multiple	2004–2020	22 Mar 2020	121	Disc.: LINEAR	MPC; JPL
5	2004 RW2	APO	24.4	47 m	single	11 days	17 Sep 2004	64	Disc.: LINEAR	MPC; JPL
0	2004 RF4	MBA-M	18.1	1.0 km	multiple	2004–2017	16 Aug 2017	36	Disc.: NEAT	MPC; JPL
1	2004 RK7	MBA-M	18.18	690 m	multiple	2004–2021	01 Dec 2021	53	Disc.: NEAT; Alt.: 2021 RJ26	MPC; JPL
0	2004 RJ9	AMO	19.67	400 m	multiple	2004-2023	07 Jul 2023	68,	Disc.: LINEAR	MPC; JPL
1	2004 RL9	MCA	19.3	410 m	multiple	2004–2016	08 Jan 2016	76	Disc.: LINEAR; Alt.: 2015 VB121	MPC; JPL
0	2004 RM9	MCA	19.3	410 m	multiple	2004–2020	19 Aug 2020	51	Disc.: LINEAR	MPC; JPL
2	2004 RT9	MBA-M	18.17	980 m	multiple	2004-2024	06 Jul 2024	32	Disc.: LINEAR	MPC; JPL
0	2004 RV9	MCA	17.6	1.7 km	multiple	2004–2019	24 Jan 2019	107	Disc.: LINEAR; Alt.: 2010 AP74	MPC; JPL
0	2004 RZ9	MCA	19.34	400 m	multiple	2004–2021	01 Oct 2021	56	Disc.: LINEAR	MPC; JPL
0	2004 RJ10	MCA	17.70	1.2 km	multiple	2004–2021	08 Sep 2021	125	Disc.: LINEAR	MPC; JPL
–	2004 RP10	MBA-O	18.2	1.3 km	single	10 days	17 Sep 2004	25	Disc.: Spacewatch	MPC; JPL
5	2004 RQ10	AMO	20.9	230 m	single	72 days	19 Nov 2004	548	Disc.: LINEAR; Potentially hazardous object	MPC; JPL
0	2004 RY10	APO	21.1	210 m	multiple	2004–2020	17 Apr 2020	114	Disc.: Apache Point; Potentially hazardous object	MPC; JPL
1	2004 RZ10	MCA	19.72	410 m	multiple	2004-2026	29 Oct 2026	88	Disc.: LINEAR	MPC; JPL
5	2004 RB11	AMO	23.7	65 m	single	70 days	17 Nov 2004	62	Disc.: LINEAR	MPC; JPL
8	2004 RC11	APO	23.6	68 m	single	28 days	06 Oct 2004	49	Disc.: LINEAR	MPC; JPL
–	2004 RD11	MBA-M	18.3	650 m	single	5 days	13 Sep 2004	19	Disc.: LINEAR	MPC; JPL
0	2004 RW11	MBA-O	17.43	2.4 km	multiple	2004–2021	11 Apr 2021	147	Disc.: Goodricke-Pigott Obs. Alt.: 2009 WD266	MPC; JPL
0	2004 RP12	MBA-O	16.9	2.3 km	multiple	2004–2017	29 Jan 2017	113	Disc.: LINEAR	MPC; JPL
0	2004 RK14	MBA-M	18.11	1.0 km	multiple	2004–2021	01 Nov 2021	151	Disc.: SSS	MPC; JPL
1	2004 RU14	MBA-I	18.0	750 m	multiple	2004–2019	12 Dec 2019	80	Disc.: SSS	MPC; JPL
0	2004 RE15	MBA-M	17.8	1.2 km	multiple	2004–2017	20 Nov 2017	85	Disc.: SSS; Alt.: 2017 SN1	MPC; JPL
0	2004 RF17	MBA-M	18.33	910 m	multiple	2004–2021	07 Jul 2021	59	Disc.: Spacewatch	MPC; JPL
0	2004 RY18	MBA-I	18.69	540 m	multiple	2004–2019	28 Nov 2019	57	Disc.: Spacewatch	MPC; JPL
0	2004 RN19	MBA-M	18.0	1.4 km	multiple	2002–2013	23 Sep 2013	41	Disc.: Spacewatch; Alt.: 2013 SB11	MPC; JPL
0	2004 RS20	MBA-I	19.04	490 m	multiple	2004-2025	23 Sep 2025	51	Disc.: Spacewatch	MPC; JPL
0	2004 RE23	MBA-M	17.91	780 m	multiple	2004–2021	10 Nov 2021	42	Disc.: Spacewatch	MPC; JPL
2	2004 RZ23	MCA	19.72	550 m	multiple	2004-2026	23 Jun 2026	39	Disc.: LINEAR	MPC; JPL
0	2004 RA24	MCA	17.79	1.2 km	multiple	2004–2019	05 Feb 2019	108	Disc.: LINEAR	MPC; JPL
0	2004 RD24	MCA	17.1	1.6 km	multiple	2004–2017	06 Nov 2017	77	Disc.: SSS	MPC; JPL
1	2004 RH24	MCA	18.4	570 m	multiple	2004-2021	24 Sep 2021	41	Disc.: LINEAR	MPC; JPL
1	2004 RS25	AMO	20.2	320 m	multiple	2004–2010	15 Apr 2010	137	Disc.: Spacewatch	MPC; JPL
0	2004 RY26	MBA-I	18.4	620 m	multiple	2004–2015	25 Apr 2015	35	Disc.: NEAT; Alt.: 2008 RJ96, 2015 HS145	MPC; JPL
3	2004 RQ29	MBA-O	16.9	2.3 km	multiple	2004–2010	26 Apr 2010	20	Disc.: LINEAR; Alt.: 2010 HU127	MPC; JPL
0	2004 RO30	MBA-I	18.3	650 m	multiple	1993–2019	05 Oct 2019	61	Disc.: LINEAR	MPC; JPL
0	2004 RJ38	MBA-O	17.41	1.8 km	multiple	2004–2021	04 Dec 2021	132	Disc.: LINEAR	MPC; JPL
–	2004 RA41	MCA	19.6	360 m	single	4 days	11 Sep 2004	10	Disc.: Spacewatch	MPC; JPL
1	2004 RP43	MBA-I	18.4	620 m	multiple	2004–2019	06 Dec 2019	125	Disc.: LINEAR; Alt.: 2008 VO74	MPC; JPL
0	2004 RG48	MBA-M	18.12	1.2 km	multiple	2004-2019	16 Jan 2019	49	Disc.: LINEAR	MPC; JPL
0	2004 RO53	MBA-I	17.8	820 m	multiple	2004–2020	14 Dec 2020	40	Disc.: LINEAR	MPC; JPL
0	2004 RD62	MBA-I	18.7	540 m	multiple	2004–2014	24 Nov 2014	94	Disc.: LINEAR; Alt.: 2014 UM52	MPC; JPL
0	2004 RJ64	MBA-I	18.47	860 m	multiple	2004-2023	16 Nov 2023	95	Disc.: LINEAR	MPC; JPL
–	2004 RW68	MBA-M	18.3	650 m	single	5 days	13 Sep 2004	18	Disc.: LINEAR	MPC; JPL
0	2004 RA70	MCA	19.39	900 m	multiple	2004-2022	25 Nov 2022	83	Disc.: LINEAR; Added on 21 August 2021; MCA at MPC	MPC; JPL
0	2004 RC71	MBA-I	18.15	520 m	multiple	2004-2022	16 Nov 2022	77	Disc.: LINEAR	MPC; JPL
0	2004 RP77	MCA	18.7	780 m	multiple	2004-2025	26 Nov 2025	77	Disc.: LINEAR	MPC; JPL
7	2004 RC80	AMO	24.4	47 m	single	10 days	18 Sep 2004	54	Disc.: LINEAR	MPC; JPL
2	2004 RX83	MCA	19.8	410 m	multiple	2004-2014	29 Apr 2014	40	Disc.: NEAT	MPC; JPL
1	2004 RE84	APO	21.9	150 m	multiple	2004–2020	27 Apr 2020	205	Disc.: LINEAR; Potentially hazardous object	MPC; JPL
1	2004 RH84	MCA	19.3	410 m	multiple	2004–2017	16 Dec 2017	208	Disc.: LINEAR	MPC; JPL
0	2004 RR86	MBA-O	17.12	2.1 km	multiple	2004–2021	03 Nov 2021	35	Disc.: LINEAR	MPC; JPL
0	2004 RD88	MBA-I	19.25	420 m	multiple	2004–2022	25 Jan 2022	35	Disc.: Spacewatch	MPC; JPL
0	2004 RO91	MBA-M	18.31	920 m	multiple	2004–2021	27 Sep 2021	89	Disc.: LINEAR; Alt.: 2017 RE112	MPC; JPL
0	2004 RV98	MBA-M	17.4	1.4 km	multiple	2004–2019	08 Jan 2019	63	Disc.: LINEAR	MPC; JPL
4	2004 RL103	MCA	19.4	390 m	multiple	2004–2017	25 Oct 2017	34	Disc.: LINEAR	MPC; JPL
0	2004 RZ108	MBA-M	18.47	850 m	multiple	2004–2021	31 Oct 2021	82	Disc.: Spacewatch; Alt.: 2021 PS21	MPC; JPL
0	2004 RO109	HUN	19.44	300 m	multiple	2004-2023	23 Oct 2023	55	Disc.: Spacewatch	MPC; JPL
4	2004 RQ109	AMO	20.6	270 m	single	75 days	23 Nov 2004	43	Disc.: LINEAR	MPC; JPL
0	2004 RR109	MBA-O	17.4	1.8 km	multiple	2004–2016	22 Sep 2016	97	Disc.: Spacewatch; MCA at MPC	MPC; JPL
0	2004 RS109	AMO	19.17	590 m	multiple	2004–2023	26 Jan 2023	320	Disc.: Črni Vrh Obs.	MPC; JPL
6	2004 RU109	APO	26.4	19 m	single	2 days	12 Sep 2004	50	Disc.: LINEAR	MPC; JPL
0	2004 RY109	APO	19.0	560 m	multiple	2004–2020	28 Jan 2020	147	Disc.: LINEAR; Potentially hazardous object	MPC; JPL
2	2004 RD110	MBA-M	17.2	1.1 km	multiple	2004–2021	26 Nov 2021	40	Disc.: LONEOS	MPC; JPL
0	2004 RX110	MBA-M	17.4	2.4 km	multiple	2004–2020	25 Jan 2020	139	Disc.: Goodricke-Pigott Obs.	MPC; JPL
0	2004 RG111	MBA-O	17.64	1.7 km	multiple	2004–2022	07 Jan 2022	72	Disc.: Spacewatch	MPC; JPL
7	2004 RN111	APO	25.0	36 m	single	6 days	17 Sep 2004	46	Disc.: LINEAR; AMO at MPC	MPC; JPL
2	2004 RO111	ATE	23.3	78 m	multiple	2004–2020	10 Sep 2020	69	Disc.: LINEAR	MPC; JPL
0	2004 RP111	MBA-O	18.21	1.3 km	multiple	2004–2022	25 Jan 2022	99	Disc.: LINEAR; MCA at MPC	MPC; JPL
1	2004 RB114	MBA-M	17.7	1.6 km	multiple	2004–2015	22 Jan 2015	22	Disc.: NEAT; Alt.: 2015 BY486	MPC; JPL
1	2004 RQ116	MBA-I	19.85	320 m	multiple	2004–2021	29 Nov 2021	33	Disc.: Spacewatch	MPC; JPL
1	2004 RS116	MBA-O	17.20	2.0 km	multiple	2004–2021	30 Oct 2021	89	Disc.: Spacewatch; Added on 21 August 2021; Alt.: 2010 NN69	MPC; JPL
0	2004 RF117	MBA-I	19.3	410 m	multiple	2004–2019	29 Sep 2019	34	Disc.: Spacewatch	MPC; JPL
0	2004 RV119	MBA-M	17.8	1.2 km	multiple	2004–2019	03 Jan 2019	21	Disc.: Spacewatch; Added on 21 August 2021	MPC; JPL
1	2004 RE120	MBA-M	18.1	710 m	multiple	2004–2020	29 Jun 2020	36	Disc.: Spacewatch; Alt.: 2015 EQ29	MPC; JPL
3	2004 RV120	MBA-O	17.0	2.2 km	multiple	2004–2015	09 Nov 2015	18	Disc.: Spacewatch; Added on 21 August 2021	MPC; JPL
1	2004 RG122	MBA-M	18.5	590 m	multiple	2004–2021	02 Dec 2021	18	Disc.: Spacewatch; Added on 24 December 2021	MPC; JPL
0	2004 RR122	MBA-I	19.0	470 m	multiple	2004–2020	24 Jan 2020	34	Disc.: Spacewatch; Alt.: 2015 RS220	MPC; JPL
2	2004 RB125	MBA-I	19.32	450 m	multiple	2004-2022	17 Nov 2022	27	Disc.: Spacewatch	MPC; JPL
0	2004 RD125	MBA-O	17.08	2.1 km	multiple	2004–2021	07 Nov 2021	75	Disc.: Spacewatch; Alt.: 2021 QJ62	MPC; JPL
1	2004 RP125	MBA-I	19.4	390 m	multiple	2004–2020	10 Dec 2020	26	Disc.: Spacewatch	MPC; JPL
1	2004 RY125	MBA-I	19.5	370 m	multiple	2004–2015	23 Oct 2015	21	Disc.: Spacewatch; Added on 19 October 2020	MPC; JPL
2	2004 RC126	MBA-I	19.5	370 m	multiple	2004–2018	11 Nov 2018	47	Disc.: Spacewatch	MPC; JPL
1	2004 RF126	MBA-M	18.91	690 m	multiple	2004–2021	14 Jul 2021	31	Disc.: Spacewatch	MPC; JPL
1	2004 RZ126	MBA-O	17.7	1.6 km	multiple	2004–2019	27 Oct 2019	32	Disc.: Spacewatch	MPC; JPL
3	2004 RK127	MBA-M	18.66	800 m	multiple	2004-2017	14 Sep 2017	17	Disc.: Spacewatch	MPC; JPL
3	2004 RW127	MBA-M	18.91	690 m	multiple	2004–2021	01 Oct 2021	27	Disc.: Spacewatch; Added on 5 November 2021	MPC; JPL
3	2004 RL128	MBA-M	18.0	750 m	multiple	2004–2016	29 Jul 2016	22	Disc.: Spacewatch	MPC; JPL
3	2004 RH129	HIL	16.4	2.9 km	multiple	2004–2020	05 Nov 2020	36	Disc.: Spacewatch; Alt.: 2020 RZ59	MPC; JPL
1	2004 RD130	MBA-O	17.7	1.6 km	multiple	2004–2021	31 Oct 2021	33	Disc.: Spacewatch; Added on 29 January 2022	MPC; JPL
0	2004 RR130	MBA-O	17.54	1.7 km	multiple	2004–2021	23 Nov 2021	36	Disc.: Spacewatch	MPC; JPL
0	2004 RV130	MBA-I	19.25	420 m	multiple	2004–2021	08 Dec 2021	59	Disc.: Spacewatch	MPC; JPL
1	2004 RD131	MBA-M	18.3	1.2 km	multiple	2004–2018	05 Oct 2018	22	Disc.: Spacewatch	MPC; JPL
1	2004 RP131	MBA-M	18.02	740 m	multiple	2004–2021	29 Nov 2021	23	Disc.: Spacewatch; Added on 24 December 2021	MPC; JPL
0	2004 RX131	MBA-I	18.7	540 m	multiple	2004–2019	15 Nov 2019	78	Disc.: Spacewatch	MPC; JPL
1	2004 RY131	MBA-I	19.2	430 m	multiple	2004–2015	02 Oct 2015	16	Disc.: Spacewatch; Added on 21 August 2021	MPC; JPL
1	2004 RZ131	MBA-I	19.32	450 m	multiple	2004-2025	23 Sep 2025	63	Disc.: Spacewatch	MPC; JPL
0	2004 RK132	MBA-M	17.8	820 m	multiple	2004–2021	28 Nov 2021	26	Disc.: Spacewatch; Added on 24 December 2021	MPC; JPL
0	2004 RZ132	MBA-M	18.25	670 m	multiple	2000–2021	27 Nov 2021	31	Disc.: Spacewatch	MPC; JPL
0	2004 RB133	MBA-O	17.7	1.6 km	multiple	1999–2020	12 Sep 2020	39	Disc.: Spacewatch; Added on 17 January 2021	MPC; JPL
2	2004 RC133	MBA-M	18.53	580 m	multiple	2004–2021	28 Nov 2021	28	Disc.: Spacewatch; Added on 24 December 2021	MPC; JPL
0	2004 RF133	MBA-I	18.77	520 m	multiple	2004–2021	08 Sep 2021	60	Disc.: Spacewatch	MPC; JPL
3	2004 RY133	MBA-M	19.2	410 m	multiple	2004-2021	02 Dec 2021	36	Disc.: Spacewatch	MPC; JPL
0	2004 RY135	MBA-I	18.9	490 m	multiple	2004–2015	08 Nov 2015	24	Disc.: Spacewatch; Alt.: 2015 TM254	MPC; JPL
2	2004 RX140	MBA-M	17.6	1.7 km	multiple	2004–2018	01 Nov 2018	48	Disc.: LINEAR; Alt.: 2018 RC47	MPC; JPL
1	2004 RE146	MBA-M	18.35	640 m	multiple	2000–2021	28 Nov 2021	68	Disc.: LINEAR	MPC; JPL
0	2004 RE149	MBA-I	18.4	620 m	multiple	2004–2019	25 Nov 2019	68	Disc.: LINEAR	MPC; JPL
0	2004 RT149	MBA-M	18.28	930 m	multiple	2004–2021	27 Nov 2021	76	Disc.: LINEAR; Alt.: 2021 PQ71	MPC; JPL
1	2004 RC161	MBA-O	17.8	1.5 km	multiple	1993–2020	23 Aug 2020	38	Disc.: Spacewatch; Alt.: 2020 PA49	MPC; JPL
0	2004 RG161	MBA-M	18.37	890 m	multiple	2004–2021	27 Sep 2021	60	Disc.: Spacewatch	MPC; JPL
0	2004 RX161	MBA-M	17.3	1.5 km	multiple	2004–2017	02 Jul 2017	33	Disc.: LINEAR; Alt.: 2013 SQ3	MPC; JPL
0	2004 RX163	MBA-M	17.7	1.6 km	multiple	2004–2019	01 Jan 2019	116	Disc.: LINEAR; Alt.: 2018 RQ9	MPC; JPL
5	2004 RG164	APO	25.8	25 m	single	25 days	05 Oct 2004	59	Disc.: LINEAR; AMO at MPC	MPC; JPL
4	2004 RU164	AMO	20.7	260 m	single	59 days	08 Nov 2004	22	Disc.: SSS	MPC; JPL
6	2004 RV164	APO	24.3	49 m	single	25 days	08 Oct 2004	85	Disc.: LINEAR; AMO at MPC	MPC; JPL
0	2004 RX164	APO	21.34	220 m	multiple	2004-2024	11 Apr 2024	75	Disc.: LINEAR	MPC; JPL
6	2004 RY164	AMO	20.7	260 m	single	57 days	09 Nov 2004	63	Disc.: NEAT	MPC; JPL
0	2004 RZ164	APO	19.0	560 m	multiple	2004–2013	07 Mar 2013	782	Disc.: SSS; Potentially hazardous object AMO at MPC	MPC; JPL
2	2004 RK165	MCA	19.6	360 m	multiple	2004–2020	19 Oct 2020	105	Disc.: Spacewatch; Alt.: 2020 ME11	MPC; JPL
1	2004 RO165	MBA-M	17.7	860 m	multiple	2004–2018	06 Feb 2018	27	Disc.: LINEAR; Alt.: 2008 QK7	MPC; JPL
4	2004 RX165	AMO	21.1	210 m	single	91 days	13 Dec 2004	49	Disc.: SSS	MPC; JPL
0	2004 RY165	MCA	20.02	210 m	multiple	2004-2023	26 Mar 2023	88	Disc.: Spacewatch	MPC; JPL
1	2004 RE166	MBA-M	17.9	780 m	multiple	2004–2020	08 Aug 2020	38	Disc.: LINEAR	MPC; JPL
0	2004 RY166	MBA-M	17.68	870 m	multiple	2004–2021	01 Dec 2021	40	Disc.: Spacewatch	MPC; JPL
0	2004 RB176	MBA-M	17.94	1.4 km	multiple	2004-2022	24 Dec 2022	61	Disc.: LINEAR	MPC; JPL
0	2004 RV176	MBA-M	17.6	1.7 km	multiple	2004–2018	13 Dec 2018	100	Disc.: LINEAR	MPC; JPL
0	2004 RD177	MBA-M	18.20	680 m	multiple	2004–2022	04 Jan 2022	35	Disc.: LINEAR	MPC; JPL
0	2004 RR181	MCA	19.63	350 m	multiple	2004–2019	02 Nov 2019	53	Disc.: LINEAR; Alt.: 2015 PV57	MPC; JPL
2	2004 RJ188	MBA-I	18.4	620 m	multiple	2004–2018	06 Oct 2018	73	Disc.: LINEAR; Alt.: 2011 TU	MPC; JPL
2	2004 RY199	MBA-I	18.7	540 m	multiple	2004–2020	16 Dec 2020	69	Disc.: Spacewatch	MPC; JPL

back to top
