= 2004 HR56 =

Near-Earth micro-asteroid

2004 HR_{56}
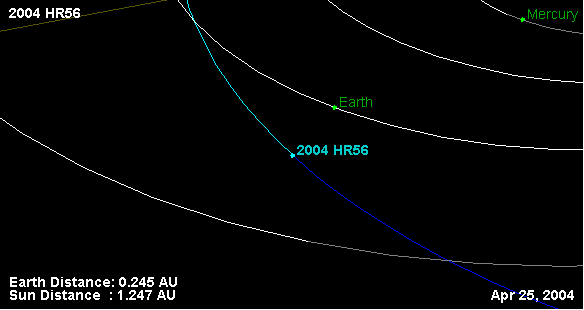
- Orbital diagram of asteroid 2004 HR_{56} as of 25 April 2004

Discovery
- Discovered by: Spacewatch
- Discovery site: Kitt Peak National Obs.
- Discovery date: 25 April 2004

Designations
- Minor planet category: Apollo; NEO

Orbital characteristics
- Epoch 26 April 2004 (JD 2453121.5)
- Uncertainty parameter 9
- Observation arc: (3 days)
- Aphelion: 2.2331 AU
- Perihelion: 0.8772 AU
- Semi-major axis: 1.5552 AU
- Eccentricity: 0.4359
- Orbital period (sidereal): 1.94 yr (708 days)
- Mean anomaly: 41.043°
- Mean motion: 0° 30^{m} 29.52^{s} / day
- Inclination: 5.9726°
- Longitude of ascending node: 41.102°
- Argument of perihelion: 87.895°
- Earth MOID: 0.0601 AU (23.4 LD)

Physical characteristics
- Mean diameter: 74 m
- Absolute magnitude (H): 23.3

2004 HR_{56} is a micro-asteroid, classified as near-Earth object belonging to the Apollo group. It was first observed by Spacewatch at Kitt Peak National Observatory on 25 April 2004.

== Description ==
2004 HR_{56} was visible between 25 April to 10 May 2005. This find was documented as part of the FMO Project and was reported by six different observatories. Reports indicate that the object is about 74 meters wide and has an absolute magnitude of 23.28. The object could also be classified as a meteoroid, although the most common definition uses a diameter of 10 m as the demarcation.

It orbits the Sun at a distance of 0.9–2.2 AU once every 23 months (708 days). Its orbit has an eccentricity of 0.44 and an inclination of 6° with respect to the ecliptic.
